= Habitats Directive =

European Union conservation directive

The Habitats Directive (more formally known as Council Directive 92/43/EEC on the Conservation of natural habitats and of wild fauna and flora) is a directive adopted by the European Community in 1992 as a response to the Berne Convention. The European Community was reformed as the European Union the following year, but the directive is still recognised.

The Habitats Directive required national governments to specify areas that are expected to be ensuring the conservation of flora and fauna species. This led to the setting up of a network of protected areas across the EU, along with 'Special Areas of Conservation', which together with the existing Special Protection Areas, became the so-called Natura 2000 network established to protect species and habitats.

This directive is one of the main pillars of the European Union's system of wildlife and nature conservation, another being the Birds Directive. The Habitats Directive, together with the Birds Directive, are also called the "nature directives".

The Habitats Directive consists of 24 articles of legislation to which all member states must comply. Article 17 of the directive sets the terms and standards for reporting on both the habitats and species listed in the annexes by the individual EU member countries. It stipulates a report from each member country on the state of nature every six years. The first preliminary reports were due in 2001 (but only published in 2004), the first actual assessments were due in 2007 (published 2009), the second in 2013 (published 2015), and the third set of assessment reports were due in 2019 (published 2020). The assessments of conservation status differ markedly from those of the IUCN Red List. The aim in the case of the EU conservation status is to assess the distance from a defined favourable situation, as opposed to the distance from extinction. There are three classes of conservation status: favourable (FV), unfavourable-inadequate (U1) and unfavourable-bad (U2).

The annexes of the directive outline the protected habitats and species:

- Annex I covers habitats,
- Annex II species requiring designation of Special Areas of Conservation,
- Annex IV species in need of strict protection, and
- Annex V species in which member countries may decide for themselves how to manage the population.

== History ==
From 1988 to 1992, the policy was given importance at the national level by policy experts, scientists and ecologists; later on in the 1990s this spawned further political, social and administrative discussions among the relevant countries.

Due to differences in nature conservation traditions, national problems have arisen in the implementation of the directive. Since member states in the south and east of Europe participated less in nature policies, these states experienced problems with the EU provisions. In Germany, Austria, Italy and Belgium, the observation of conflicts between various government layers have caused prolonged delays in the management of nature policies. On the other hand, in member states such as the United Kingdom and Sweden, positive outcomes have developed due to stakeholder involvement, pro-active authorities, agencies responsible for implementation and public participation.

According to one 2014 report there are increasing incompatibilities with the Natura 2000 policy on economic development.

== Annex I ==
Annex I lists the specific habitats which have been designated as the a Special Area of Conservation, to which a common EU-wide legislation applies. Certain habitats among those are furthermore designated as "priority habitat types". Habitats in the EU are given codes. An area or habitat can combine two habitats, and be designated as for example code 35.2 × 64.1 - Open grassland with Corynephorus and Agrostis (35.2), in combination with continental dunes (64.1). Example Annex I habitats are:

Open sea and tidal areas

- Sea cliffs and shingle or stony beaches
- Atlantic and continental salt marshes and salt meadows
- Mediterranean and thermo-Atlantic salt marshes and salt meadows
- Salt and gypsum continental steppes

Dunes

- Sea dunes of the Mediterranean coast
- Continental dunes, old and decalcified

Standing and running freshwater

- Sections of water courses with natural or semi-natural dynamics (minor, average and major beds) where the water quality shows no significant deterioration

Matorral

- Mediterranean arborescent matorral
- Thermo-Mediterranean and pre-steppe brush
- Phrygana

Grasslands

- Natural grasslands
- Semi-natural dry grasslands and scrubland facies
- Sclerophyllous grazed forests (dehesas)
- Semi-natural tall-herb humid meadows
- Mesophile grasslands

Bogs, mires and fens

- Sphagnum acid bogs
- Calcareous fens

Rocky areas and caves

- Scree, chasmophytic vegetation on rocky slopes
- Other rocky habitats

Forests - Only (sub-)natural

- Forests of temperate Europe
- Mediterranean deciduous forests
- Mediterranean sclerophyllous forests
- Alpine and subalpine coniferous forests
- Mediterranean mountainous coniferous forests

The full list of habitats is distributed over 9 main categories.

== Annex II ==
Annex II lists species which determine if an area is a Special Area of Conservation. These include:

=== Animals ===
==== Mammals ====
- Pyrenean desman (Galemys pyrenaicus)
- Bats: Rhinolophus blasii, R. euryale, R. ferrumequinum, R. hipposideros, R. mehelyi, Barbastella barbastellus, Miniopterus schreibersi, Myotis bechsteini, M. blythi, M. capaccinii, M. dasycneme, M. emarginatus, M. myotis
- Rodents: Spermophilus citellus, Castor fiber, Microtus cabrerae
- Carnivores: Lynx (Lynx lynx), otter (Lutra lutra) and Mustela lutreola
- Grey seal and harbour seal
- natural populations of wild goats (Capra aegagrus)
- natural populations of wild sheep (Ovis ammon musimon) on Corsica and Sardinia.
- Rupicapra rupicapra balcanica
- the dolphin Tursiops truncatus and the harbour porpoise Phocoena phocoena

==== Reptiles and amphibians ====
- Land tortoises: Testudo hermanni, T. graeca and T. marginata
- Freshwater turtles: Emys orbicularis, Mauremys caspica and M. leprosa
- Lizards: Lacerta monticola, L. schreiberi, Gallotia galloti insulanagae, Podarcis lilfordi, P. pityusensis, Chalcides occidentalis (a skink) and Phyllodactylus europaeus (a gecko)
- Snakes: Elaphe quatuorlineata, E. situla and Vipera ursinii
- Salamanders: Chioglossa lusitanica, Mertensiella luschani, Salamandrina terdigitata, Triturus cristatus, olm (Proteus anguinus), Speleomantes ambrosii, S. flavus, S. genei, S. imperialis and S. supramontes
- Toads: Bombina bombina and B. variegata
- Frogs: Rana latastei, Discoglossus jeanneae, D. montalentii and D. sardus

==== Fish ====
- All Eudontomyzon species, Lampetra fluviatilis, L. planeri, Lethenteron zanandrai, Petromyzon marinus
- Aphanius iberus and A. fasciatus
- only natural populations of Hucho hucho
- only freshwater populations of salmon (Salmo salar), the trout S. marmoradus and S. macrostigma
- the cyprid fish Alburnus vulturius, A. albidus, Anaecypris hispanica, Aspius aspius, Barbus plebejus, B. meridionalis, B. capito, B. comiza, Chalcalburnus chalcoides, Chondrostoma soetta, Ch. polylepis, Ch. genei, Ch. lusitanicum, Ch. toxostoma, Gobio albipinnatus, G. uranoscopus, Iberocypris palaciosi, Leuciscus lucomonis, L. souffia, all species of Phoxinellus, Rutilus pigus, R. rubilio, R. arcasii, R. macrolepidotus, R. lemmingii, R. friesii meidingeri, R. alburnoides, Rhodeus sericeus amarus, Scardinius graecus
- the Cobitidae loaches Cobitis conspersa, C. larvata, C. trichonica, C. taenia, Misgurnis fossilis, Sabanejewia aurata
- of the perches: Gymnocephalus schraetzer and all Zingel species except Z. asper and Z. zingel
- Gobiidae: Pomatoschistus canestrini, Padogobius panizzai, P. nigricans
- the freshwater sculpins Cottus ferruginosus, C. gobio, C. petiti
- all Alosa species, the river herrings or scads.
- Aristotle's catfish (Silurus aristotelis)

==== Crustaceans ====
- the freshwater crayfish Austropotamobius pallipes

==== Insects ====
- the beetles Buprestis splendens, Cerambyx cerdo, Cucujus cinnaberinus, Dytiscus latissimus, Graphoderus bilineatus, Limoniscus violaceus, Lucanus cervus and Morimus funereus
- the butterflies Coenonympha oedippus, Erebia calcaria, E. christi, Eriogaster catax, Euphydryas aurinia, Graellsia isabellae, Hypodryas maturna, Lycaena dispar, Maculinea nausithous, M. teleius, Melanagria arge, Papilio hospiton, Plebicula golgus
- the praying mantis Apteromantis aptera
- the dragonflies Coenagrion hylas, C. mercuriale, Cordulegaster trinacriae, Gomphus graslinii, Leucorrhina pectoralis, Lindenia tetraphylla, Macromia splendens, Ophiogomphus cecilia, Oxygastra curtisii
- the grasshopper Baetica ustulata

==== Molluscs ====
- Gastropods (snails): Caseolus calculus, C. commixta, C. sphaerula, Discula leacockiana, D. tabellata, Discus defloratus, D. guerinianus, Elona quimperiana, Geomalacus maculosus, Geomitra moniziana, Idiomela subplicata (as Helix subplicata), Leiostyla abbreviata, L. cassida, L. corneocostata, L. gibba, L. lamellosa, Vertigo angustior, V. genesii, V. geyeri, V. moulinsiana
- Bivalves: Margaritifera margaritifera and Unio crassus

=== Plants ===
Mosses and liverworts: Bruchia vogesiaca, Buxbaumia viridis, Dichelyma capillaceum, Dicranum viride, Distichophyllum carinatum, Drepanocladus vernicosus, Jungermannia handelii, Mannia triandra, Meesia longiseta, Nothothylas orbicularis, Orthotrichum rogeri, Petalophyllum ralfsii, Riccia breidleri, Riella helicophylla, Scapania massolongi, Sphagnum pylaisii, Tayloria rudolphiana

Ferns and allies

- the ferns Asplenium jahandiezii, Culcita macrocarpa, Trichomanes speciosum and Woodwardia radicans
- the water ferns Marsilea batardae, M. quadrifolia and M. strigosa
- Botrychium simplex and Ophioglossum polyphyllum
- the squillworts Isoetes boryana and I. malinverniana

Monocots

- Alismataceae: Caldesia parnassifolia and Luronium natans
- Allium grosii
- Eleocharis carniolica
- Juncus valvatus
- Hyacinthoides vicentina
- Leucojum nicaeense
- Daffodils: Narcissus asturiensis, N. calcicola, N. cyclamineus, N. fernandesii, N. humilis, N. pseudonarcissus subsp. nobilis, N. scaberulus, N. triandrus subsp. capax and N. viridiflorus
- Grasses: Avenula hackelii, Bromus grossus, Coleanthus subtilis, Festuca brigantina, F. duriotagana, F. elegans, F. henriquesii, F. sumilusitanica, Gaudinia hispanica, Holcus setiglumis subsp. duriensis, Micropyropsis tuberosa. Pseudarrhenatherum pallens and Puccinellia pungens
- Orchids: Cypripedium calceolus and Liparis loeselii
- Cretan date palm (Phoenix theophrasti)

Dicots

- Apiaceae: Angelica palustris, Apium repens, Athamanta cortiana, Eryngium alpinum, Petagnia saniculifolia, Rouya polygama and Thorella verticillatinundata
- Aldrovanda vesiculosa
- Asteraceae: Centaurea corymbosa, C. gadorensis, C. kartschiana, Centaurea micrantha subsp. herminii, C. pulvinata, C. rothmalerana, C. vicentina, Crepis granatensis, Erigeron frigidus, Hymenostemma pseudanthemis, Leontodon microcephalus, L. boryi, Leuzea longifolia, Ligularia sibirica, Santolina impressa, S. semidentata and Senecio nevadensis
- Boraginaceae: Myosotis lusitanica, M. rehsteineri, M. retusifolia, Omphalodes kuzinskyana and Solenanthus albanicus
- Brassicaceae: Alyssum pyrenaicum, Arabis sadina, Biscutella vincentina, Boleum asperum, Brassica glabrescens, B. insularis, Coincya cintrana, Diplotaxis ibicensis, D. vicentina, Erucastrum palustre, Iberis procumbens subsp. microcarpa, Ionopsidium savianum, Sisymbrium cavanillesianum and S. supinum
- Campanulaceae: Asyneuma giganteum, Jasione crispa subsp. serpentinica and J. lusitanica
- Caryophyllaceae: Arenaria provincialis, Dianthus cintranus subsp. cintranus, D. marizii, D. rupicola, Herniaria algarvica, H. berlengiana, H. maritima, Moehringia tommasinii, Petrocoptis grandiflora, P. montsicciana, P. pseudoviscosa, Silene cintrana, S. hifacensis, S. longicilia and S. mariana
- Centranthus trinervis
- Cistaceae: Cistus palhinhae, Halimium verticillatum, Helianthemum alypoides and H. caput-felis
- Daphne petraea
- Erodium paularense
- Euphorbia transtagana
- Fabaceae: Anthyllis hystrix, Astragalus alopecurus (as Astragalus centralpinus), A. tremolsianus, Genista dorycnifolia, G. holopetala, Melilotus segetalis subsp. fallax and Trifolium saxatile
- Gentianaceae: Gentiana ligustica and Gentianella angelica
- Lamiaceae: Dracocephalum austriacum, Nepeta dirphya, Origanum dictamnus, Sideritis incana subsp. glauca, S. javalambrensis, S. serrata, Teucrium lepicephalum, T. turredanum and Thymus carnosus
- Malvaceae: Kosteletzkya pentacarpos
- Najas flexilis
- Paeoniaceae: Paeonia cambessedesii, P. parnassica and P. clusii subsp. rhodia
- Pinguicula nevadensis
- Plantago algarbiensis and P. almogravensis
- Plumbaginaceae: Armeria berlengensis, A. negleta, A. pseudarmeria, A. soleirolii, A. velutina, Limonium dodartii subsp. lusitanicum, L. lanceolatum and L. multiflorum
- Polygonaceae: Polygonum praelongum and Rumex rupestris
- Primulaceae: Androsace mathildae, A. pyrenaica, Primula palinuri and Soldanella villosa
- Ranunculaceae: Adonis distorta, Aquilegia bertolonii, A. kitaibelii and Pulsatilla patens
- Rosaceae: Potentilla delphinensis
- Saxifragaceae: Saxifraga berica, S. florulenta, S. hirculus and S. tombeanensis
- Scrophulariaceae: Antirrhinum charidemi, Chaenorrhinum serpyllifolium subsp. lusitanicum, Euphrasia marchesettii, Linaria algarviana, L. coutinhoi, L. flava, L. tonzigii, Odontites granatensis, Verbascum litigiosum and Veronica micrantha
- Thesium ebracteatum
- Viola jaubertiana
- Willow: Salix salviifolia subsp. australis
- Zelkova abelicea

=== Priority species ===
There are also a number of priority species:

==== Animals ====
- Dutch tundra vole (Microtus oeconomus arenicola)
- Wolf (Canis lupus): Spanish populations: only those south of the Duero; Greek populations: only those south of the 39th parallel)
- Brown bear
- Iberian lynx
- Monk seal (Monachus monachus)
- Corsican red deer (Cervus elaphus corsicanus)
- Pyrenean ibex (Capra pyrenaica pyrenaica)
- Apennine chamois (Rupicapra ornata)
- Loggerhead sea turtle (Caretta caretta)
- the lizard Gallotia simonyi
- the viper Vipera schweizeri
- Fire salamander (Salamandra salamandra aurorae)
- Majorcan midwife toad (Alytes muletensis)
- the frog Pelobates fuscus insubricus
- the sturgeons Acipenser naccarii and Acipenser sturio
- the fish Valencia hispanica
- some of the anadromous populations in certain sectors of the North Sea of Coregonus oxyrhynchus
- the cyprid fish Ladigesocypris ghigii
- the beetles Carabus olympiae, Osmoderma eremita and Rosalia alpina
- the butterfly Euplagia quadripunctaria (under the synonym Callimorpha quadripunctata)

==== Plants ====
- the fern Dryopteris corleyi
- the moss Bryoerythrophyllum machadoanum
- the liverwort Marsupella profunda
- the spruce Abies nebrodensis
- Androcymbium rechingeri
- Asphodelus bento-rainhae
- Muscari gussonei
- the daffodil Narcissus nevadensis
- Carex panormitana
- Dioscorea chouardii (as Borderea chouardii)
- Grasses: Stipa austroitalica, S. bavarica and S. veneta
- Orchids: Cephalanthera cucullata and Ophrys lunulata
- Apiaceae: Angelica heterocarpa, Apium bermejoi, Bupleurum capillare, B. kakiskalae, Eryngium viviparum, Laserpitium longiradium, Naufraga balearica, Oenanthe conioides and Seseli intricatum
- Asteraceae: Anthemis glaberrima, Artemisia granatensis, Aster pyrenaeus, A. sorrentinii, Carduus myriacanthus, Centaurea alba subsp. heldreichii and subsp. princeps, C. attica subsp. megarensis, C. balearica, C. borjae, C. citricolor, C. horrida, C. kalambakensis, C. lactiflora, C. niederi, C. peucedanifolia, C. pinnata, Crepis crocifolia, Jurinea cyanoides, J. fontqueri, Lamyropsis microcephala, Leontodon siculus and Senecio elodes
- Atropa baetica
- Bassia saxicola
- Boraginaceae: Anchusa crispa, Lithodora nitida, Omphalodes littoralis and Symphytum cycladense
- Brassicaceae: Biscutella neustriaca, Brassica macrocarpa, Coincya rupestris, Coronopus navasii, Diplotaxis siettiana, Iberis arbuscula and Ionopsidium acaule
- Campanula sabatia
- Caryophyllaceae: Arenaria nevadensis, Gypsophila papillosa, Herniaria latifolia subsp. litardierei, Silene hicesiae, S. holzmanii, S. orphanidis, S. rothmaleri and S. velutina
- Convolvulaceae: Convolvulus argyrothamnus and C. fernandesii
- Cistaceae: Tuberaria major
- Daphne rodriguezii
- Euphorbia margalidiana
- Fabaceae: Astragalus algarbiensis, A. aquilanus, A. maritimus, A. verrucosus, Cytisus aeolicus, Ononis hackelii and Vicia bifoliolata
- Gentianaceae: Centaurium rigualii and C. somedanum
- Geraniaceae: Erodium astragaloides and E. rupicola
- Hypericum aciferum
- Lamiaceae: Micromeria taygetea, Nepeta sphaciotica, Thymus camphoratus and T. cephalotos
- Linum muelleri
- Lythrum flexuosum
- Plumbaginaceae: Armeria helodes, A. rouyana, Limonium insulare, L. pseudolaetum and L. strictissimum
- Primulaceae: Primula apennina
- Ranunculaceae: Aconitum corsicum, Aquilegia pyrenaica subsp. cazorlensis, Consolida samia and Ranunculus weyleri
- Reseda decursiva
- Ribes sardum a currant from Saridnia
- Rubiaceae: Galium litorale and G. viridiflorum
- Salicornia veneta
- Scrophulariaceae: Euphrasia genargentea, Globularia stygia, Linaria ficalhoana, L. hellenica, L. ricardoi, L. tursica and Veronica oetaea
- Viola hispida

=== Macaronesia ===
There is a separate list for plants from Macaronesia.

- Isoestes azorica
- Marsilea azorica
- Carex malato-belizii
- Grasses: Deschampsia maderensis, Phalaris maderensis
- Scilla maderensis
- Semele maderensis
- Orchids: Goodyera macrophylla
- Apiaceae: Ammi trifoliatum, Bupleurum handiense, Chaerophyllum azoricum, Ferula latipinna, Melanoselinum decipiens, Monizia edulis, Oenanthe divaricata and Sanicula azorica
- Arceuthobium azoricum
- Asteraceae: Andryala crithmifolia, Argyranthemum thalassophylum. A. winterii, Atractylis preauxiana, Calendula maderensis, Cheirolophus duranii, Ch. ghomerytus, Ch. junonianus, Ch. massonianus, Cirsium latifolium, Helichrysum gossypinum, H. oligocephala, Phagnalon benettii, Stemmacantha cynaroides and Sventenia bupleuroides
- Beta patula
- Caralluma burchardii
- Boraginaceae: Echium candicans, Myosotis azorica and M. maritima
- Brassicaceae: Crambe laevigata and Sinapidendron rupestre
- Campanulaceae: Musschia aurea
- Cistaceae: Cistus chinamadensis
- Crassulaceae: Aeonium gomeraense, A. saundersii, Aichryson dumosum, Monanthes wildpretii and Sedum brissemoretii
- Caryophyllaceae: Spergularia azorica
- Erica azorica
- Euphorbia lambii and E. stygiana
- Fabaceae: Anthyllis lemanniana, Lotus callis-viridis and Vicia dennesiana
- Frangula azorica
- Kunkeliella subsucculenta
- Lamiaceae: Sideritis infernalis, S. marmorea, Teucrium abutiloides and T. betonicum
- Maytenus umbellata
- Oleaceae: Jasminum azoricum and Picconia azorica
- Plantago malato-belizii
- Plumbaginaceae: Limonium dendroides
- Rumex azoricus
- Rosaceae: Bencomia sphaerocarpa, Dendriopterium pulidoi, Marcetella maderensis, Prunus lusitanica subsp. azorica and Sorbus maderensis
- Scabiosa nitens
- Scrophulariaceae: Euphrasia grandiflora, Isoplexis isabelliana, Odontites holliana and Sibthorpia peregrina
- Viola paradoxa

==== Macaronesian priority species ====
- Mosses: Echinodium spinosum and Thamnobryum fernandesii

Androcymbium psammophilum

- Asteraceae: Argyranthemum lidii, Atractylis arbuscula, Lactuca watsoniana, Onopordum nogalesii, O. carduelinum, Pericallis hadrosoma and Tanacetum ptarmiciflorum
- Boraginaceae: Echium gentianoides
- Brassicaceae: Crambe arborea, C. sventenii and Parolinia schizogynoides
- Campanulaceae: Azorina vidalii and Musschia wollastonii
- Ceropegia chrysantha
- Cistaceae: Helianthemum bystropogophyllum
- Convolvulaceae: Convolvulus caput-medusae, C. lopez-socasii and C. massonii
- Euphorbia handiensis
- Fabaceae: Anagyris latifolia, Dorycnium spectabile, Lotus azoricus, Lotus kunkelii, Teline rosmarinifolia and T. salsoloides
- Geranium maderense
- Lamiaceae: Sideritis cystosiphon and S. discolor
- Myrica rivas-martinezii
- Pittosporum coriaceum
- Plumbaginaceae: Limonium arborescens, L. spectabile and L. sventenii
- Rosaceae: Bencomia brachystachya and Chamaemeles coriacea
- Sambucus palmensis
- Solanum lidii
- Scrophulariaceae: Euphrasia azorica, Globularia ascanii, G. sarcophylla and Isoplexis chalcantha

== Annex III ==
This annex explains the criteria which are used to select sites which are eligible to be recognised as important for Europe, or as Special Areas of Conservation. The process consists of two stages. The first stage is to assess the importance at a national level, based on the habitats and species listed in Annex I and II. The second stage is to assess the importance for Europe as a whole, again based on the two earlier annexes.

== Annex IV ==
Annex IV lists species of interest to Europe which are in need of strict protection.

=== Mammals ===
- Insectivores: Pyrenean desman (Galemys pyrenaicus), Erinaceus algirus and Crocidura canariensis
- All species of Microchiroptera
- Rodents: Beaver (Castor fiber), Cricetus cricetus, porcupine (Hystrix cristata), Sicista betulina, suslik (Citellus citellus), Sciurus anomalus, Microtus cabrerae, Dutch tundra vole (Microtus oeconomus arenicola), and all species of Gliridae except Glis glis and Eliomys quercinus
- Carnivores: Grey wolf (except Spanish populations north of the Duero and Greek populations north of the 39th parallel), brown bear (Ursus arctos), otter {Lutra lutra}, Mustela lutreola, wild cat (Felis silvestris), lynx (Lynx lynx), Iberian lynx (Lynx pardinus) and monk seal (Monachus monachus)
- Hoofed animals: Corsican red deer (Cervus elaphus corsicanus), natural populations of wild goats (Capra aegagrus), natural populations of wild sheep (Ovis ammon musimon) on Corsica and Sardinia, Balcan (Rupicapra rupicapra balcanica) and Apennine chamois (R. ornata)
- Cetaceans: All species

=== Reptiles and amphibians ===
Turtles

- Tortoises: Testudo hermanni, T. graeca and T. marginata
- Sea turtles: Caretta caretta, Chelonia mydas, Lepidochelys kempii, Eretmochelys imbricata and Dermochelys coriacea
- Freshwater turtles: Emys orbicularis, Mauremys caspica and M. leprosa

Lizards

- Algyroides fitzingeri, A. marchi, A. moreoticus and A. nigropunctatus
- Chamaeleo chamaeleon
- Gallotia atlantica, G. galloti (including specifically the subspecies insulanagae), G. simonyi and G. stehlini
- Geckoes: Cyrtopodion kotschyi, Phyllodactylus europaeus, Tarentola angustimentalis, T. boettgeri, T. delalandii and T. gomerensis.
- Lacerta agilis, L. bedriagae, L. danfordi, L. dugesi, L. graeca, L. horvathi, L. monticola, L. schreiberi, L. trilineata and L. viridis
- Ophisaurus apodus
- Ophisops elegans
- Podarcis erhardii, P. filfolensis, Podarcis hispanica atrata, P. lilfordi, P. melisellensis, P. milensis, P. muralis, P. peloponnesiaca, P. pityusensis, P. sicula, P. taurica, P. tiliguerta and P. wagleriana
- Skinks: Ablepharus kitaibelli, Chalcides bedriagai, Ch. occidentalis, Ch. ocellatus, Ch. sexlineatus, Ch. viridianus and Ophiomorus punctatissimus
- Stellio stellio

Snakes

- Coluber caspius, C. hippocrepis, C. jugularis, C. laurenti, C. najadum, C. nummifer and C. viridiflavus
- Coronella austriaca
- Eirenis modesta
- Elaphe longissima, E. quatuorlineata and E. situla
- Eryx jaculus
- Natrix natrix cetti, N. natrix corsa and N. tessellata
- Telescopus falax
- Vipera ammodytes, V. schweizeri, V. seoanni (except Spanish populations), V. ursinii and V. xanthina

Salamanders:

- Chioglossa lusitanica
- Euproctus asper, E. montanus and E. platycephalus
- Olm (Proteus anguinus)
- Salamandra atra, S. salamandra aurorae, S. lanzai and S. luschani
- Salamandrina terdigitata
- Speleomantes ambrosii, S. flavus, S. genei, S. imperialis, S. italicus and S. supramontes
- Triturus carnifex, T. cristatus, T. italicus, T. karelinii and T. marmoratus

Toads and frogs:

- Alytes cisternasii, A. muletensis and A. obstetricans
- Bombina bombina and B. variegata
- Bufo calamita and B. viridis
- Discoglossus galganoi, D. jeanneae, D. montalentii, D. pictus and D. sardus
- Treefrogs: Hyla arborea, H. meridionalis and H. sarda
- Pelobates cultripes, P. fuscus and P. syriacus
- Rana arvalis, R. dalmatina, R. graeca, R. iberica, R. latastei and R. lessonae

=== Fish ===
- Perches: Zingel asper
- Sturgeons: Acipenser naccarii and A. sturio
- Coregonus oxyrhynchus (anadromous populations in certain sectors of the North Sea)
- Valencia hispanica

=== Insects ===
- Beetles: Buprestis splendens, Carabus olympiae, Cerambyx cerdo, Cucujus cinnaberinus, Dytiscus latissimus, Graphoderus bilineatus, Osmoderma eremita and Rosalia alpina
- Dragonflies: Aeshna viridis, Cordulegaster trinacriae, Gomphus graslinii, Leucorrhina albifrons, L. caudalis, L. pectoralis, Lindenia tetraphylla, Macromia splendens, Ophiogomphus cecilia, Oxygastra curtisii, Stylurus flavipes and Sympecma braueri
- Grasshoppers: Baetica ustulata and Saga pedo
- Lepidoptera: Apatura metis, Coenonympha hero, C. oedippus, Erebia calcaria, E. christi, E. sudetica, Eriogaster catax, Fabriciana elisa, Hypodryas maturna, Hyles hippophaes, Lopinga achine, Lycaena dispar, Maculinea arion, M. nausithous, M. teleius, M. arge, Papilio alexanor, P. hospiton, Parnassius apollo, P. mnemosyne, Plebicula golgus, Proserpinus proserpina and Zerynthia polyxena
- Mantids: Apteromantis aptera

=== Spiders ===
- Macrothele calpeiana

=== Molluscs ===
- Gastropods (snails): Patella feruginea, Caseolus calculus, C. commixta, C. sphaerula, Discula leacockiana, D. tabellata, D. testudinalis, D. turricula, Discus defloratus, D. guerinianus, Elona quimperiana, Geomalacus maculosus, Geomitra moniziana, Helix subplicata, Leiostyla abbreviata, L. cassida, L. corneocostata, L. gibba and L. lamellosa
- Bivalves: Lithophaga lithophaga, Pinna nobilis, Margaritifera auricularia and Unio crassus

=== Echinoderms ===
- Centrostephanus longispinus

=== Plants ===
Annex IV contains all the plant species listed in Annex II (except the mosses and lichens), plus the plant taxa listed below:

- Ferns: Asplenium hemionitis
- Dracaena draco
- Iridaceae: Crocus etruscus, Iris boissieri and I. marisca
- Liliaceae: Androcymbium europeum, Bellevalia hackelli, Colchicum corsicum, C. cousturieri, Fritillaria conica, F. drenovskii, F. gussichiae, F. obliqua, F. rhodocanakis, Ornithogalum reverchonii, Scilla beirana and S. odorata
- Narcissus longispathus and N. triandrus
- Orchids: Ophrys argolica, Orchis scopulorum and Spiranthes aestivalis
- Apiaceae: Bunium brevifolium
- Aquilegia alpina
- Asteraceae: Argyranthemum pinnatifidum subsp. succulentum, Helichrysum sibthorpii, Picris willkommii, Santolina elegans, Senecio caespitosus, S. lagascanus subsp. lusitanicus and Wagenitzia lancifolia
- Berberis maderensis
- Campanula morettiana and Physoplexis comosa
- Euphorbia nevadensis
- Gesneriads: Ramonda heldreichii (as Jankaea heldreichii) and Ramonda serbica
- Lamiaceae: Rosmarinus tomentosus, Teucrium charidemi, Thymus capitellatus and T. villosus subsp. villosus
- Mandragora officinarum
- Moehringia fontqueri
- Murbeckiella sousae
- Primulaceae: Androsace cylindrica, Primula glaucescens and P. spectabilis
- Saxifraga cintrana, S. portosanctana, S. presolanensis, S. valdensis and S. vayredana
- Scrophulariaceae: Antirrhinum lopesianum and Lindernia procumbens
- Sideroxylon marmulano
- Thymelaea broterana
- Viola athois, V. cazorlensis and V. delphinanth

== Annex V ==
Annex V details the species which are of 'interest' to the European Union, of which the taking or exploitation of wild may be subject to the management decisions of the individual countries concerned. This largely concerns plants or animals in which the hunting or gathering was/is an economic activity. Mammals

- Carnivores: golden jackal (Canis aureus moreoticus), Spanish populations north of the Duera and Greek populations north of the 39th parallel of the grey wolf, Martes martes, Mustela putorius, all species of Phocidae (seals) not mentioned in Annex IV, Genetta genetta and Herpestes ichneumon
- Mountain hare (Lepus timidus)
- Hoofed mammals: Capra ibex, C. pyrenaica (except C. pyrenaica pyrenaica) and Rupicapra rupicapra (except R. rupicapra balcanica and R. ornata)

Amphibians

- Rana esculenta, R. perezi, R. ridibunda and R. temporaria

Fish

- Lampreys: Lampetra fluviatilis and Lethenteron zanandrai
- All sturgeon species not mentioned in Annex IV
- Salmonidae: Thymallus thymallus, Hucho hucho, Salmo salar (only when in fresh water) and all Coregonus spp. (except Coregonus oxyrhynchus - anadromous populations in certain sectors of the North Sea)
- Cyprinids: all Barbus spp.
- Perciformes: Gymnocephalus schraetzer and Zingel zingel
- All Alosa spp.
- Catfish: Silurus aristotelis

Other

- Corals: Corallium rubrum
- Molluscs: Helix pomatia, Margaritifera margaritifera, Microcondylaea compressa and Unio elongatulus
- Hirudo medicinalis
- Crabs: Astacus astacus, Austropotamobius pallipes and A. torrentium
- Lobster: Scyllarides latus
- Moth: Graellsia isabellae

Plants

- Red algae: Lithothamnium coralloides and Phymatholithon calcareum
- Lichens: Cladonia subgenus Cladina
- Mosses: Leucobryum glaucum, all Sphagnum species except Sphagnum pylasii
  Clubmosses: all Lycopodium spp. (see lycopodium powder)
- Galanthus nivalis, Narcissus bulbocodium and N. juncifolius
- Iris lusitanica
- Lilium rubrum
- Ruscus aculeatus
- Asteraceae: Arnica montana, Artemisia eriantha, A. genipi, Doronicum plantagineum subsp. tournefortii and Leuzea rhaponticoides
- Brassicaceae: Alyssum pintadasilvae, Malcolmia lacera subsp. graccilima and Murbeckiella pinnatifida subsp. herminii
- Gentianaceae: Gentiana lutea
- Lamiaceae: Teucrium salviastrum subsp. salviastrum
- Fabaceae: Anthyllis lusitanica, Dorycnium pentaphyllum subsp. transmontana and Ulex densus
- Plumbaginaceae: Armeria sampaio
- Rosaceae: Rubus genevieri subsp. herminii
- Scrophulariaceae: Anarrhinum longipedicelatum, Euphrasia mendonçae, Scrophularia grandiflora subsp. grandiflora, S. berminii and S. sublyrata

== Annex VI ==
This annex compiles the types of capture and killing (i.e. hunting) which are prohibited in the European Community (and now the European Union), as well as prohibited modes of transport (while hunting). These can vary according to form of life. Birds are covered by the older Birds Directive.

- Mammals, for example, may not be hunted using explosives, gassing or smoking out burrows, poisons and poisoned or anaesthetic bait, tape recorders, artificial light sources, mirrors and other dazzling devices, blind or mutilated animals used as live decoys, non-selective nets or traps, crossbows and semi-automatic or automatic machine guns with a magazine capable of holding more than two rounds of ammunition. Other prohibited hunting devices are those to illuminate targets, electrical and/or electronic devices capable of killing or stunning and sighting scopes for night shooting with an electronic image magnifier or image converter.
- Fish may not be caught using poisons or explosives.

It is furthermore illegal to hunt wildlife in the European Union from an aircraft or moving motor vehicle.

== See also ==
- List of European Union directives
- Conservation movement
- Environmental protection
- Environmentalism
- Lagoon
