= Lindenia =

Lindenia is the scientific name of two genera of organisms and may refer to:

- Lindenia (plant), a genus of plants in the family Rubiaceae
- Lindenia (dragonfly), a genus of insects in the family Gomphidae
