= Coincya cintrana =

Conservation status
- Near Threatened (IUCN 3.1)

Scientific classification
- Kingdom: Plantae
- Clade: Tracheophytes
- Clade: Angiosperms
- Clade: Eudicots
- Clade: Rosids
- Order: Brassicales
- Family: Brassicaceae
- Genus: Coincya
- Species: C. cintrana

Binomial name
- Coincya cintrana (Cout.) P.Silva

Species of flowering plant

Coincya cintrana is a flowering plant of the family Brassicaceae. It is a hemicryptophyte plant, and it grows on walls, in steep areas and in rocky slopes. It flowers from April until June.

The species authority is (Cout.) P.Silva, and was published in Bol. Soc. Brot. sér. 2, 60: 153. 1987.

It is protected by Portuguese and European Union legislations, namely by the annex II and IV of the Habitats Directive.

== Distribution ==
It's an endemic species from continental Portugal, namely from Serra de Sintra, Serra de Santo António and Serra de Montejunto.

== Synonyms ==
The Plant List lists this species as a synonym of Coincya monensis subsp. cheiranthos (Vill.) C.Aedo Pérez, Leadlay & Muñoz Garm. In the Tropicos database, the accepted name is also the subspecies mentioned earlier.

EUNIS states that this species is a synonym of Rhynchosinapsis pseudoerucastrum subsp. cintrana.

== Bibliography ==
- Checklist da Flora de Portugal (Continental, Açores e Madeira) - Sociedade Lusitana de Fitossociologia
- Checklist da Flora do Arquipélago da Madeira (Madeira, Porto Santo, Desertas e Selvagens) - Grupo de Botânica da Madeira
