= B. splendens =

B. splendens may refer to:

- Beryx splendens, the splendid alfonsino, a fish species found around the world at depths of between 25 and 1,300 m
- Betta splendens, the Siamese fighting fish, betta or simply fighter, a popular freshwater aquarium fish species
- Brochis splendens, the emerald catfish, emerald brochis, emerald cory, green catfish, or shortbody catfish, a tropical freshwater fish species
- Buprestis splendens, a beetle species found from Western Europe to Russia
