= Caseolus sphaerulus =

Scientific classification
- Kingdom: Animalia
- Phylum: Mollusca
- Class: Gastropoda
- Order: Stylommatophora
- Family: Geomitridae
- Genus: Caseolus
- Species: C. sphaerulus

Binomial name
- Caseolus sphaerulus R.T. Lowe, 1852

Species of gastropod

Caseolus sphaerulus is a species of small land snail, a terrestrial pulmonate gastropod mollusk.

The specific epithet is spelled sphaerulus in both of the references here cited, however the species is also often referred to as C. sphaerula, for example in the Convention of Berne and the Habitats Directive. The species was named as Helix (Caseolus) sphaerula. In Latin,"sphaerula" is a noun meaning "little sphere", so it does not change ending.

== Distribution and conservation status ==
This species of land snail lives in Madeira on dry, stony ground.

It is mentioned in annexes II and IV of the Habitats Directive. This species is threatened by forest replanting, mixed forms of pollution, erosion and the impact of improved access to its habitat. Its future prospects are bad and the species is likely to become extinct in its biogeographical region.
