= August Rätzer =

Swiss entomologist

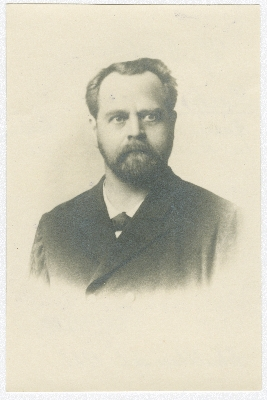
August Ratzer Swiss entomologist

August Rätzer or Raetzer (1845–1907) was a Swiss entomologist who specialised in Lepidoptera. He was a Parson in Solothurn. He wrote Rätzer, 1890 Lepidopterologische Nachlese Mitt. Schweiz. ent. Ges. 8 : 220–229 in which he first described Erebia christi.
