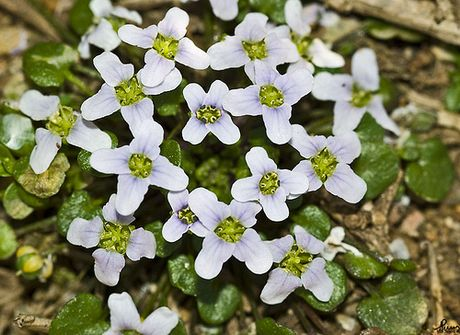
- Ionopsidium acaule

Scientific classification
- Kingdom: Plantae
- Clade: Tracheophytes
- Clade: Angiosperms
- Clade: Eudicots
- Clade: Rosids
- Order: Brassicales
- Family: Brassicaceae
- Genus: Ionopsidium; Rchb. (1829)

Species
- See text

Synonyms
- Minaea Lojac. (1881); Pastoraea Tod. (1858)

= Ionopsidium =

Genus of flowering plants

Ionopsidium is a genus of plants in the family Brassicaceae. It includes 9 species native to the western and central Mediterranean region, from Portugal and Spain to Morocco, Algeria, Tunisia, Italy, Sicily, and Greece.

== Species ==
Nine species are accepted.

- Ionopsidium abulense (Pau) Rothm.
- Ionopsidium acaule (Desf.) DC. ex Rchb.
- Ionopsidium albiflorum Durieu
- Ionopsidium aragonense (H.J.Coste & Soulié) M.Koch
- Ionopsidium glastifolium (L.) M.Koch
- Ionopsidium heterospermum Batt.
- Ionopsidium megalospermum (Maire) M.Koch
- Ionopsidium prolongoi (Boiss.) Batt.
- Ionopsidium savianum (Caruel) Ball ex Arcang.
