= Sedum brissemoretii =

Conservation status
- Vulnerable (IUCN 3.1)

Scientific classification
- Kingdom: Plantae
- Clade: Tracheophytes
- Clade: Angiosperms
- Clade: Eudicots
- Order: Saxifragales
- Family: Crassulaceae
- Genus: Sedum
- Species: S. brissemoretii

Binomial name
- Sedum brissemoretii Raym.-Hamet

Species of flowering plant

Sedum brissemoretii is a flowering plant of the genus Sedum in the family Crassulaceae endemic to Madeira. The species is protected under Annex II of the Habitats Directive.

== Distribution and habitat ==
Sedum brissemoretii grows in coastal sea cliffs of Madeira.
