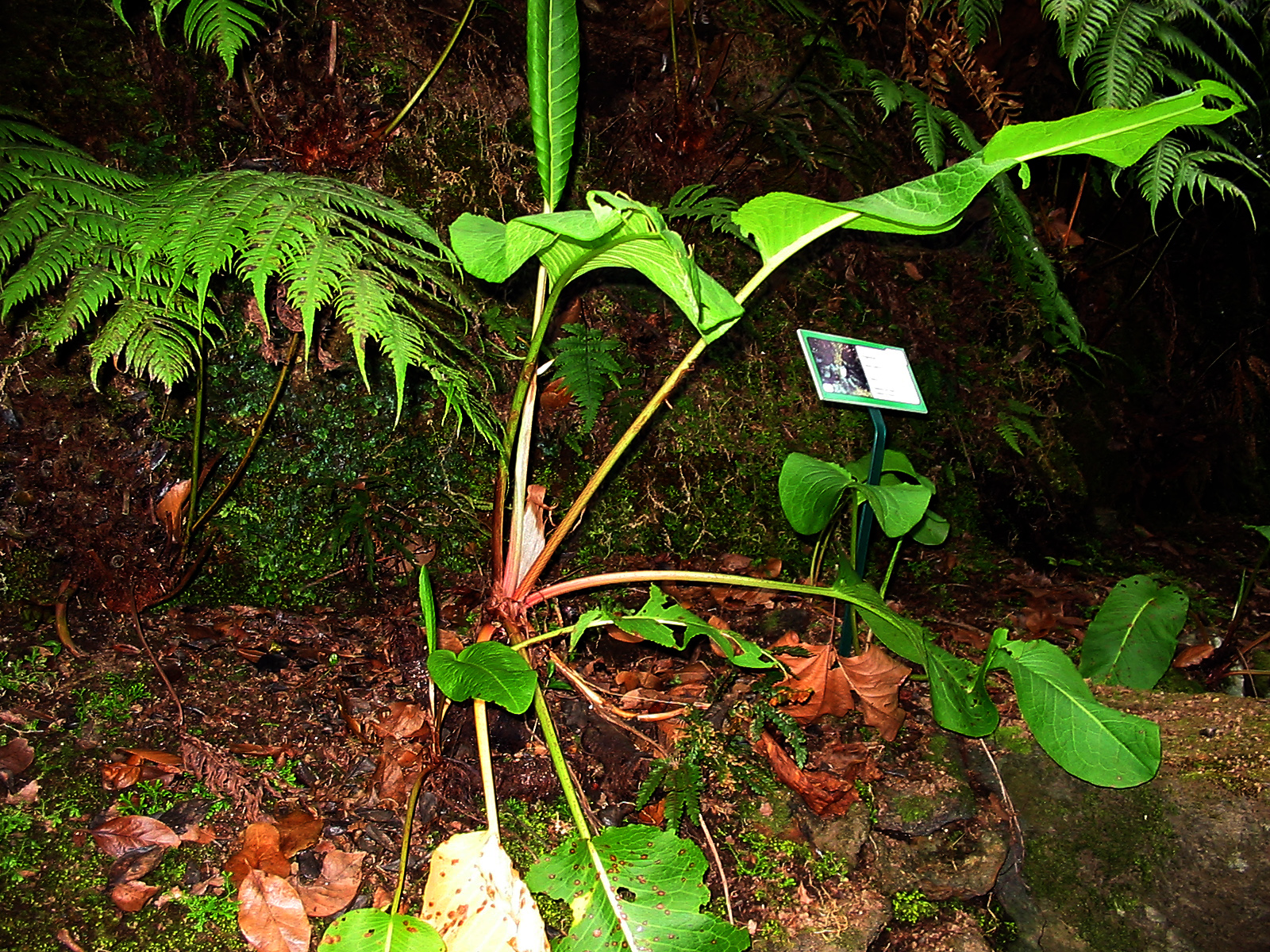

Scientific classification
- Kingdom: Plantae
- Clade: Tracheophytes
- Clade: Angiosperms
- Clade: Eudicots
- Order: Caryophyllales
- Family: Polygonaceae
- Genus: Rumex
- Species: R. azoricus

Binomial name
- Rumex azoricus Rech. fil.

= Rumex azoricus =

Species of plant

Rumex azoricus is a species of sorrel in the family Polygonaceae. It is endemic to the Azores, Portugal.

== Distribution and habitat ==
Rumex azoricus has been observed in five of the nine Azorean islands, specifically in São Miguel, Terceira, São Jorge, Faial and Corvo. It lives in caldeiras, watercourses and natural meadows. In São Jorge it also appears in clearings of coastal forests of Erica azorica and Myrica faya.

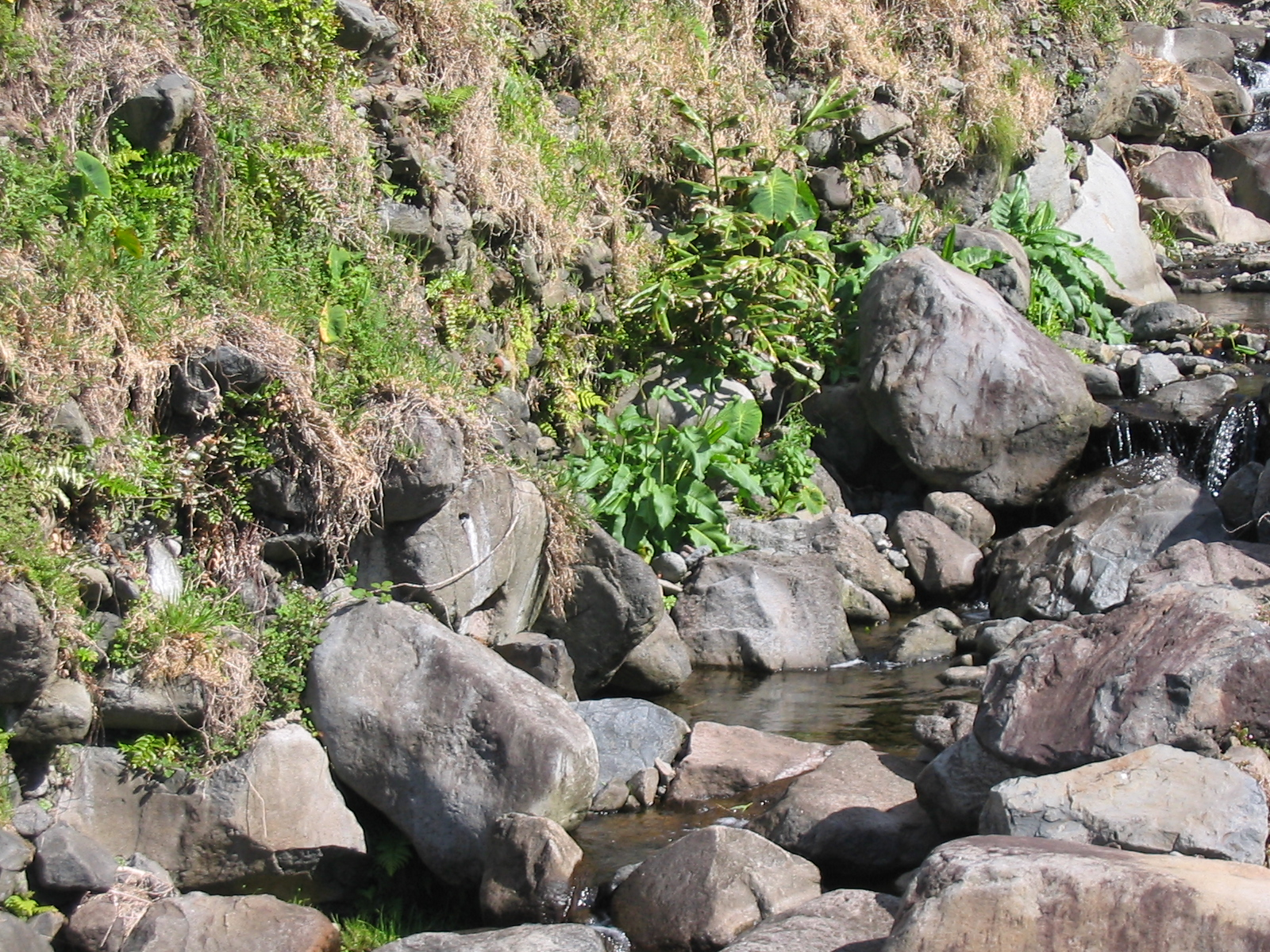
Typical habitat next to a watercourse

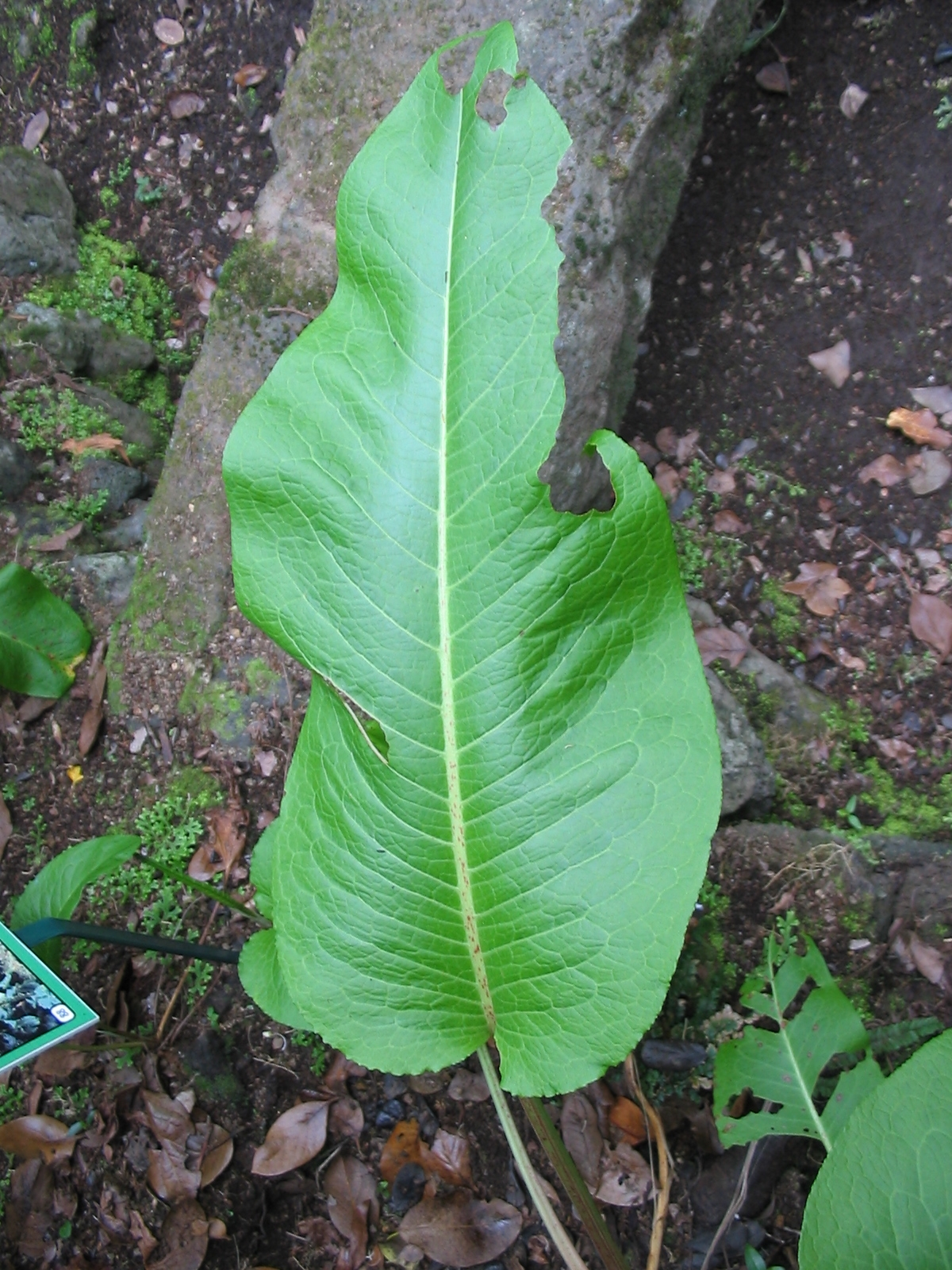
Leaf
