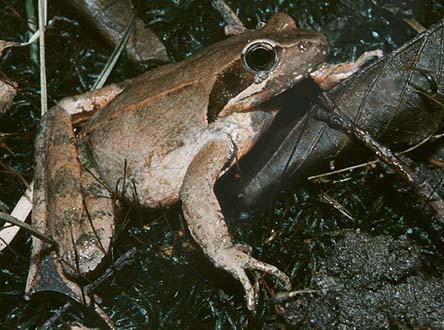

Conservation status
- Vulnerable (IUCN 3.1)

Scientific classification
- Kingdom: Animalia
- Phylum: Chordata
- Class: Amphibia
- Order: Anura
- Family: Ranidae
- Genus: Rana
- Species: R. latastei

Binomial name
- Rana latastei Boulenger, 1879

= Italian agile frog =

Species of amphibian

The Italian agile frog (Rana latastei), also known as Lataste's frog, is a species of frog in the family Ranidae (true frogs). The species is native to southern Europe, primarily found in the Po River Basin of Italy. It is one of the most endangered amphibian species in Europe, with its populations declining sharply in recent years, and has been the focus of multiple conservation plans.

== Etymology ==
The specific name, latastei, is in honor of French herpetologist Fernand Lataste.

== Description ==
Rana latastei may attain a head-body length of 7.5 cm (3.0 in). Females tend to be slightly larger than males. Most frogs have pointed snouts, though rounded snouts have been observed in some individuals. Like many European common frogs, R. latastei is primarily gray or brownish-red with white bellies, with almost no color variation by geographic location. The throat is dark, with a light narrow central stripe that reaches down to the chest. Some sexually active males have dark red or brown spots on their throats, orange-red coloration on the underside of their thighs, and thumb pads on their forelimbs.

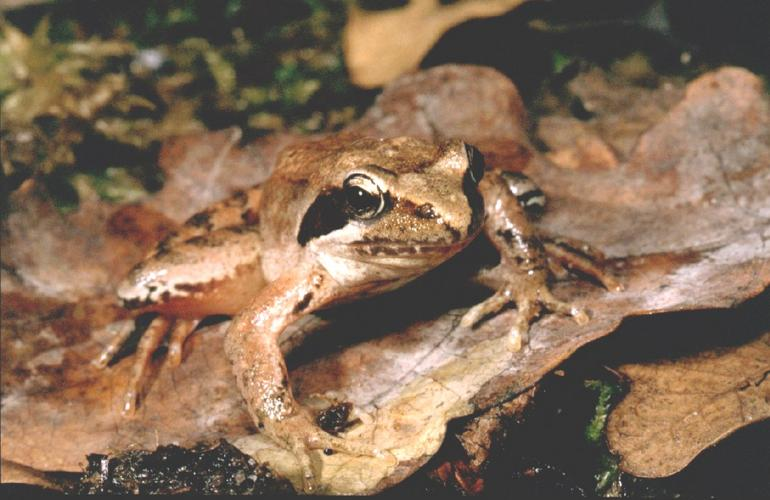
The Italian agile frog is a small brown frog with little morphological variation between different territories.

== Habitat and distribution ==
=== Habitat ===
R. latastei is a decidedly lowland species and rarely occurs above 400 m a. s. l., only going up to the lower foothills of mountains, where the colder climate delays larval development and metamorphosis. The Italian agile frog inhabits oak and hornbeam-dominated plain woods, hygrophilous woods and riparian woods characterized by white poplar and white willow trees. This types of woods may regularly be inundated by floods. It has also been reported from open habitats like wet meadows or peat bogs, as well as cottonwood plantations or ditches in agricultural areas that have sufficient vegetation.

There have also been records of R. latastei living in caves in Italy and Croatia, though they may move between the caves and forests. Researchers have suggested the frogs were either washed into the cave by floods – which are fairly common in most habitats preferred by the Italian agile frog – or they intentionally moved to the caves to avoid predators, find food, or seek humidity. It is unknown whether the Italian agile frog breeds in these subterranean habitats.

The Italian agile frog prefers humid regions with lots of rotting plant material and remains close to rivers, streams, lakes, and other sources of freshwater, which are required for the species' breeding and reproduction. They are most active early in the morning and at dusk and tend to avoid dry weather, during which the frogs will stay closer to sources of water and reduce activity until the evening. Adults are found closer to bodies of water during the breeding season between February and April, and are more commonly found in the forests when it becomes more humid during late spring and summer. Activity tends to be highest in the summer and early autumn once the spring breeding season has concluded. Hibernation on land begins in October, and frogs will emerge in the spring to breed.

=== Geographic distribution ===
Rana latastei is endemic to the plains of northern Italy, the extreme southern tip of Switzerland, the Istrian region of Slovenia, and adjacent Croatia. In Italy, populations are reported from four regions: Lombardy, Venetia, Piedmont and Friuli-Venezia Giulia, but the species is most abundant in the former two. Its distribution mainly follows the Po River plains and tributaries.

== Conservation ==
The IUCN lists this species as Vulnerable (VU). A 2006 report indicated there were only about 250 populations of R. latastei in the wild, with western populations being smaller and at higher risk of extinction. The remaining 250 populations were small, isolated, and suffer from loss of genetic diversity. Major threats to the survival of the species include habitat destruction, degradation, and fragmentation, as it is highly adapted to the floodplain woods of the Po River basin.

=== Habitat loss ===
Water pumping for crop irrigation has been especially harmful because it makes habitats less suitable for breeding. The Italian agile frog does not engage in long-distance movement and rarely strays far from the nearest breeding site, so fragmentation of forest habitats has also led to reduced genetic diversity among this species. This has been predicted to make the species more vulnerable to infection by Ranaviruses and other pathogens. Genetic isolation is also thought to cause significant variation in size between different populations of R. latastei. The introduction of invasive predatory species – including Percottuss glenii, the American bullfrog, and crayfish – have further endangered the Italian agile frog.

The increased deposition of microplastics into the environment has also become a recent concern for the survival of the Italian agile frog. Tadpoles feed in an indiscriminate manner, which puts them at greater risk of ingesting these small plastic particles. Increased microplastic exposure has been associated with reduced growth, activity, and survival rates in R. latastei tadpoles. Smaller microplastic fragments have been associated with the strongest negative effects on the species. This may be because small pieces and fibers of plastic can form blockages and tangled clumps in the tadpoles' intestines. Some researchers have suggested that larger, more developed tadpoles are more resistant to the negative effects of microplastics on growth and activity. It is currently unknown how microplastics affect R. latastei adults.

=== Conservation efforts ===
To enhance the protection of this species, several conservation areas were proposed in Italy, and frog tadpoles bred and translocated to suitable sites. The Regione Lombardia began a conservation effort for the species between 1999 and 2001, which entailed restoration of damaged and heavily polluted ponds as well as the repatriation of tadpoles to pre-existing and manmade ponds. However, these repatriation efforts were only somewhat successful because many tadpoles were placed in ponds lacking the vegetation preferred by the Italian agile frog. Human disturbances such as agriculture, water pollution, and tourism, as well as new predators in repatriated habitats like red crayfish, are additional factors that have negatively affected conservation efforts for R. latastei.

A 2006 action plan by the Standing Committee of the Bern Convention called for protection and improved management of R. latastei habitats, as well as the eradication of invasive predators. Other conservation efforts include habitat restoration, mapping of potential future habitats in Europe, expanded research, distribution surveys, and evaluation of existing legal protections for the Italian agile frog.

== Diet ==
Adult frogs search the forest litter, burrows, and riverbanks for their food, which includes insects like beetles, bugs, and earwigs, as well as worms, snails, centipedes, and several arachnids. The tadpoles feed on algae and other edible and inedible particles.

== Reproduction and life cycle ==
=== Fertilization ===
Reproduction activities occur in small permanent or temporal water bodies with extensive aquatic vegetation or submerged plant material, such as ponds, ditches or floodplain puddles. The Italian agile frog uses breeding sites different from other frogs in their geographic range, which tend to prefer areas with more sunlight and less forest cover. Females lay eggs in a single, compact clump within 50 cm of the water surface, typically within 2 to 15 days of mating. Only one clutch of eggs is deposited per breeding season, typically away from areas prone to frequent flooding. There are usually between 676 and 2720 eggs in a single clutch, with an average of about 1278 eggs per clump. The Italian agile frog's eggs have thinner gelatinous layers – only 6 to 7 mm (about 0.24 in) – than those of other species of frogs. The minimum water temperature for egg deposition is reported as 2 °C, and eggs hatch after 10 to 15 days. The number of clutches laid per year varies substantially due to fluctuations in temperature, humidity, and other environmental factors.

As with other European frogs of the genus, metamorphosis is completed after 2 to 3 months. Froglets are between 13 and 15 mm (about 0.55 in) in length and leave the water in late June or July. Females leave the breeding site immediately after spawning, whereas males and juveniles remain there for up to 5 weeks. Both males and females are able to reproduce in the first breeding season after completing metamorphosis, but do not reach complete sexual maturity until the second year after metamorphosis. Males have a lifespan of about 3 years, while females live 4 years, making the Italian agile frog one of the shortest-lived European common frogs. While other species of common frog tend to live longer at higher altitudes and latitudes, it is currently unknown whether this holds true for the Italian agile frog. This short lifespan and explosive breeding pattern mean that sizes of Italian agile frog populations vary greatly from year to year.

== Mating ==
Between late February and mid-April, males and females gather at breeding sites, although some males have been reported to spend winters inside ponds in order to occupy an ideal breeding site before their counterparts arrive. Males arrive at the breeding sites first and attract females with a species-specific call, which they repeat every 20 to 60 seconds underwater until a female arrives. This call can be one of two distinct sounds: the first is a short, high-pitched "mew" that lasts about half a second, and the second is a harsh, guttural "brum" that lasts about one second. The "mew" call is used for long-distance communication (which can be heard up to 4 m away from the frog), while the lower-frequency "brum" is for short-distance communication (no more than 30 cm away). Some research indicates males call not just to attract females, but also to communicate their dominance over other males within the social hierarchy. Specifically, the "mew" may primarily be used by males to attract potential mates, while the "brum" may be used for courting females or threatening rival males. It is unknown whether males of this species display other territorial behaviors towards one another, despite the high levels of competition for mates. In larger populations, it is more common for a small number of males to mate with many females. Polygyny is less frequently observed in smaller populations, suggesting there are more opportunities for male competition and breeding site monopolization in larger populations.

== Enemies ==
=== Predators ===
The Italian agile frog's primary predators include snakes, herons, pheasants, ducks, and egrets. Tadpoles are preyed upon by waterfowl as well as fish and some invertebrates, such as crayfish. Tadpoles will either freeze in place to avoid detection by predators or "zig-zag" back and forth to prevent predators from accurately predicting their next location. They have also been shown to reduce activity level upon sensing the odor of dragonfly larvae, one of their most common predators. This ability to flexibly modify behavior in response to the presence of dragonflies distinguishes the Italian agile frog from other Rana species.

Tadpoles will modify their behavior less strongly in response to alien predators like crayfish. It is controversial as to whether the presence of predators influences hatching time. However, alien predator crayfish have been shown to induce faster embryonic development: embryos exposed to alien predators will reach Stage 25 of the Gosner development earlier than those which are left in environments without invasive predator species. Tadpoles also tend to metamorphosize earlier in response to invasive predators, which helps meet the energetic requirements for escaping and evading predators. However, this faster development may result in some drawbacks as well: froglets which develop faster tend to have smaller tibiofibular bones than their slower-developing counterparts, likely due to the earlier time of metamorphosis. Smaller tibiofibulas – and, as a result, smaller hindlegs – impair jumping performance, so the frogs which take the longest to fully develop end up with the longest hindlegs and best jumping performance. This decreased jumping performance may make adult frogs less able to escape predators while reducing their ability to catch food.

=== Competitors ===
R. latastei often shares habitats with the closely related Rana dalmatina, but does not often compete with it for resources or shelter due to having more specialized habitats and breeding behaviors. However, the Italian agile frog does experience some reduced reproductive success in environments with large numbers of R. dalmatina. This is likely because R. latastei females which mate with R. dalmatina males fail to produce viable offspring. R. latastei tadpoles will also flexibly increase their behavior if they detect the presence of competitors – namely, R. dalmatina tadpoles, which do not modify their behavior in the presence of their R. latastei counterparts to the same degree.
