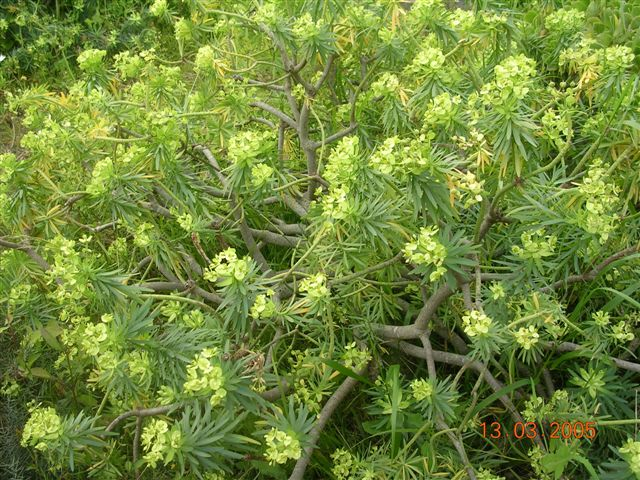

Conservation status
- Vulnerable (IUCN 3.1)

Scientific classification
- Kingdom: Plantae
- Clade: Embryophytes
- Clade: Tracheophytes
- Clade: Spermatophytes
- Clade: Angiosperms
- Clade: Eudicots
- Clade: Rosids
- Order: Malpighiales
- Family: Euphorbiaceae
- Genus: Euphorbia
- Species: E. bourgaeana

Binomial name
- Euphorbia bourgaeana J.Gay ex Boiss.

Synonyms
- Euphorbia lambiorum Svent. (1960)

= Euphorbia bourgaeana =

Species of flowering plant

Euphorbia bourgaeana is a species of flowering plant in the spurge family Euphorbiaceae. It is native to Tenerife in the Canary Islands.

== Description ==
It can grow to a height of 6–10 feet (1.82-3.04 metres), but if potted, it can be kept relatively small. The plant grows well in USDA zones 9b-11.

Like many euphorbias, parts of the plants are poisonous if ingested.
