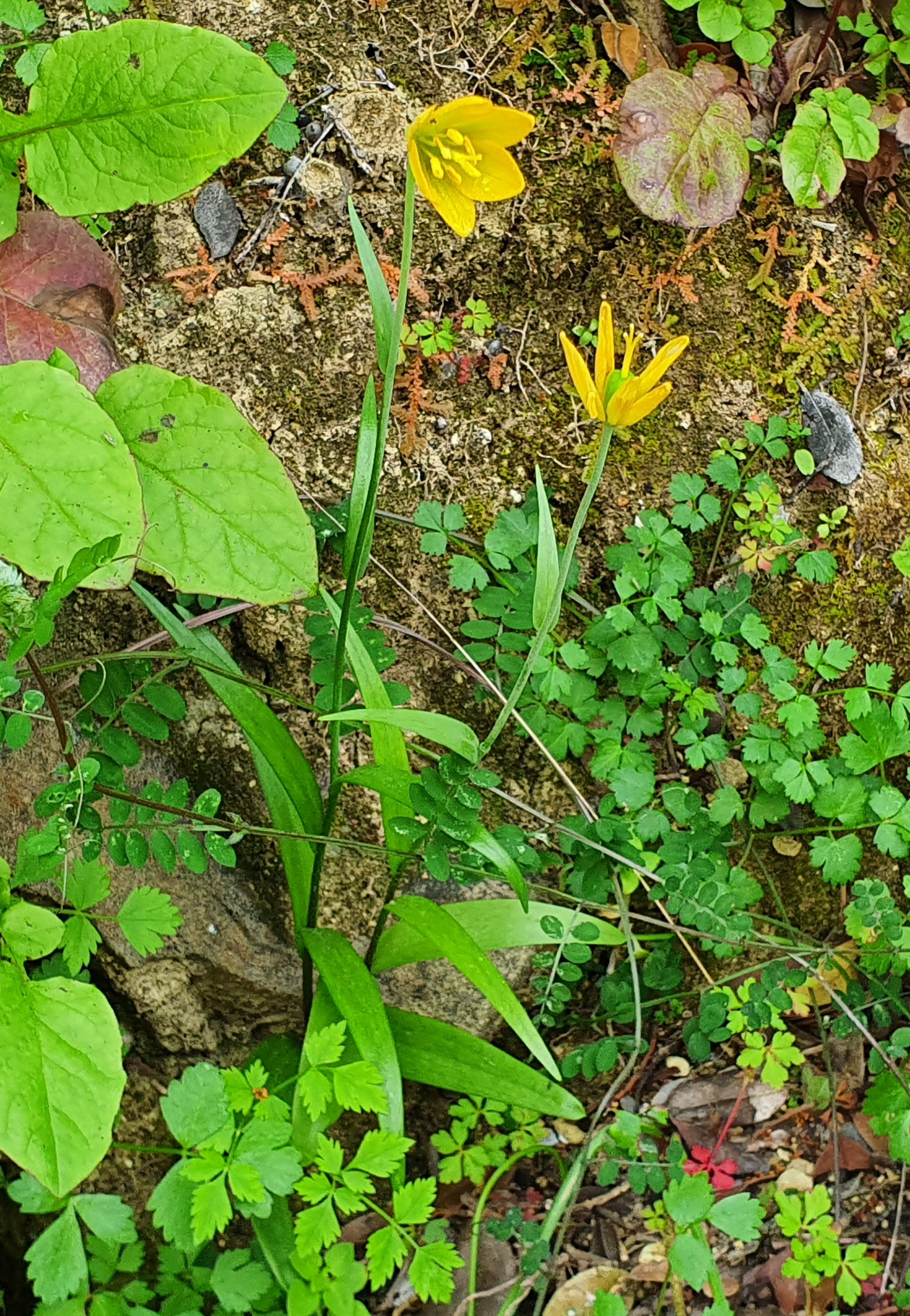
- Fritillaria conica in situ

Conservation status
- Endangered (IUCN 3.1)

Scientific classification
- Kingdom: Plantae
- Clade: Tracheophytes
- Clade: Angiosperms
- Clade: Monocots
- Order: Liliales
- Family: Liliaceae
- Subfamily: Lilioideae
- Genus: Fritillaria
- Species: F. conica

Binomial name
- Fritillaria conica Boiss.
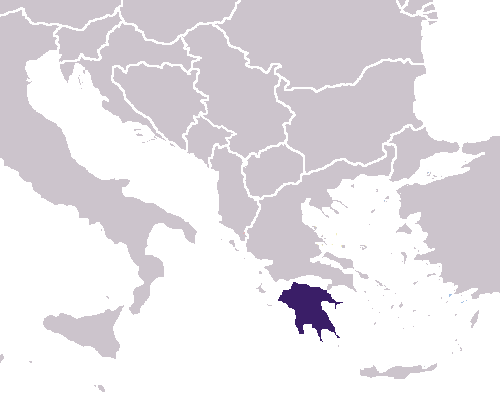
- Distribution of Fritillaria conica

Synonyms
- Fritillaria tulipifolia Bory & Chaub.

= Fritillaria conica =

Species of flowering plant in the lily family

Fritillaria conica is a species of flowering plant of the Liliaceae family native to South West Greece. More specifically, it is endemic to the Peloponnese.

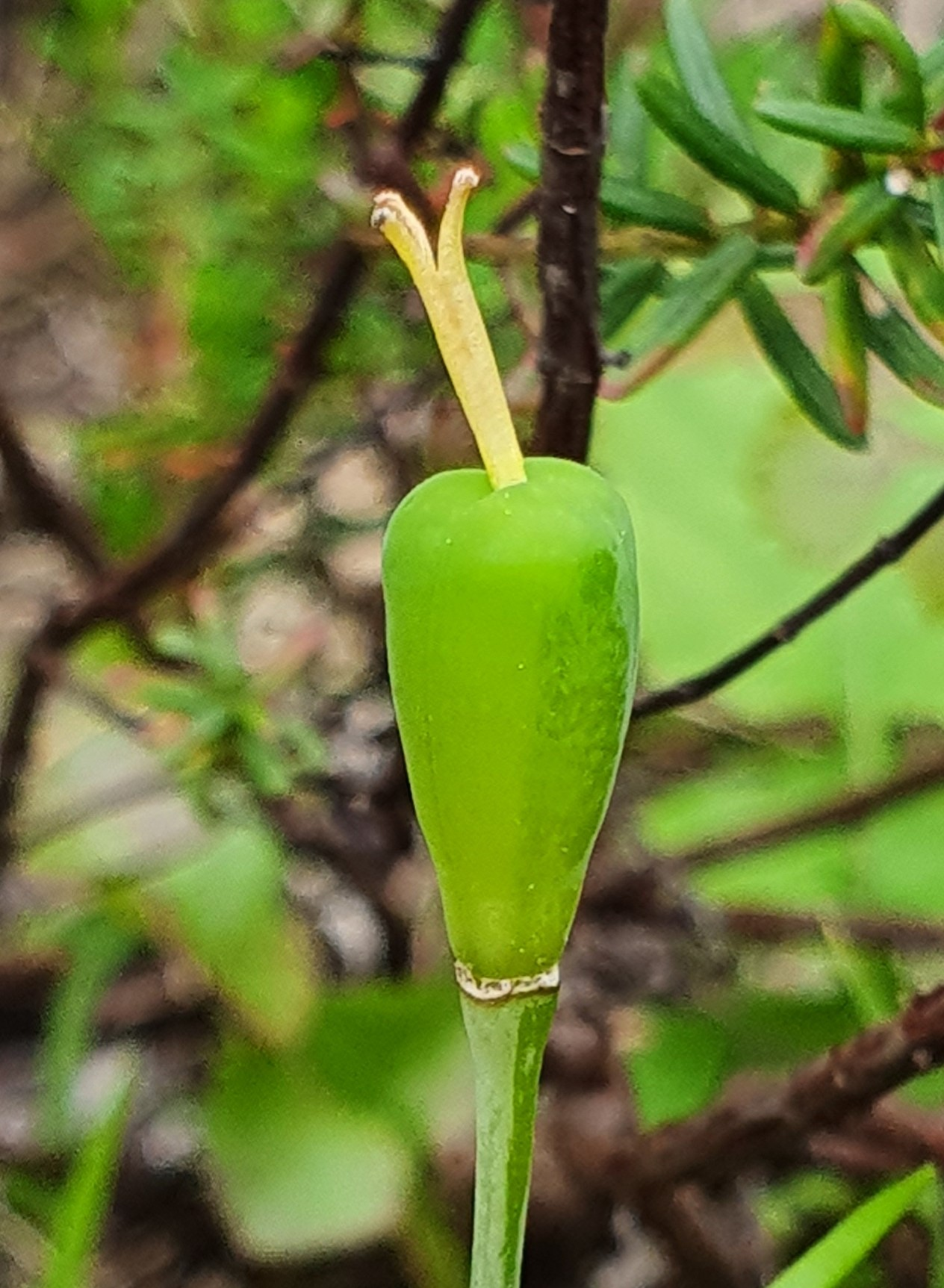
Developing capsule fruit of Fritillaria conica

== Description ==
Fritillaria conica is a 7–35 cm (2.8–13.8 in) tall herb with a glabrous stem, bearing bright green, shiny, 5–8 leaves, which are not glaucous. The leaves are lanceolate to oblong-lanceolate. Basal leaves are opposite or subopposite and the upper leaves are alternate. The 1–2 terminal, conical-campanulate, flowers have a clear yellow colouration, devoid of any patterns. The flowers are nodding. After pollination, unwinged, cylindrical to subglobose capsules are formed. They contain widely winged seeds, which are in fact one of the widest among greek species of Fritillaria.
The diploid chromosome count is 2n = 24.

== Ecology ==
This species is found on rocky, limestone slopes at elevations of 350 m (1,150 ft) above sea level along with Quercus coccifera, Pistacia lentiscus and Phlomis fruticosa. Flowering occurs in March to April.

== Etymology ==
The specific epithet conica is derived from the conical shape of the flowers.

== Conservation ==
This endangered species has small populations, which are distributed over an estimated range of 400 km². The actual area it occupies is estimated to be only 12–16 km^{2} (4.6–6.2 sq mi). There are only 1175 mature individuals remaining. A number, which is further declining. However, the populations are not severely fragmented and they are found at four different locations. It is threatened by agriculture and aquaculture, livestock farming and ranching. Overgrazing poses a challenge, as seed set is limited due to the destruction of flowering stalks. This species also has a low ability to reproduce vegetatively. Efforts of ex-situ conservation have been made and it is protected both under national and international legislation.
