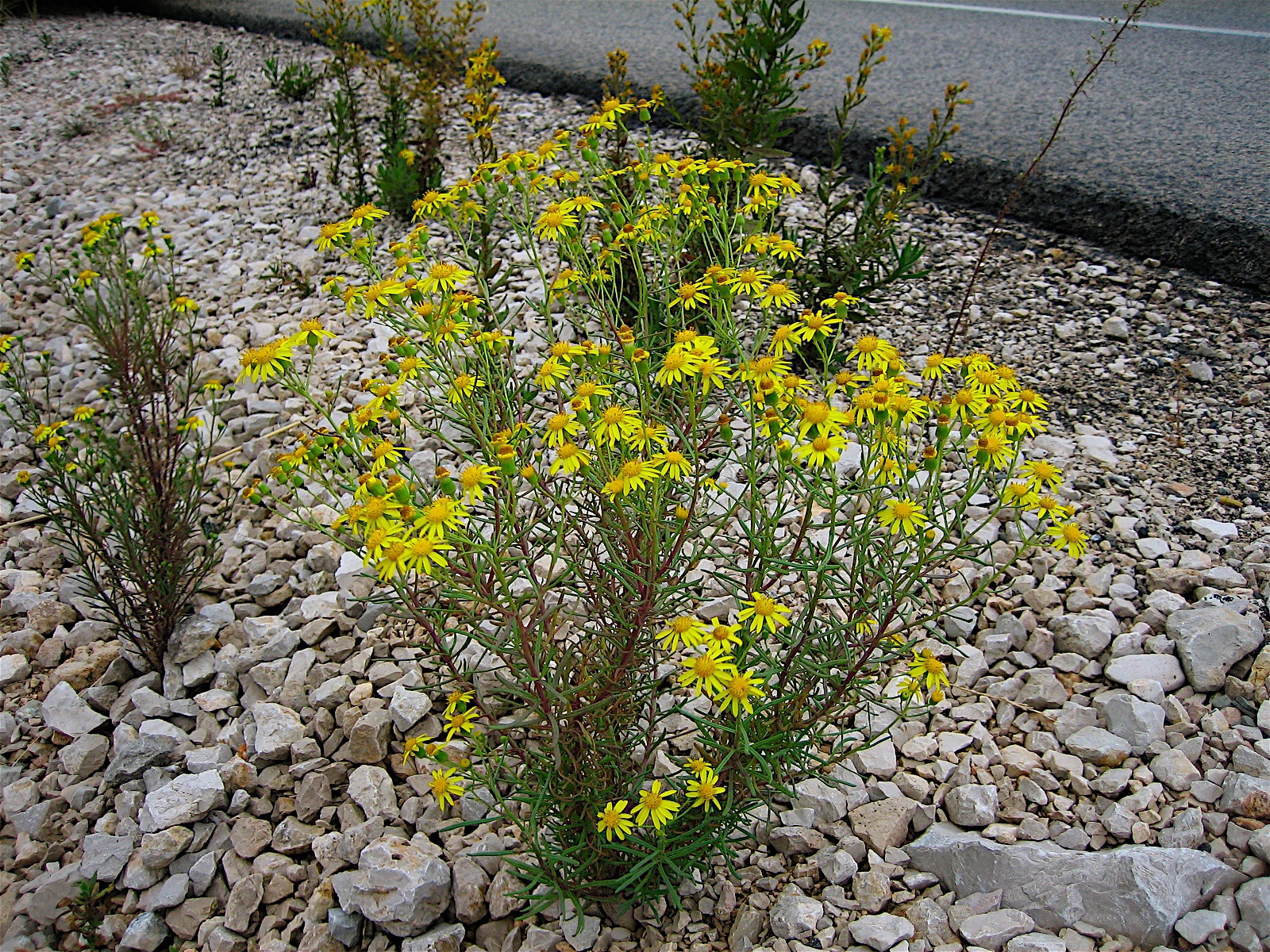

Scientific classification
- Kingdom: Plantae
- Clade: Tracheophytes
- Clade: Angiosperms
- Clade: Eudicots
- Clade: Asterids
- Order: Asterales
- Family: Asteraceae
- Genus: Senecio
- Species: S. nevadensis

Binomial name
- Senecio nevadensis Boiss. & Reut. (1852)

Synonyms
- Senecio linifolius Linn; Sources: IPNI, AFPD

= Senecio nevadensis =

Species of plant in the daisy family

Senecio nevadensis is a species of flowering plant in the family Asteraceae.
