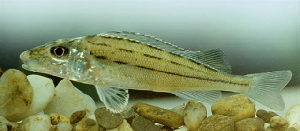

Conservation status
- Least Concern (IUCN 3.1)

Scientific classification
- Kingdom: Animalia
- Phylum: Chordata
- Class: Actinopterygii
- Division: Teleostei
- Order: Perciformes
- Family: Percidae
- Genus: Gymnocephalus
- Species: G. schraetser

Binomial name
- Gymnocephalus schraetser (Linnaeus, 1758)

Synonyms
- List: Perca schraetser Linnaeus, 1758; Acerina schraetser (Linnaeus, 1758); Schraitser ratisbonensium J. C. Schaeffer, 1761; Perca danubiensis Gronow, 1854

= Schraetzer =

Species of fish

The schraetzer (Gymnocephalus schraetser), or striped ruffe, is a species of freshwater ray-finned fish belonging to the family Percidae, the perches and related fishes. This species is found in the catchment of the Danube River in Europe.

== Taxonomy ==
The schraetzer was first formally described as Perca schraetser by Carl Linnaeus in the 10th edition of Systema Naturae published in 1758, with "southern Europe" given as the type locality. This taxon is now considered to be a valid species within the genus Gymnocephalus, the ruffes, within the subfamily Percinae in the family Percidae.

== Etymology ==
The schraetzer is classified within the genus Gymnocephalus, a name that means "naked head", an allusion to the scaleless head of these fishes. The specific name, schraetser, is derived from vernacular names for this fish in Bavaria.

== Distribution and habitat ==
The schraetzer is endemic to the catchment of the Danube River, being found in large and medium sized rivers from the headwaters in Germany downstream to the Danube delta. It is found in stretches of rivers with a moderate current and mud or sand river beds.

== Biology ==
The schraetzer is a largely nocturnal predator, feeding mainly on molluscs. It is crepuscular, and will feed in daylight too. The spawning season runs from April to June, and sexual maturity is atained after at 2 to 3 years of age. This species can reach a length of 30 centimetres (12 in) TL, though most only grow to 15 centimetres (5.9 in). The greatest recorded weight for this species is 250 grams (8.8 oz).

== Utilisation ==
The schraetzer is of no interest to commercial fisheries. It is popular as a game fish, and is also frequently used as bait in pursuit of other species.
