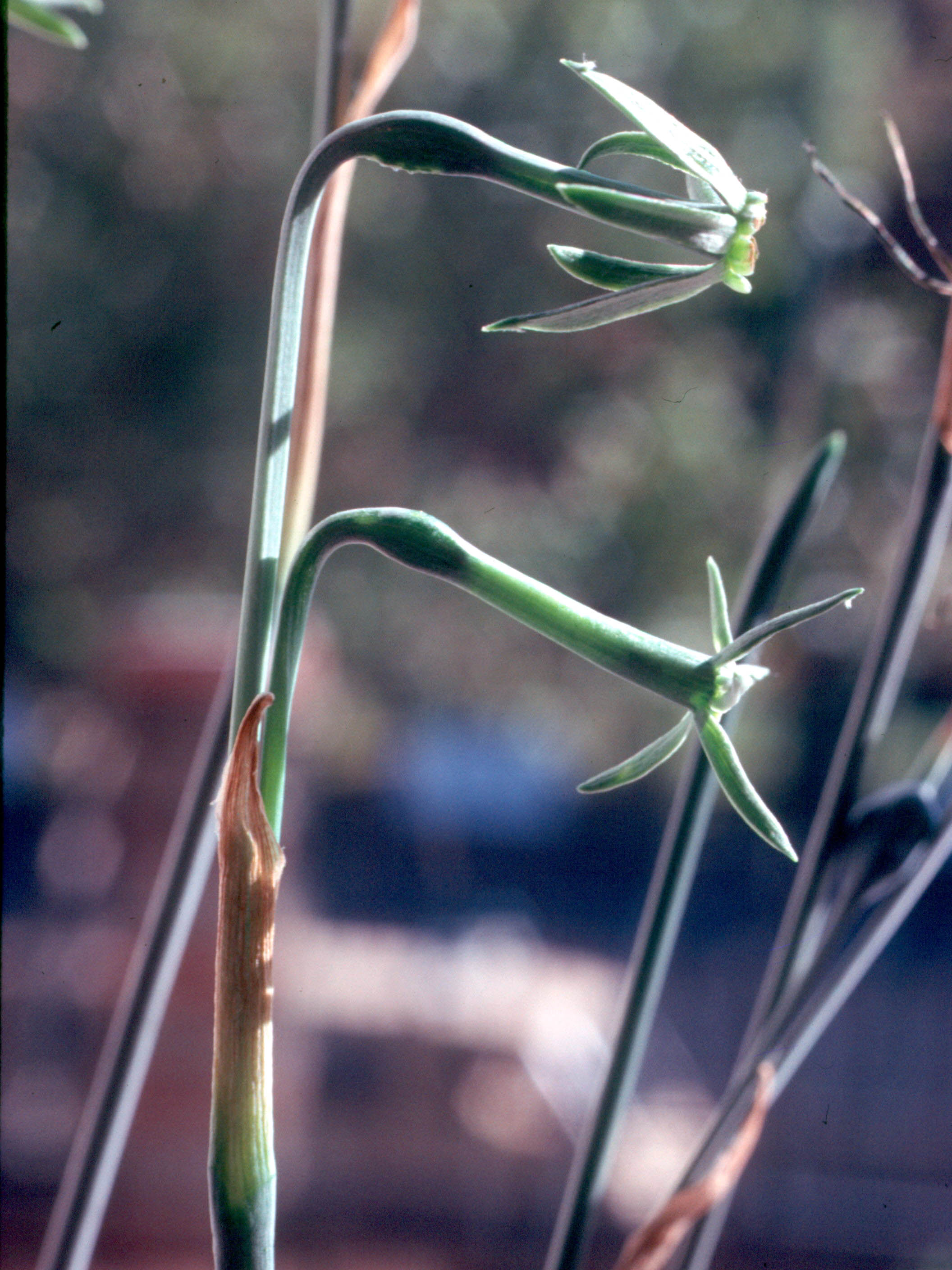

Conservation status
- Near Threatened (IUCN 3.1)

Scientific classification
- Kingdom: Plantae
- Clade: Tracheophytes
- Clade: Angiosperms
- Clade: Monocots
- Order: Asparagales
- Family: Amaryllidaceae
- Subfamily: Amaryllidoideae
- Genus: Narcissus
- Species: N. viridiflorus

Binomial name
- Narcissus viridiflorus Schousb.

Synonyms
- Jonquilla viridiflora (Schousb.) Raf; Chloraster viridiflorus (Schousb.) M. Roem.; Hermione viridiflora (Schousb.) Haw.; Prasiteles viridiflorus (Schousb.) Salisb.

= Narcissus viridiflorus =

Species of daffodil

Narcissus viridiflorus, commonly known as campanitas, is a species of the genus Narcissus (daffodils) in the family Amaryllidaceae. It is classified in Section Jonquillae.

== Description ==
Narcissus viridiflorus possesses a number of unusual features for the genus Narcissus. It is the only species with green flowers, it flowers at night and is one of only five Narcissus species that bloom in the Autumn, rather than Spring.

== Taxonomy ==
Danish botanist Peter Schousboe described the species in 1800 from material collected in Morocco. The species name is derived from the Latin words viridis "green" and flos/floris "flower".

== Distribution ==
Narcissus viridiflorus is native to the southern Iberian Peninsula (southern Spain) and North Africa (northern Morocco). It is known from fewer than 15 populations, with a total area of 84 square kilometres, and is threatened by overgrazing and urban development. It has not been well-studied in north Africa and there may be more populations there.
