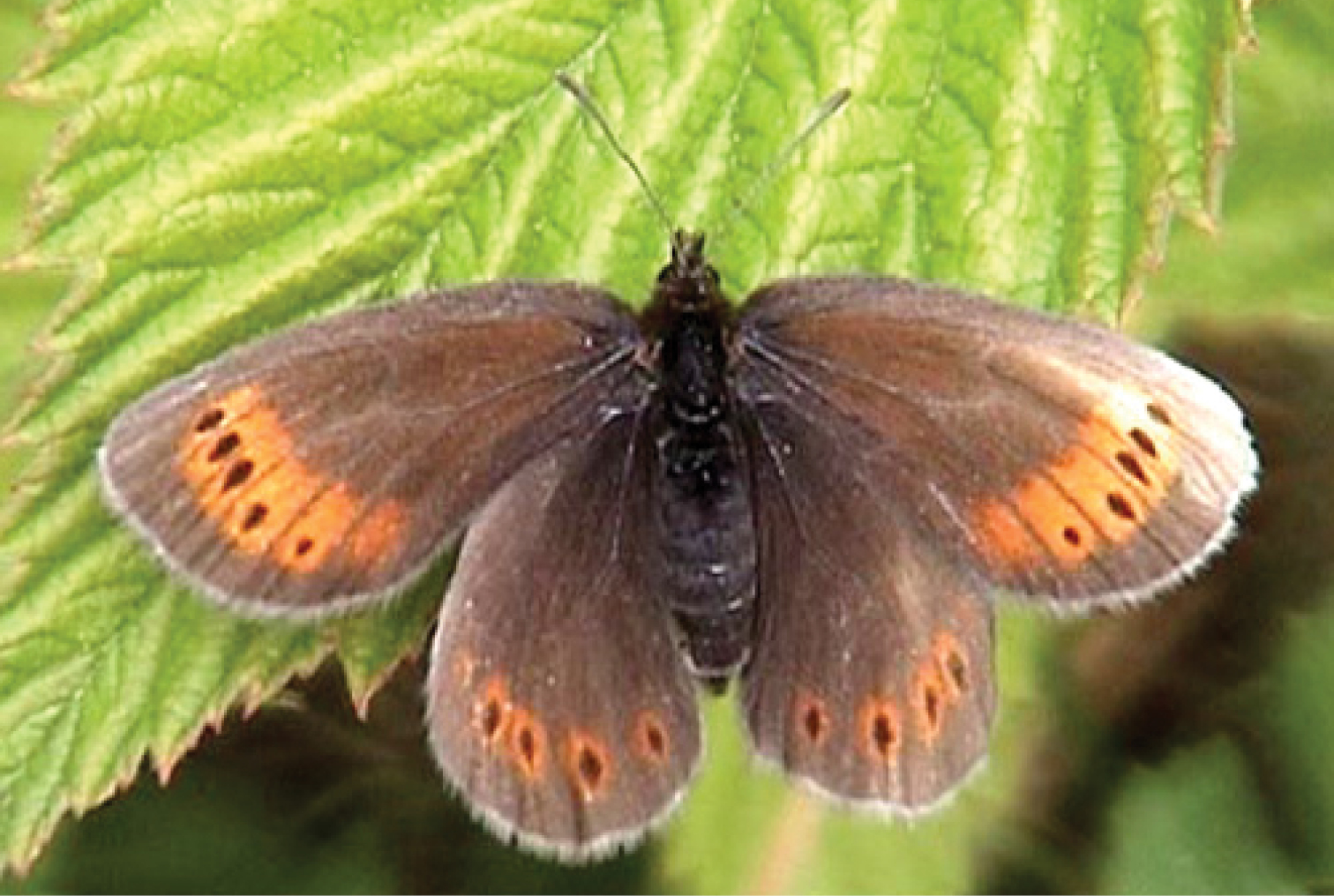

Conservation status
- Near Threatened (IUCN 3.1)

Scientific classification
- Kingdom: Animalia
- Phylum: Arthropoda
- Class: Insecta
- Order: Lepidoptera
- Family: Nymphalidae
- Genus: Erebia
- Species: E. christi

Binomial name
- Erebia christi Rätzer, 1890

= Raetzer's ringlet =

Species of butterfly

The Raetzer's ringlet (Erebia christi) is a species of butterfly in the family Nymphalidae. It is found in Italy and Switzerland. Its natural habitat is temperate grassland. It is one of the rarest European butterflies, having not more than six or seven populations.

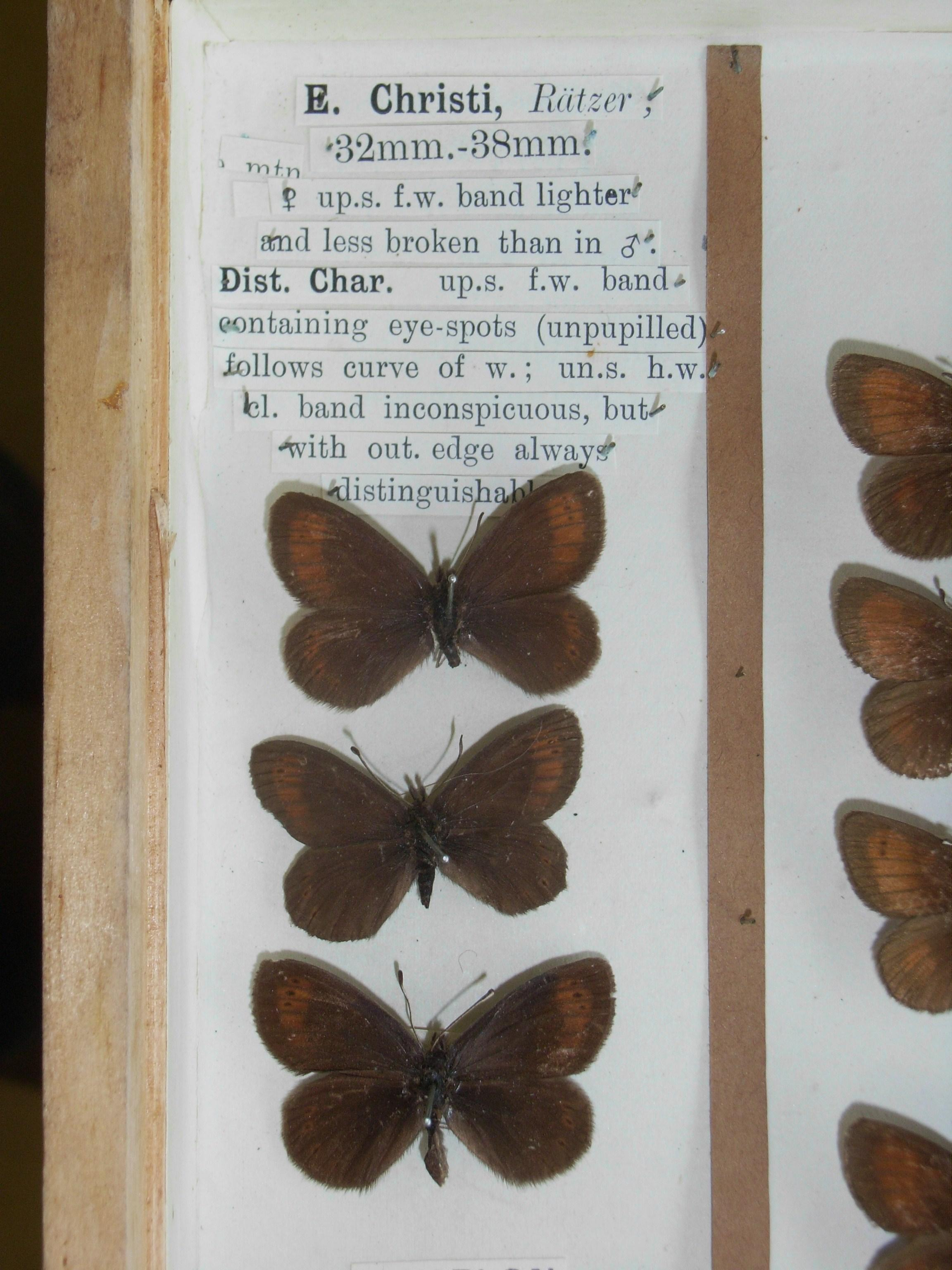
Museum specimens. Switzerland. Wheeler collection. Ulster Museum.

== Description in Seitz ==
E. christi Rätzer (36 c). This species comes nearest to cassiope, being however at least one-third larger. The forewing more elongate than in cassiope, apex and distal margin rounded, also in the hindwing, the apex of the latter being obtusely pointed in cassiope. The brown transverse band of the forewing is of even width and runs parallel with the distal margin, being sharply defined proximally and distally and separated by the veins into spots, usually 6. The 2. and 3. of these spots counted from the costal side are not prolonged both ways as is cassiope, but are of the same size as the others. In the upper spots there is a straight row of 3 or 4 black dots, of which the 2 middle ones are always larger than the others. The hindwing bears 4, more rarely 3, oval russet-yellow spots with ovate black dots, which in the female are sometimes prolonged to streaks. The underside of the forewing is russet-brown, being darker basally, the lighter band contrasting distinctly with the central area. Costal and distal margins brown-grey. Only the 2 central black dots are as large as above, while the others are either completely absent or are represented but by small black specks. The hindwing beneath violet-grey, with a darker dentate band, which is obsolete in the female, but distinct in the male. — The only locality so far known is the Laquin Valley at the southern Simplon-road below the village of Simplon. The flight-place is very limited, having only an extent of 5–600 m, consisting of grassy and flowery slopes covered with rocks and boulders. The butterfly is not abundant. Wheeler (1903) gives a short description.
