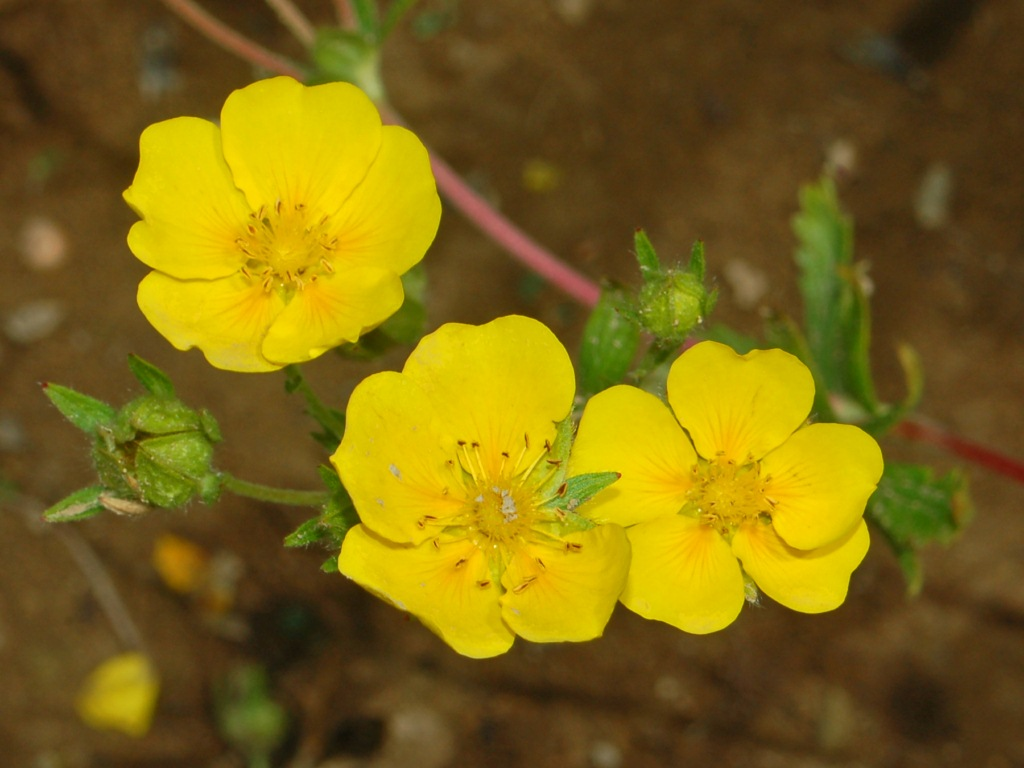

Conservation status
- Vulnerable (IUCN 3.1)

Scientific classification
- Kingdom: Plantae
- Clade: Tracheophytes
- Clade: Angiosperms
- Clade: Eudicots
- Clade: Rosids
- Order: Rosales
- Family: Rosaceae
- Genus: Potentilla
- Species: P. delphinensis

Binomial name
- Potentilla delphinensis Gren. & Godron

Synonyms
- Potentilla intermedia L. subsp. delphinensis (Gren. & Godr.) Bon.; Potentilla pratensis

= Potentilla delphinensis =

Species of flowering plant

Potentilla delphinensis is a herbaceous perennial species of cinquefoil belonging to the family Rosaceae. It is endemic to France, where it is limited to the southern French Alps (Savoie et Dauphiné: Bauges; Isère; Hautes-Alpes, Col du Lautaret).

== Description ==
The biological form of Potentilla delphiniensis is hemicryptophyte scapose, as its overwintering buds are situated just below the soil surface and the floral axis is more or less erect with a few leaves.

This plant has an erect, strong and hirsute stem reaching on average 30–50 centimetres (12–20 in) in height. The leaves are in rosette, hairy, with a long petiole and are divided into five obovate and toothed leaflets with elongate lanceolate stipules. The inflorescence has several large flowers (about 2.5 centimetres (0.98 in) in diameter), with a corolla of yellow petals. The flowering period extends from July through August. It is insect-pollinated.

It is sympatric with the similar congeners Potentilla grandiflora and Potentilla thuringiaca. It grows in sunny, rocky areas and mountain pastures at an altitude of 1,500–2,800 metres (4,900–9,200 ft) above sea level.

== Gallery ==
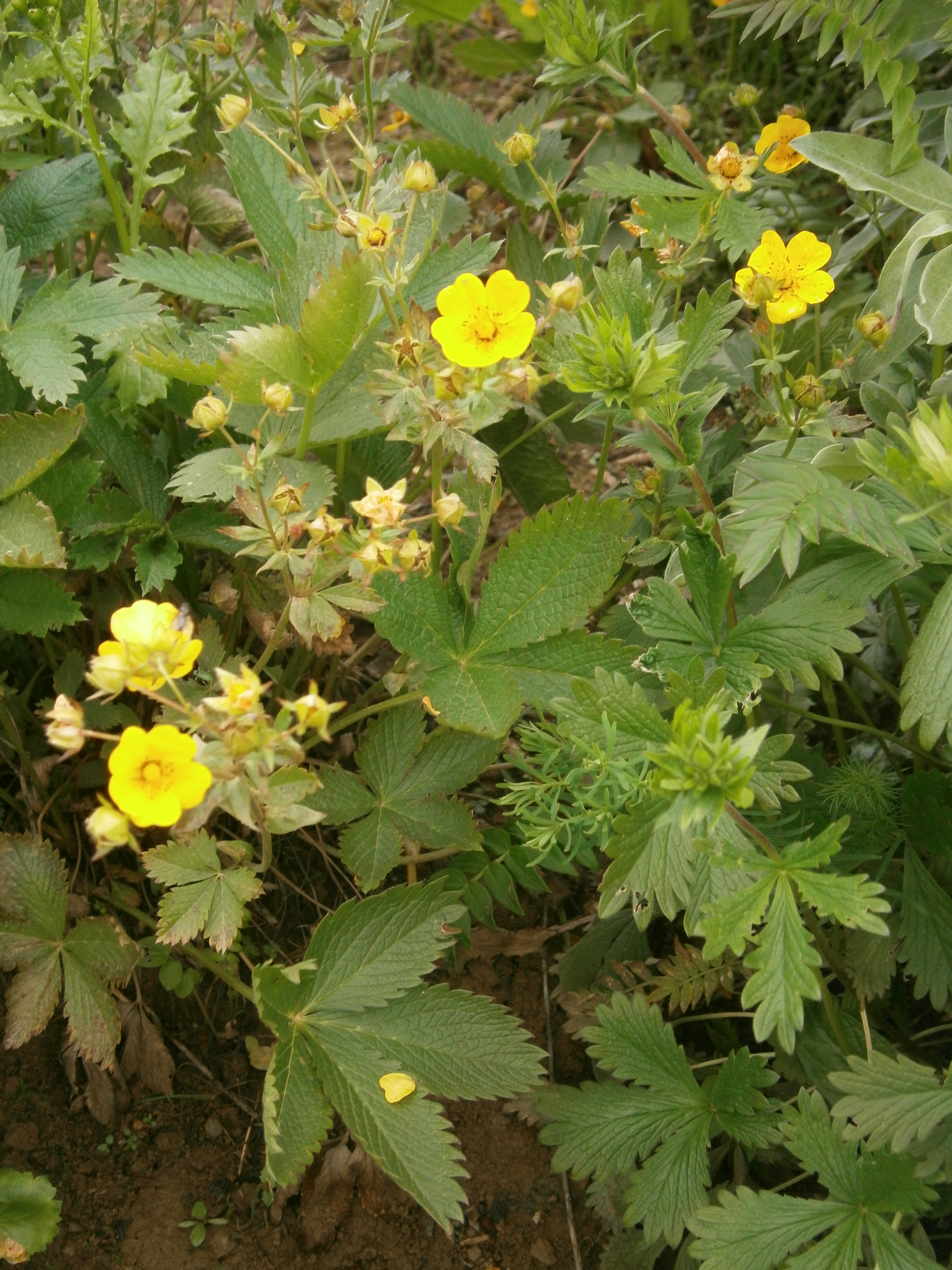
Plant

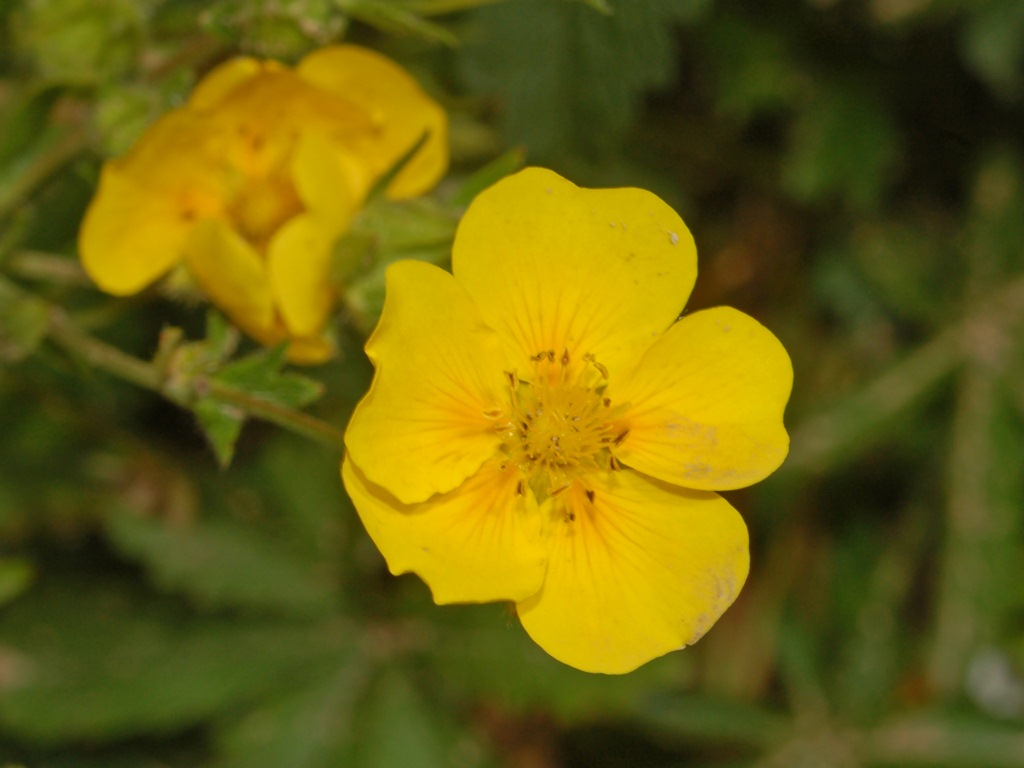
Flower

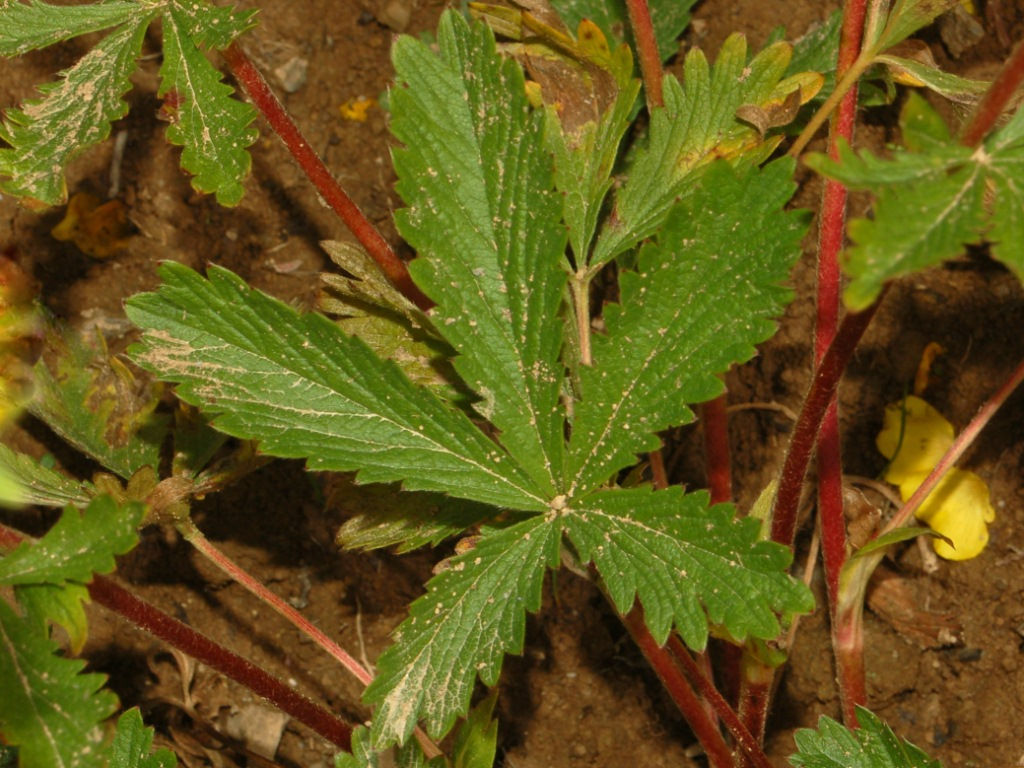
Leaf
