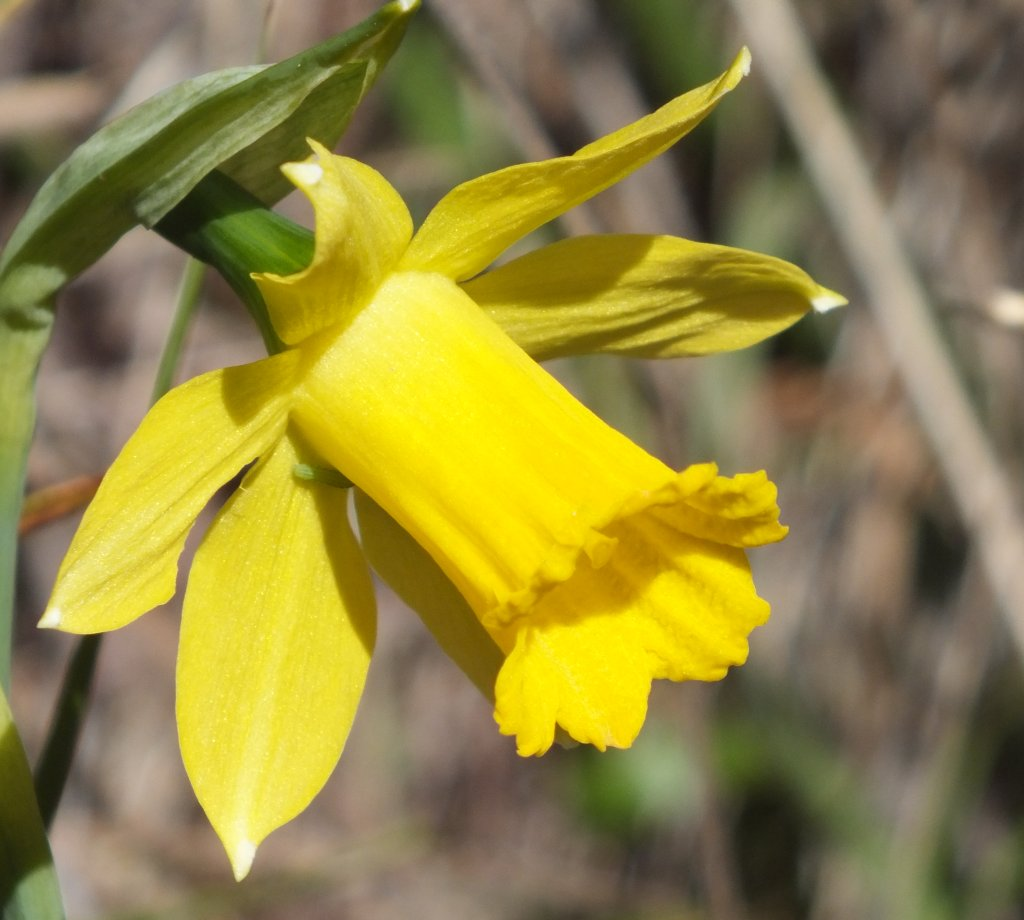

Conservation status
- Endangered (IUCN 3.1)

Scientific classification
- Kingdom: Plantae
- Clade: Tracheophytes
- Clade: Angiosperms
- Clade: Monocots
- Order: Asparagales
- Family: Amaryllidaceae
- Subfamily: Amaryllidoideae
- Genus: Narcissus
- Species: N. longispathus

Binomial name
- Narcissus longispathus Degen & Hervier ex Pugsley

= Narcissus longispathus =

Species of daffodil

Narcissus longispathus is a species of bulbous plant that is endemic to Spain. Its natural habitat is rivers. It is threatened by habitat loss. This distinctive daffodil species grows in permanently damp meadows and spring-fed stream banks in mountainous areas of Andalusia. Despite surviving in only ten subpopulations across several mountain ranges, it maintains high genetic diversity, with most variation occurring within rather than between populations.

== Genetic diversity and population structure ==
Allozyme analyses across 27 populations of the daffodil have revealed surprisingly high genetic variation for a species confined to a few fragmented mountain habitats. By screening enzyme variants (allozymes) at 19 gene-loci in 858 plants, researchers found that 68 % of loci were polymorphic—that is, they existed in more than one form—and that, on average, there were 2.1 alleles per locus. Although some small or isolated populations showed modest reductions in allelic richness, most genetic diversity (roughly 84 %) was maintained within individual populations rather than between them. Observed levels of heterozygosity (the proportion of individuals carrying two different alleles at a locus) were only slightly lower than expected under random mating, indicating little inbreeding despite the species' patchy distribution.

Spatial analyses uncovered a clear pattern of isolation by distance operating over very short ranges. Genetic similarity between populations declined steeply with increasing separation up to about 4 km, beyond which genetic drift (the random change in allele frequencies) became the dominant force shaping divergence. This was supported both by a "piecewise" regression of genetic versus geographic distance—showing a sharp breakpoint at 3.9 km—and by autocorrelation analyses of individual plants, which detected significant genetic clustering only within the first 3–4 km (the distance class over which gene flow through pollinators and occasional water-borne seed movement remains effective).

At the broadest scale, Bayesian clustering methods identified three principal "gene pools" or genetic groups corresponding roughly to north-eastern, north-western and south-western parts of the species' range. Populations at the range margins tend to derive predominantly from a single one of these groups, whereas central populations have extensive genetic admixture, reflecting historical and ongoing mixing of lineages.

== Conservation ==
Narcissus longispathus is assessed as Vulnerable by the IUCN owing to its restricted extent of occurrence, ongoing decline in habitat quality and extreme fluctuations in the number of mature individuals. Endemic to Andalusia, it survives in ten subpopulations across the Sierra de Cazorla, Segura and Las Villas, with additional outlying occurrences in the Sierras de Castril and Mágina and Montes de Jaén (the latter of which may represent a distinct taxon). Of these, eight subpopulations are confirmed—two on Sierra de Mágina (5,157 mature plants), one in Montes de Jaén (2 300) and five in Sierra de Cazorla (12,579)—but annual counts vary markedly and two presumed sites have not been refound.

This bulbous geophyte is confined to permanently damp meadows and spring‐fed stream banks, typically occurring with rushes (Scirpoides holoschoenus), soft grass (Holcus mollis), satyr grass (Piptatherum verae) and spike‐rush (Eleocharis nigricans). Its survival is jeopardised by any alteration of the natural water regime—whether through drainage, groundwater extraction or climatic shifts—alongside trampling and grazing by herbivores and occasional wild collection of bulbs. Conservation measures include legal protection within several national parks, ex situ seed banking at the Andalusian Genebank and the Torre del Vinagre Botanical Garden, ongoing cultivation and propagation efforts, and the implementation of a dedicated species recovery plan.

== Bibliography ==
- Narcissus longispathus Herrera Lab., Spain Archived 2014-06-08 at the Wayback Machine
