= Serra de Santo António =

- Civil parish
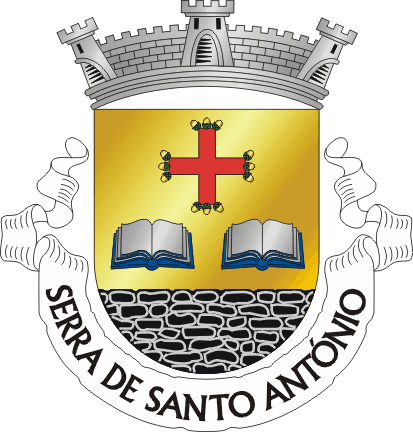
- Coat of arms

- Location in Portugal
- Coordinates: 39.515556°N 8.728889°W
- Country: Portugal
- Region: Centro
- District: Santarém
- Municipality: Alcanena

Area
  - Total: 14.62 km^{2} (5.64 sq mi)

Population (2011)
  - Total: 725
  - Density: 49.6/km^{2} (128/sq mi)
- Time zone: UTC+00:00 (WET)
  - Summer (DST): UTC+01:00 (WEST)
- Website: juntadaserra.pt

Serra de Santo António is a civil parish in the municipality of Alcanena, Portugal. It was formed in 1918, celebrating its 100th birthday in 2018. Mostly known for its Limestone buildings, walls, and natural caves, which are part of Serras de Aire e Candeeiros Nature Park(PNSAC). The population in 2011 was 725.
