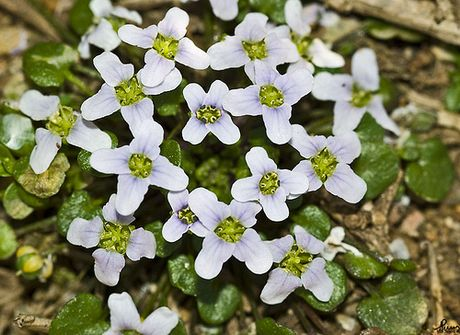

Conservation status
- Least Concern (IUCN 3.1)

- Least Concern (IUCN 3.1)

Scientific classification
- Kingdom: Plantae
- Clade: Tracheophytes
- Clade: Angiosperms
- Clade: Eudicots
- Clade: Rosids
- Order: Brassicales
- Family: Brassicaceae
- Genus: Ionopsidium
- Species: I. acaule

Binomial name
- Ionopsidium acaule (Desf.) DC. ex Rchb.

Synonyms
- Cochlearia acaulis Desf.; Cochlearia pusilla Brot.; Cochlearia olisiponensis Brot.

= Ionopsidium acaule =

Species of plant

Ionopsidium acaule (Portuguese: cocleária-menor) is a species of flowering plant in the crucifer family Brassicaceae, endemic to coastal Portugal, specifically from Nazaré to Sagres. It inhabits wet sandy substrates, in clearings of junipers, pine forests and other xerophytic scrub. Sometimes semi-ruderal on roadsides. More rarely, on calcareous or basaltic-derived soils.
