= Erigeron frigidus =

Conservation status
- Endangered (IUCN 3.1)

Scientific classification
- Kingdom: Plantae
- Clade: Tracheophytes
- Clade: Angiosperms
- Clade: Eudicots
- Clade: Asterids
- Order: Asterales
- Family: Asteraceae
- Genus: Erigeron
- Species: E. frigidus

Binomial name
- Erigeron frigidus Boiss. ex DC. (1838)

Synonyms
- Aster alpinus var. hispidus Lag. & Rodr. (1802); Erigeron hispidus (Lag. & Rodr.) Vierh. (1906), nom. illeg.; Erigeron uniflorus subsp. frigidus (Boiss. ex DC.) Arcang. (1882); Erigeron uniflorus var. frigidus (Boiss. ex DC.) Gand. (1892), nom. superfl.

Species of flowering plant

Erigeron frigidus, commonly known as zamárraga, is a species of flowering plant in the composite family, Asteraceae. It is a perennial endemic to the Sierra Nevada of southern Spain. It grows in subalpine grasslands in the highest portions of the range, from 3,000 to 3,400 meters elevation. It is recorded in two locations, and in 2011 it was estimated there were only 130 individuals.
