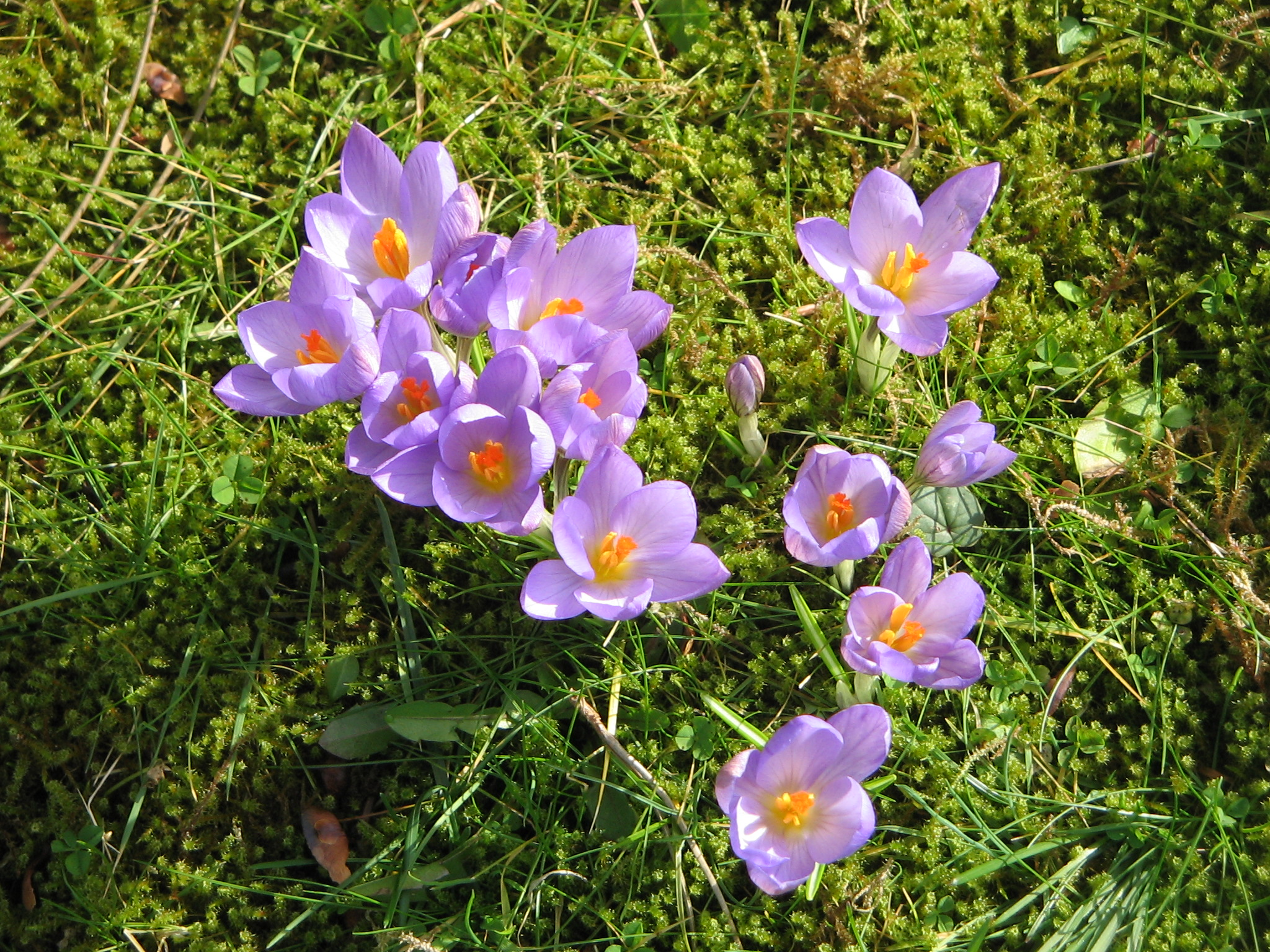

Conservation status
- Near Threatened (IUCN 3.1)

Scientific classification
- Kingdom: Plantae
- Clade: Tracheophytes
- Clade: Angiosperms
- Clade: Monocots
- Order: Asparagales
- Family: Iridaceae
- Genus: Crocus
- Species: C. etruscus

Binomial name
- Crocus etruscus Parl.

= Crocus etruscus =

Species of flowering plant

Crocus etruscus (Tuscan crocus) is a species of flowering plant in the genus Crocus of the family Iridaceae, endemic to woodlands of Central Tuscany (Italy). It is a cormous perennial growing to 8 cm (3.1 in) tall. The lilac flowers with purple veining and prominent orange stigmas appear in early spring.

== Description ==
Crocus etruscus is a herbaceous perennial geophyte growing from a corm. The corm is globe shaped with a flat top, the tunic is coarsely netted and a secondary star-shaped tunic is produced around the basal plate (where the roots are generated). Flowers are lavender-blue with gray-blue outer surfaces that are marked with dark veining. The three-branched, orange-red stigma is generally taller than the anthers. Flowering occurs in late winter- early spring. Plants are self-incompatible, meaning that viable seeds are not produced when pollination occurs among flowers of the same corm. The anthers open up away from the center of the flower to release pollen.

== Habitat ==
It is found growing in sub-Mediterranean deciduous woods and stony fields; the species may be in bloom from February to April. The species is almost extinct in the wild. It has a restricted natural range, being endemic to the southwestern part of Tuscany.

In nature the plant has "near-threatened" status. However, it also appears in cultivation. It has gained the Royal Horticultural Society's Award of Garden Merit.

== Cultivars ==
- Crocus etruscus 'Zwanenburg' is a cultivar with flowers that are pale violet-gray. The flowers have lilac-blue and deep violet-blue striations, with pale yellow throats, and orange anthers.
- Crocus etruscus 'Rosalind' is a cultivar with soft pink flowers.
