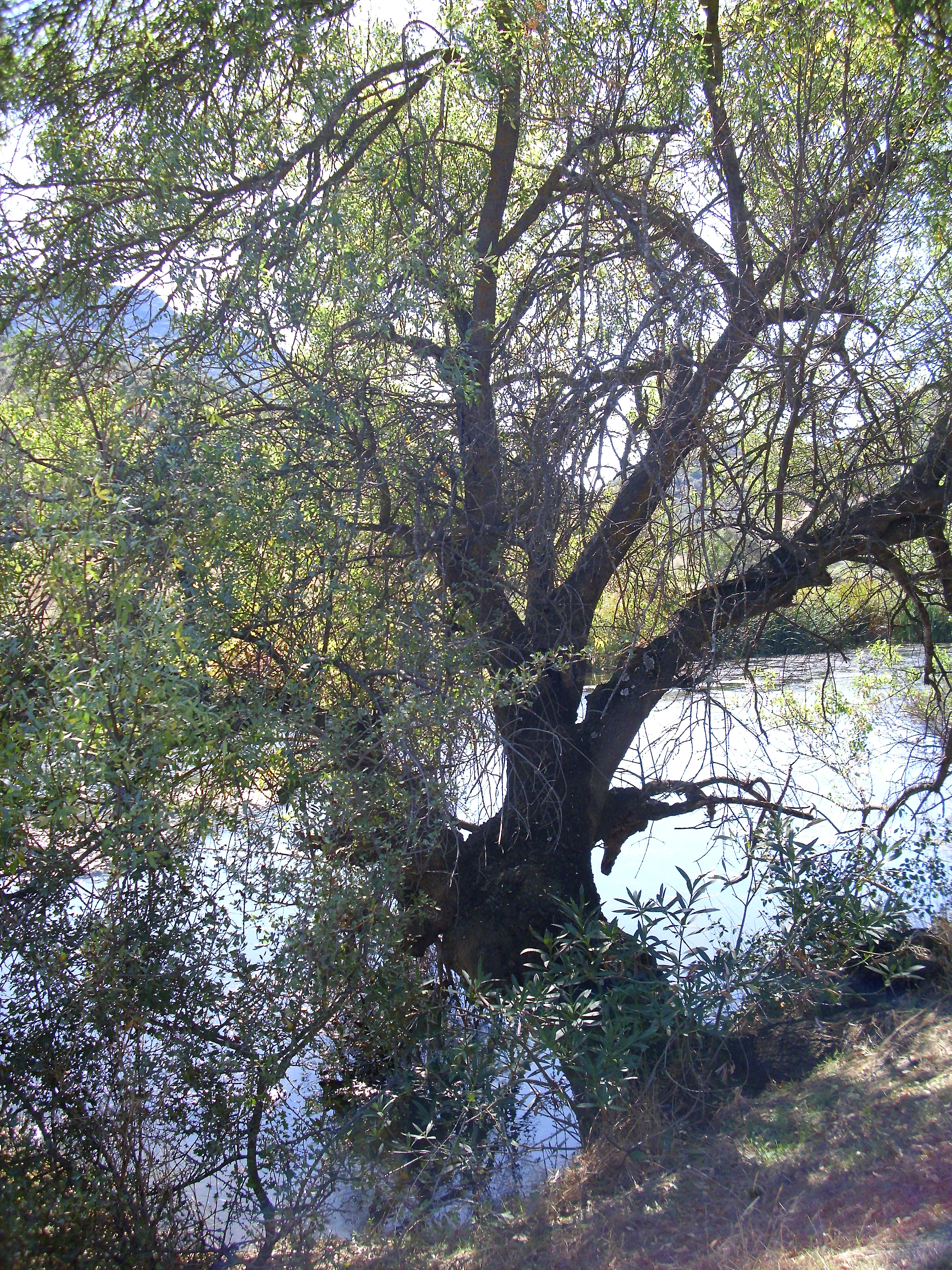

Conservation status
- Least Concern (IUCN 3.1)

Scientific classification
- Kingdom: Plantae
- Clade: Tracheophytes
- Clade: Angiosperms
- Clade: Eudicots
- Clade: Rosids
- Order: Malpighiales
- Family: Salicaceae
- Genus: Salix
- Species: S. salviifolia

Binomial name
- Salix salviifolia Brot., 1804
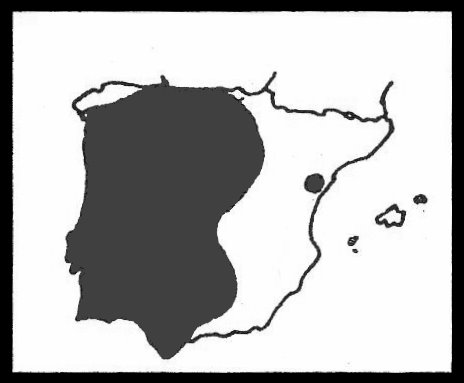
- Distribution of Salix salviifolia in the Iberian Peninsula.

= Salix salviifolia =

Shrub in the genus of willows

Salix salviifolia is a shrub in the willow family.

== Characteristics ==
It is a shrub 1 to 3 m high. It has grayish pubescent branches.

The leaves are of a moderate width, more or less elliptical or oblanceolate, whitish. They have the underside with a fluff of hair that gives it a whitish appearance.

The twigs have dense but short hairs.

== Distribution ==
It is an endemic of the Iberian Peninsula, where it is found in the center and in the western half. Abundant in the Central System, Montes de Toledo, Sierra Morena, Extremadura, Duero depression, Tagus depression, Guadiana depression.

== Taxonomy ==
Salix salviifolia was described by Viktor Ferdinand Brotherus and published in Fl. Lusit. 1: 29, 1804.
