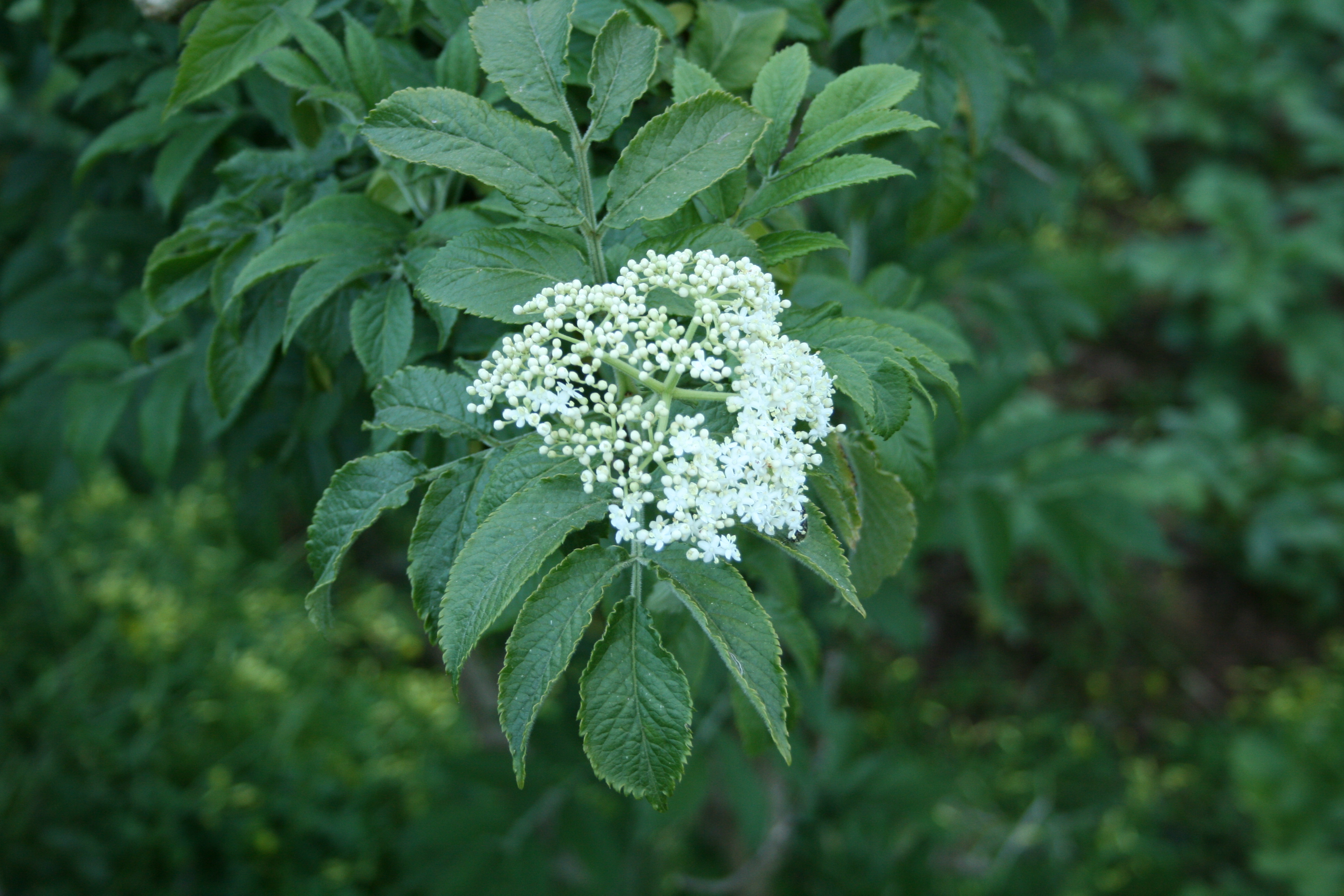

Scientific classification
- Kingdom: Plantae
- Clade: Embryophytes
- Clade: Tracheophytes
- Clade: Spermatophytes
- Clade: Angiosperms
- Clade: Eudicots
- Clade: Asterids
- Order: Dipsacales
- Family: Viburnaceae
- Genus: Sambucus
- Species: S. palmensis

Binomial name
- Sambucus palmensis Link

Synonyms
- Sambucus nigra L. subsp. palmensis (Link) Bolli

= Sambucus palmensis =

Species of shrub

Sambucus palmensis is a species of shrub or small tree in the family Viburnaceae. It is endemic to the Canary Islands and is present in the laurel forest. It can reach 6 m tall and yields blackish berries.
