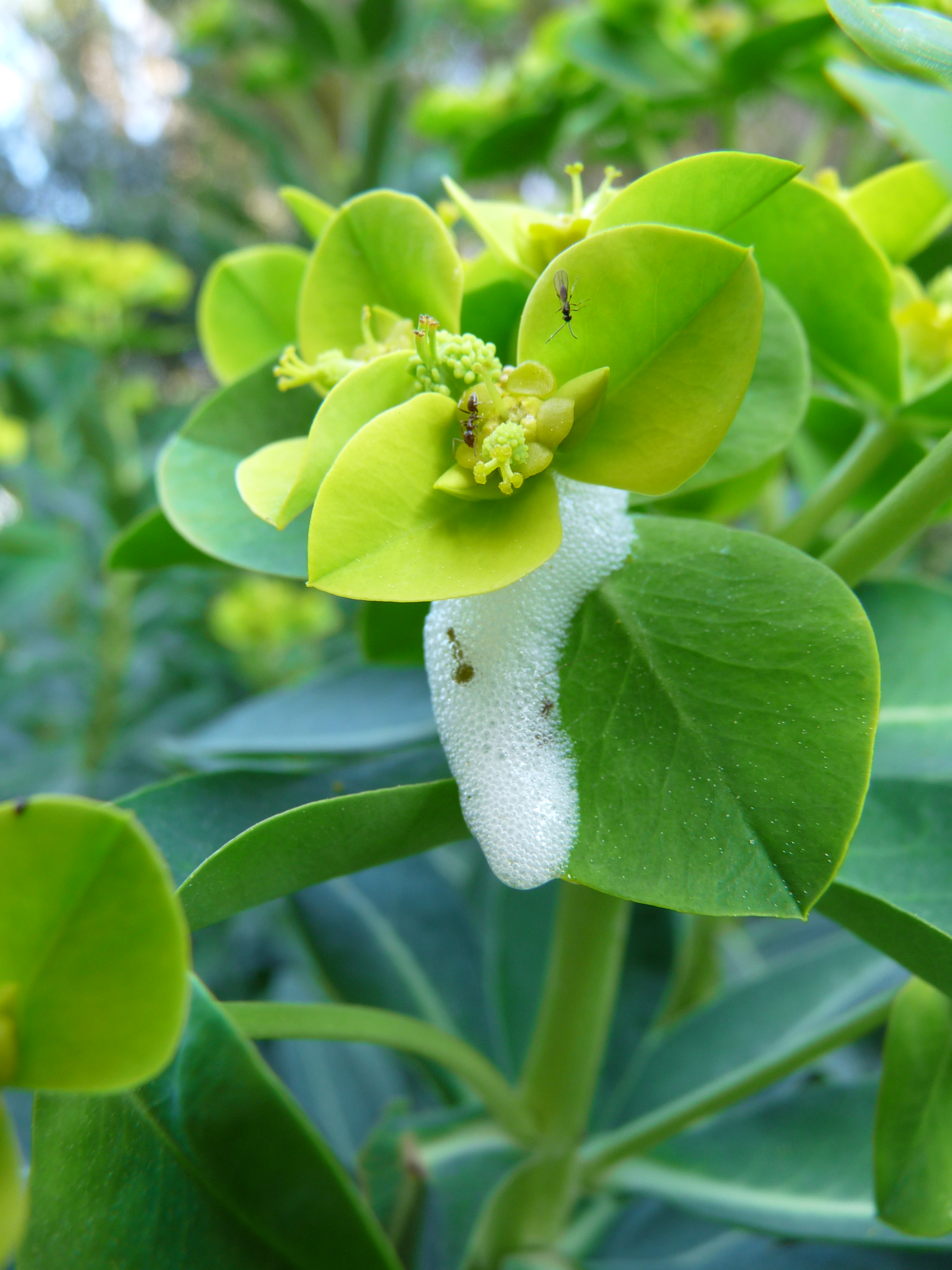

Conservation status
- Vulnerable (IUCN 3.1)

Scientific classification
- Kingdom: Plantae
- Clade: Tracheophytes
- Clade: Angiosperms
- Clade: Eudicots
- Clade: Rosids
- Order: Malpighiales
- Family: Euphorbiaceae
- Genus: Euphorbia
- Species: E. margalidiana

Binomial name
- Euphorbia margalidiana Kühbier & Lewej

= Euphorbia margalidiana =

Species of flowering plant

Euphorbia margalidiana is a species of flowering plant in the spurge family Euphorbiaceae, endemic to the Balearic Islands, where its natural habitats are Mediterranean Matorral shrubland vegetation and rocky shores. An evergreen perennial or subshrub growing to 1.2 m (3.9 ft) tall and broad, It bears yellow-green flowers over a long period in the summer. It is particularly valued in cultivation for its tolerance of a wide range of conditions, including drought. Though hardy down to −10 °C (14 °F) it grows best in mild areas.

Like all euphorbias, it produces an irritant milky sap when cut or broken. All parts of the plant are toxic when ingested.

It has gained the Royal Horticultural Society's Award of Garden Merit.
