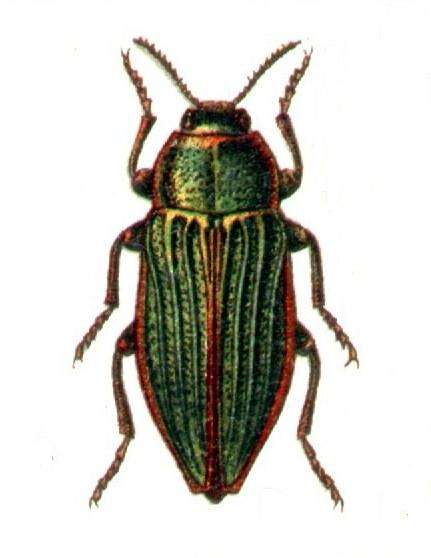

Conservation status
- Endangered (IUCN 3.1)

Scientific classification
- Kingdom: Animalia
- Phylum: Arthropoda
- Class: Insecta
- Order: Coleoptera
- Suborder: Polyphaga
- Infraorder: Elateriformia
- Family: Buprestidae
- Genus: Buprestis
- Species: B. splendens

Binomial name
- Buprestis splendens Fabricius, 1775

= Buprestis splendens =

Species of beetle

Buprestis splendens is a species of beetle in the family Buprestidae. It has a wide but scattered distribution from Western Europe to Russia. However, many records are old. There are confirmed post-2000 records from only in five countries: Austria, Italy, Poland, Romania, and Ukraine. Within each, it is only known from one site or region.

Buprestis splendens larvae develop in dead wood of large, sun-exposed trunks of Pinus spp., Larix decidua, and Picea abies. It is threatened with extinction by logging and by collection for illegal trade. This species is listed on Appendix II of the Bern Convention and Annex II and IV of the EU Habitats Directive.
