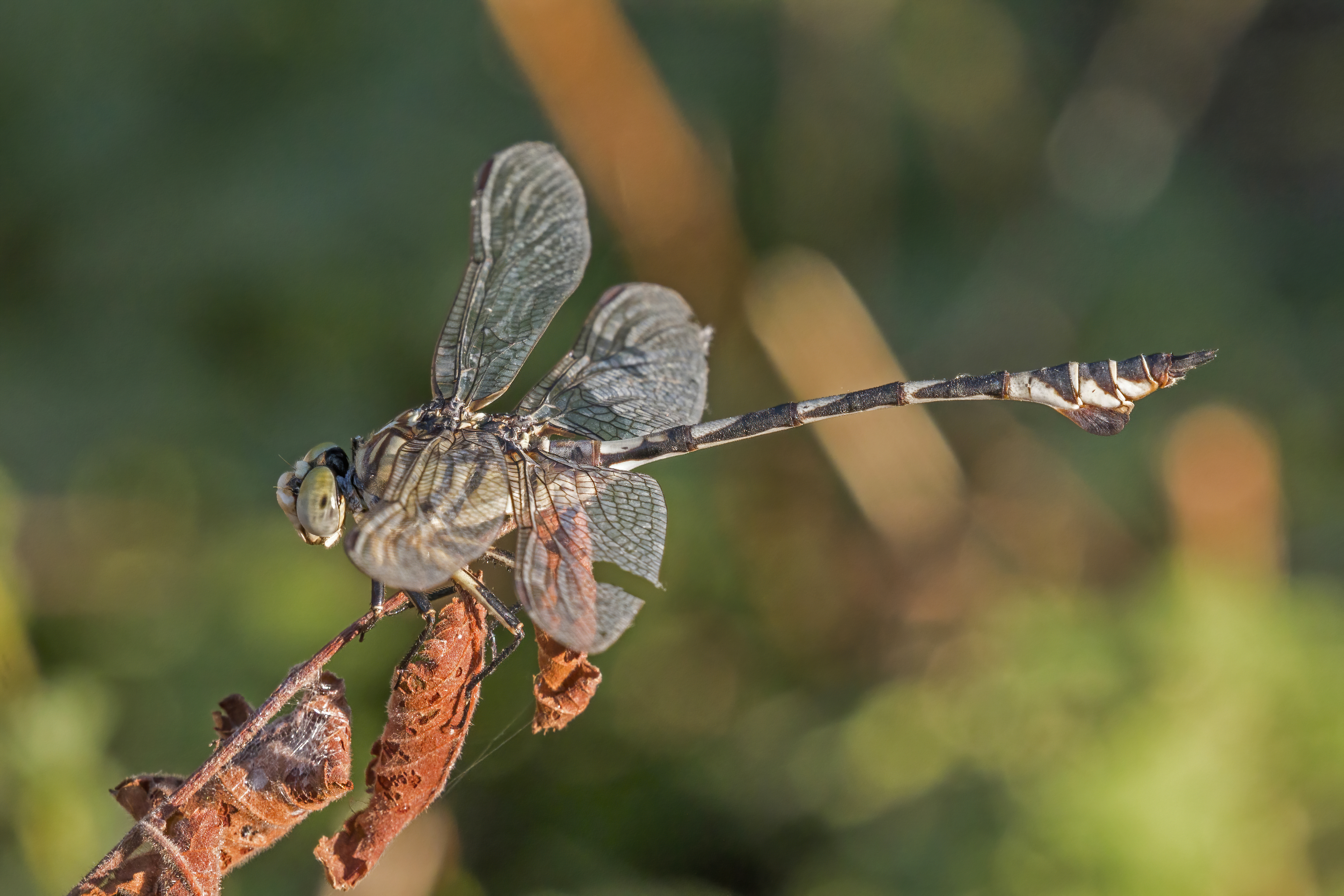
- Male photographed in North Macedonia

Conservation status
- Least Concern (IUCN 3.1)

Scientific classification
- Kingdom: Animalia
- Phylum: Arthropoda
- Clade: Pancrustacea
- Class: Insecta
- Order: Odonata
- Infraorder: Anisoptera
- Family: Gomphidae
- Genus: Lindenia de Haan, 1826
- Species: L. tetraphylla

Binomial name
- Lindenia tetraphylla (Vander Linden, 1825)

Synonyms
- Lindenia inkiti Bartenef, 1929

= Lindenia tetraphylla =

Lindenia tetraphylla Temporal range: Middle Miocene to present

Species of dragonfly

Lindenia tetraphylla, or bladetail, is a species of dragonfly from the family Gomphidae found in Central and Southwest Asia, and parts of the Mediterranean. It is the only extant representative of the monotypic genus Lindenia. A fossil relative, †Lindenia heeri Boderau, Engel, Stössel & Nel, 2024, is known from the Middle Miocene-aged Oehningen fossil site of Germany.

== Description ==
Adults are easily recognizable due to their impressive body size with 69–80 mm length, the leaf-shaped flaps on the bottom side of the abdomen tip which are unique in European species, and wing venation. The flaps give the narrow and long abdomen club-shaped appearance. Basic color is pale yellow with dark brown or black markings of variable size. The pterostigma is also similarly colored. In south Croatia and Montenegro, it is possible to observe completely black individuals, which is probably a consequence of them developing in cold springs.

The adults fly in the summer, from the end of May until August.

== Habitat and distribution ==
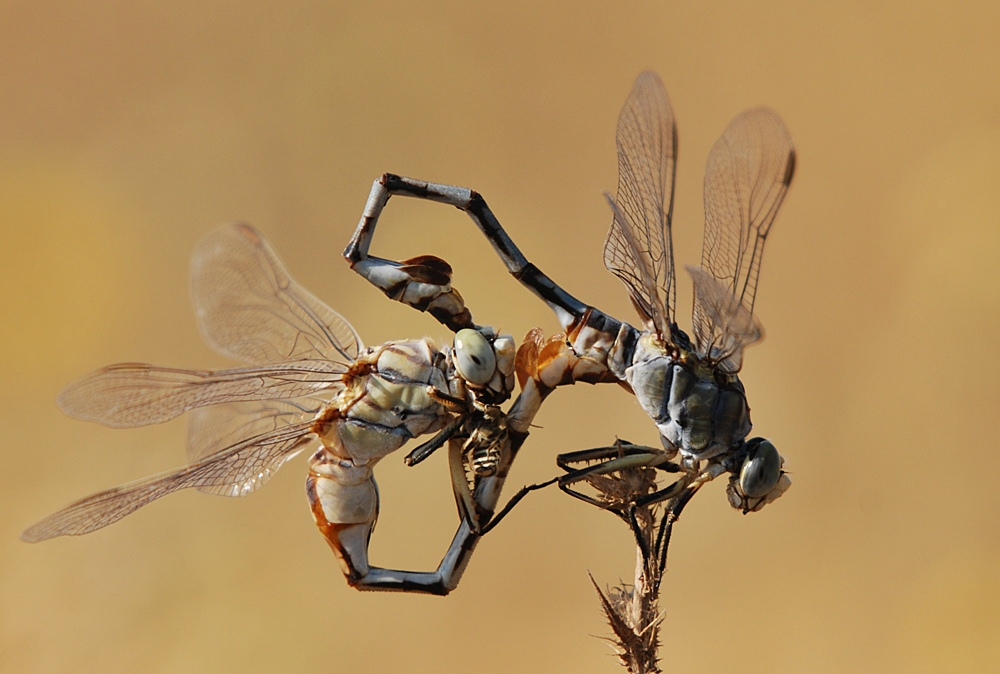
A male and a female forming a copulatory "wheel"

Bladetail breeds in larger lakes and larger, slowly flowing rivers. Adults tend to wander far from where they hatched, and may colonize new bodies of water, such as abandoned gravel pits, as a pioneer species. They are however more commonly found above lakes with wide reed beds or floating patches of aquatic plants in which the females oviposit.

The species has a broad distribution range in most parts of Central and Southwest Asia, and eastern Mediterranean. However, it is scattered throughout the range, and higher population densities are only a local occurrence. In the Mediterranean, it is restricted to coastal plains. The largest local population is probably found on the banks of Lake Skadar on the border between Albania and Montenegro where a 2011 field census estimated one million individuals, but Lake Skadar is one of only two known sites in Montenegro where Bladetails are present. Individuals can occasionally wander as far north as SW Slovenia where one specimen was caught in the 1960s, but none have been observed since. The northernmost known breeding population in the Mediterranean lives on the Croatian island of Cres. Only individual sightings of males are known for North Africa, and the species' current status there is unknown.
