= Common scops owl =

The vernacular name common scops owl may refer to any of three species in the scops-owl genus Otus. They were formerly considered conspecific and are allopatric, meaning that only one species is found in any given place.

- In Europe and western Asia, the Eurasian scops owl (Otus scops)
- In southern Asia, the Oriental scops owl (Otus sunia)
- In Africa, the African scops owl (Otus senegalensis)
