= Boulengerula spawlsi =

Conservation status
- Critically Endangered (IUCN 3.1)

Scientific classification
- Kingdom: Animalia
- Phylum: Chordata
- Class: Amphibia
- Order: Gymnophiona
- Clade: Apoda
- Family: Herpelidae
- Genus: Boulengerula
- Species: B. spawlsi

Binomial name
- Boulengerula spawlsi Wilkinson, Malonza, Campbell, and Loader, 2017

Species of amphibian

Boulengerula spawlsi is a species of caecilian in the family Herpelidae. It is endemic to Kenya and only know from the vicinity of its type locality, Ngaia Forest Reserve, in the Nyambene Hills, Meru County; the type locality is also spelled "Ngaya" or "Ngaja". The specific name spawlsi honours Stephen Spawls who first collected this species and who has contributed substantially to African herpetology. Common name Spawls' boolee has been coined for it.

== Discovery and taxonomy ==
The first specimen was collected in the Nyambene Hills in 2007 and was considered most similar to Boulengerula denhardti. Additional specimens were found in 2008 and tentatively identified as Boulengerula denhardti. However, closer examination of these specimens, new specimens from the Nyambene Hills, and comparative material from museums revealed that these specimens represented a new species, which was formally described in 2017.

== Description ==
Adult males measure 221–231 mm (8.7–9.1 in) and adult females 222–253 mm (8.7–10.0 in) in total length. The eyes are not visible. The snout projects strongly beyond the recessed mouth. The body has 150 to 157 annular grooves and is subcylindrical, slightly dorsoventrally flattened. The maximum midbody width is 3.8 mm (0.1 in). Dorsal colouration is slightly purplish blue. The flanks and the ventral side are slightly paler. The head and the throat are pinkish. The tip of the snout is pale. The annular grooves are whitish.

== Habitat and conservation ==
Boulengerula spawlsi is known from the Ngaia Forest Reserve at elevations of 1,300–1,419 m (4,265–4,656 ft) above sea level. Specimens have been dug from soil in a hollowed-out base of the trunk of a large fallen tree, under stones and rotting logs, or found in leaf-litter debris. It appears to be uncommon or at least difficult to find. Whether it occurs outside the forest is unknown. Collection of logs for firewood could threaten the species. A degree of protection is offered by the type locality being a protected area.
