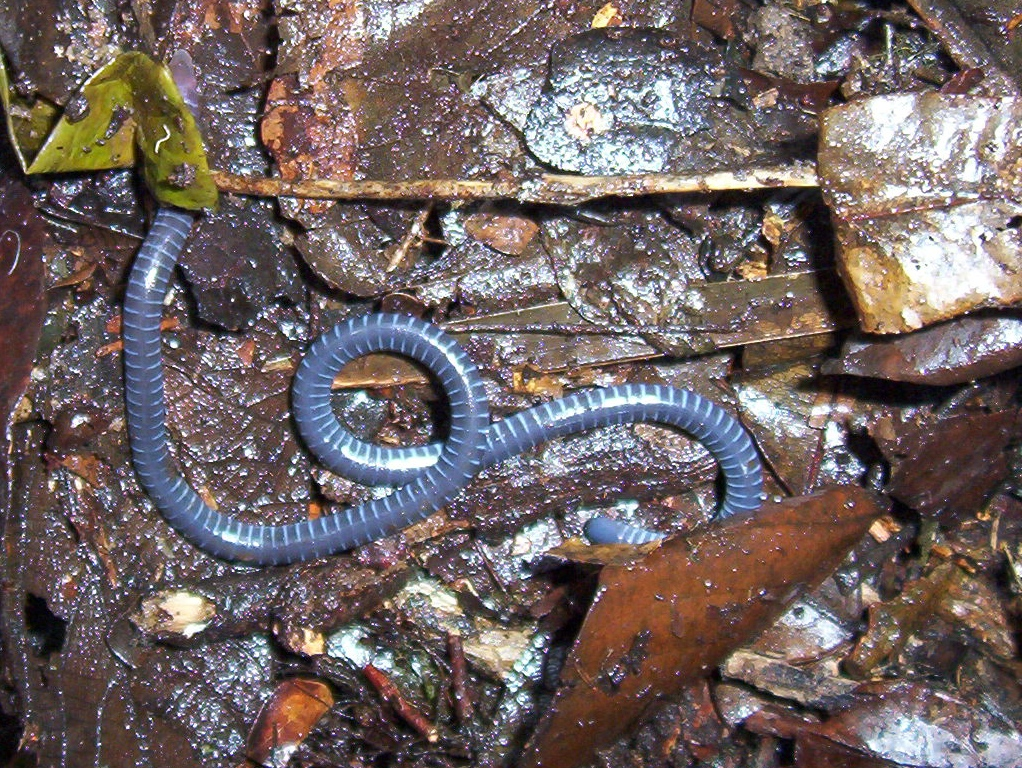
- Specimen of Boulengerula taitanus. The head can't be seen because the animal is digging, to return underground.

Conservation status
- Least Concern (IUCN 3.1)

Scientific classification
- Kingdom: Animalia
- Phylum: Chordata
- Class: Amphibia
- Order: Gymnophiona
- Clade: Apoda
- Family: Herpelidae
- Genus: Boulengerula
- Species: B. boulengeri

Binomial name
- Boulengerula boulengeri Tornier, 1896

= Boulengerula boulengeri =

Species of amphibian

Boulengerula boulengeri is a species of amphibian in the family Herpelidae. It is endemic to the Usambara Mountains, Tanzania. Its natural habitats are subtropical or tropical moist lowland forests, subtropical or tropical moist montane forests, arable land, plantations, rural gardens, and heavily degraded former forest. It is threatened by habitat loss.

It is possible that what we now call Boulengerula boulengeri contains two unnamed, cryptic species.

== Taste Buds ==
Boulengerula boulengeri are the first organisms in which occurrence of taste buds in the terrestrial animals was found. Taste buds are present in larval forms, whereas there is taste discs in adults. Investigation took place in this organism using standard light and scanning electron microscopy. They found only taste bud type organs to be present in B. boulengeri. These occur mainly in the mucosa of the oral cavity, mainly near the teeth. Their results suggest that B. boulengeri possesses only one type of gustatory organ during its ontogeny.

== Habitat ==
B. boulengeri is interpreted as predominantly a burrower in soil, The vast majority of all vertebrate specimens dug from the top 300 mm of soil were B. boulengeri is most abundant in East Usambara forest soils.
