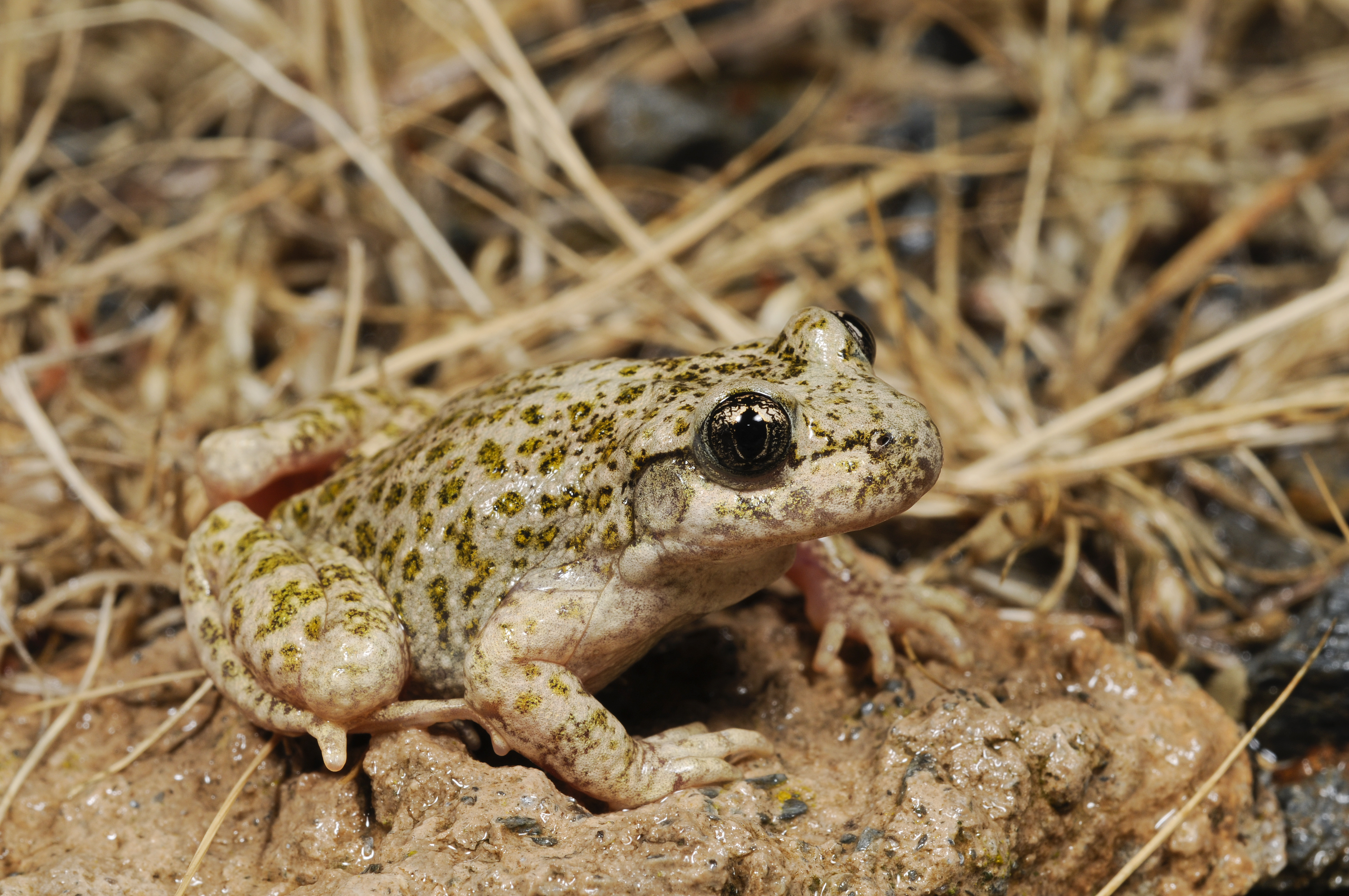

Conservation status
- Endangered (IUCN 3.1)

Scientific classification
- Kingdom: Animalia
- Phylum: Chordata
- Class: Amphibia
- Order: Anura
- Family: Alytidae
- Genus: Alytes
- Species: A. dickhilleni

Binomial name
- Alytes dickhilleni Arntzen & García Paris, 1995
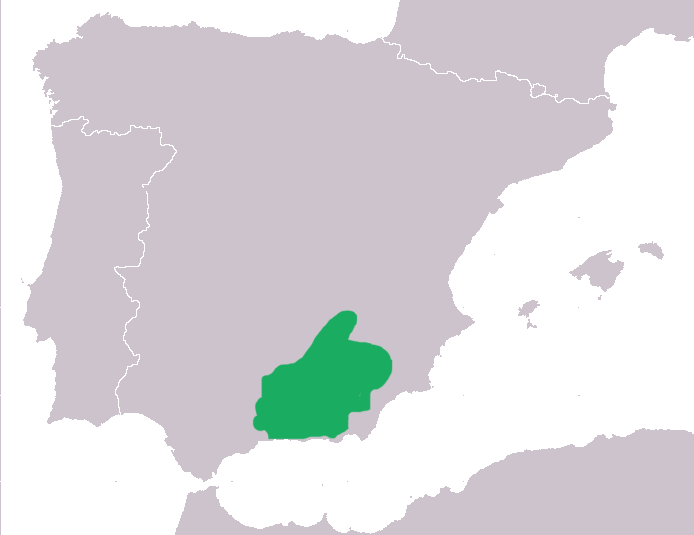

= Betic midwife toad =

Species of frog

The Betic midwife toad or Sapo Partero Bético (Alytes dickhilleni) is a species of frog in the family Alytidae (formerly Discoglossidae). It is endemic to mountains in south eastern Spain. Its natural habitats are temperate forests, freshwater marshes, intermittent freshwater marshes, pastureland, ponds, and aquaculture ponds. It is threatened by habitat loss.

== Description ==
The Betic midwife toad is grey, finely mottled with dark and pale specks. Its length may be about 3.5 centimetres (1.4 in) and it has bulging eyes with vertical slit pupils. There is a distinctive grey area between the eyes and the parotoid glands are relatively small. There is a lateral line of whitish glandular tubercles on the body but an absence of the orange glandular spots found in other members of the genus.

== Distribution and habitat ==
The Betic midwife toad is native to the Sierra Nevada Mountains in south eastern Spain. The population is fragmented as different mountains support separate populations. It is fairly common on Alcaraz, Segura and Cazorla mountains but less common on the drier Filabres, Baza and Gádor peaks. It is generally found in oak and pine forests and in open rocky areas, mostly on limestone, at elevations between 700 and 2,000 metres (2,300 and 6,600 ft). In drier parts it tends to be near springs.

== Biology ==
The Betic midwife toad is nocturnal and hides under rocks and in crevices during the day. The toads mate on land and the male coils the egg mass round his hind legs and carries it around until the developing tadpoles are ready to hatch. He then deposits them in suitable water bodies such as mountain streams, cattle troughs and reservoirs. The tadpoles are slow-growing and may overwinter before undergoing metamorphosis into juvenile frogs.

== Status ==
The IUCN lists this toad as endangered as its numbers appear to be in decline. The main threats it faces are the diminution in the number of suitable breeding sites due to drought, water abstraction and changes in agricultural practices. It is also at risk from the fungal disease chytridiomycosis.

On January 21, 2008, Evolutionarily Distinct and Globally Endangered (EDGE), per chief Helen Meredith identified nature's most weird, wonderful and endangered amphibians: "The EDGE amphibians are amongst the most remarkable and unusual species on the planet and yet an alarming 85% of the top 100 are receiving little or no conservation attention." The top 10 endangered species (in this List of endangered animal species) include: the Chinese giant salamander, a distant relative of the newt, the tiny Gardiner's Seychelles frog, the limbless Sagalla caecilian, South African ghost frogs, lungless Mexican salamanders, the Malagasy rainbow frog, Chile Darwin's frog and the Betic midwife toad.
