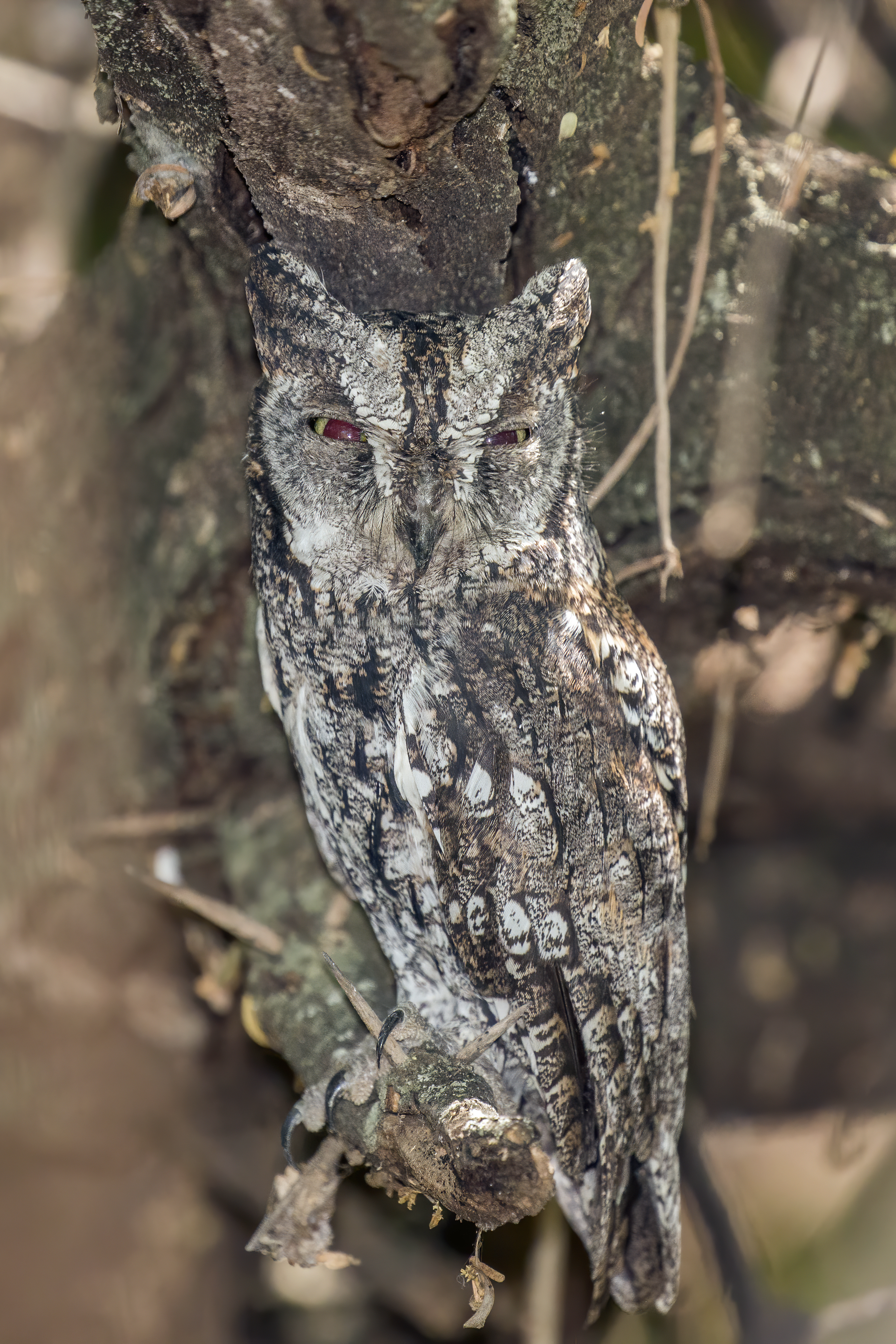
- Roosting at Lake Baringo, Kenya

Conservation status
- Least Concern (IUCN 3.1)
- CITES Appendix II

Scientific classification
- Kingdom: Animalia
- Phylum: Chordata
- Class: Aves
- Order: Strigiformes
- Family: Strigidae
- Genus: Otus
- Species: O. senegalensis

Binomial name
- Otus senegalensis (Swainson, 1837)

Audio
- Calls recorded in Samburu; National Reserve, Kenya

= African scops owl =

Species of owl

The African scops owl (Otus senegalensis) is a small owl which is widespread in sub-Saharan Africa.

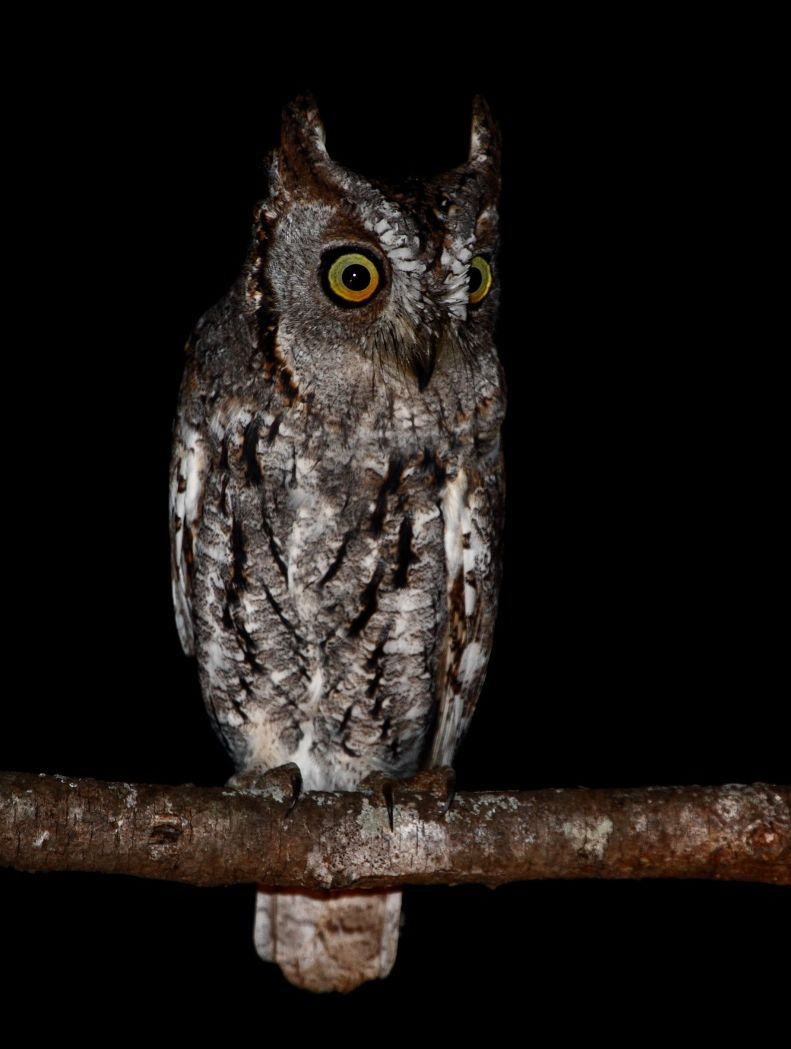
An African scops owl in the Zululand Rhino Reserve

== Taxonomy ==
The African scops owl was formally described in 1837 by the English zoologist William Swainson as Otus senegalensis based on a specimen collected in Senegal. The species is now one of 58 scops owls placed in the genus Otus.

Three subspecies are recognised:

- O. s. senegalensis (Swainson, WJ, 1837) – widespread sub-Saharan Africa
- O. s. nivosus Keith, GS & Twomey, AC, 1968 – southeastern Kenya (lower Tana River to Lali Hills)
- O. s. feae (Salvadori, AT, 1903) – island of Annobón (Pagulu) (Gulf of Guinea)

The subspecies O. s. feae has sometimes been recognised as a separate species, the Annobón scops owl. When describing the species in 1903, the Italian ornithologist Tommaso Salvadori noted that the birds were abundant in wooded areas at altitudes of 400–500 metres on the island. Few sightings of the bird have been reported since then.

== Description ==
The African scops owl is a small owl, measuring 17 cm (6.7 in) in length. It is typically greyish-brown, though sometimes pale rufous or warmer brown, and is cryptically marked with streaks and mottling. Its grey facial disk has a narrow black edge, and its eyes are yellow. It has ear tufts, which are generally kept lowered unless the bird is disturbed. The African scops owl is around 15–17 cm (5.9–6.7 in) in length with a wingspan of 45 cm (18 in).

=== Voice ===
The African scops owl gives a monotonous quivering distinctive "prrrp" at five second intervals.

=== Similar species ===
The migrant Eurasian scops owl is very similar to the African scops owl; while it is typically slightly larger, it may not be distinguishable in the field.

== Range and habitat ==
The African scops owl is endemic to sub-Saharan Africa. It ranges from sea level to 2,000 m (6,600 ft) in elevation, and is found in wooded habitats and forest edge, including in gardens and mangroves.

== Behaviour ==
The African scops owl is strictly nocturnal. During the day, it perches close to the trunk of a tree. When roosting in daylight, this species closes its eyes and extends its ear-tufts to give the impression of a tree branch, making it easily overlooked. Pairs sometimes roost together. The African scops owl is not as territorial as the Eurasian scops owl and will nest in loose aggregations, with the nest sites relatively close to each other.

The male and female may duet, calling all night both before and after leaving the roost site. The African scops owl lays four to six eggs directly onto the floor of a tree hollow, with laying occurring throughout April and June. Incubation lasts about 27 days, during which the female incubates the eggs and is fed by the male. Once the eggs hatch the young are fed by the female with food brought by the male. The young fledge in 30 days.

The prey of the African scops owl is mainly insects such as grasshoppers, beetles, crickets, moths etc. but also spiders, scorpions and small vertebrates. They normally hunt by scanning or listening from a perch and swooping down to capture prey on the ground, but will hawk for flying insects.
