= Herpele multiplicata =

Conservation status
- Data Deficient (IUCN 3.1)

Scientific classification
- Kingdom: Animalia
- Phylum: Chordata
- Class: Amphibia
- Order: Gymnophiona
- Clade: Apoda
- Family: Herpelidae
- Genus: Herpele
- Species: H. multiplicata

Binomial name
- Herpele multiplicata Nieden, 1912

Species of amphibian

Herpele multiplicata is a species of caecilian in the family Herpelidae. It is endemic to Cameroon. It is only known from its holotype, which is now lost. The only available information is the brief species description published in 1912 by Fritz Nieden. Common name Victoria caecilian has been coined for it.

== Type locality ==
The type locality was originally given as "Mundame am Mungo". However, Edward Harrison Taylor later gave the type locality as "Victoria", corresponding to the present-day Limbé, but this is likely erroneous.

== Description ==
The holotype measured 239 mm (9.4 in) in snout–vent length and was 4 mm (0.2 in) wide, albeit in a badly shrunken state. This species can be distinguished based on its high number of annuli. The original species description does not differentiate between primary and secondary annuli (the latter not reaching round the body), but the description can be interpreted as implying 166 primary annuli and eight (possibly more) secondary annuli. The first is the highest count for an African caecilian. The body likely ended in a small terminal cap. The eyes were likely hidden, given that they were not mentioned in the species description. Coloration was dark brown, with head lighter.

== Ecology ==
Ecology of this species is unknown.
