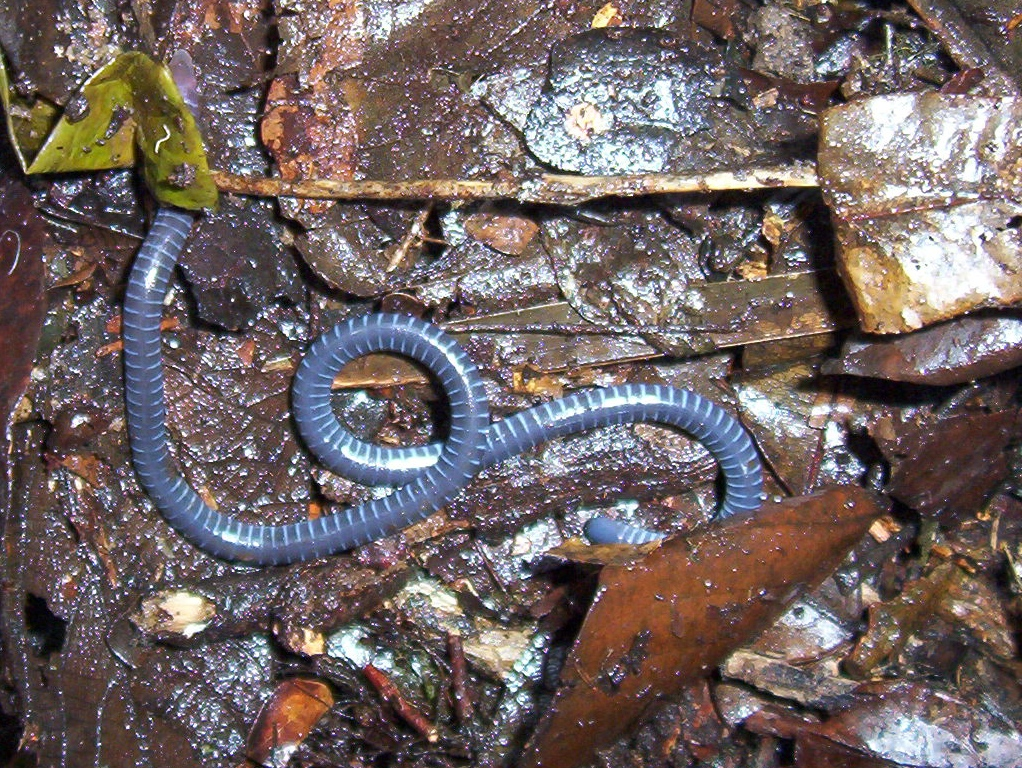

Conservation status
- Vulnerable (IUCN 3.1)

Scientific classification
- Kingdom: Animalia
- Phylum: Chordata
- Class: Amphibia
- Order: Gymnophiona
- Clade: Apoda
- Family: Herpelidae
- Genus: Boulengerula
- Species: B. fischeri

Binomial name
- Boulengerula fischeri Nussbaum and Hinkel, 1994

= Boulengerula fischeri =

Species of amphibian

Boulengerula fischeri is a species of caecilian in the family Herpelidae. It is endemic to Rwanda and only known from around its type locality near Cyangugu, southwestern Rwanda. The specific name fischeri honours Eberhard Fischer, a German botanist who has worked with Rwandan fauna and flora. Common name Fischer's African caecilian has been coined for it. Live animals have the appearance of "live pink spaghetti".

== Description ==
Adult males measure 301–386 mm (11.9–15.2 in) and adult females 257–397 mm (10.1–15.6 in) in total length. The holotype is an immature female 191 mm (7.5 in) in total length. The heaviest specimens weighs nearly 5 grams (0.2 oz). The body is very slender, with a maximum body width of 4.6 mm (0.2 in). There are 183–205 primary annuli. Colouration is pinkish, with the head and neck and the posterior few centimeters of the body a brighter pink than the midbody, or a paler pink head, vivid pink anteriorly, and the body becoming more lavender posteriorly.

== Habitat and conservation ==
Boulengerula fischeri is known from primary montane forest and small-holder farmland adjacent to the forest at elevations of 1,743–2,000 m (5,719–6,562 ft) above sea level. It lives in the soil, occasionally on the ground under leaf litter or plant stems. If similar to other Boulengerula, it would be oviparous and have direct development (no free-living larvae).

This species is locally abundant and tolerates some habitat modification. It could be threatened by deforestation and agricultural intensification, including the use of agrochemicals. The area of the type locality is now included in the Nyungwe Forest National Park.
