= Boulengerula uluguruensis =

Conservation status
- Least Concern (IUCN 3.1)

Scientific classification
- Kingdom: Animalia
- Phylum: Chordata
- Class: Amphibia
- Order: Gymnophiona
- Clade: Apoda
- Family: Herpelidae
- Genus: Boulengerula
- Species: B. uluguruensis

Binomial name
- Boulengerula uluguruensis Barbour & Loveridge, 1928

Species of amphibian

Boulengerula uluguruensis, the Uluguru pink caecilian or Uluguru African caecilian, is a species of amphibian in the family Caeciliidae. It is endemic to Tanzania where it is found in the Nguu, Nguru, and Uluguru Mountains. Its natural habitats are subtropical or tropical moist lowland forests, subtropical or tropical moist montane forests, rural gardens, and heavily degraded former forest.
