= Boulengerula changamwensis =

Conservation status
- Endangered (IUCN 3.1)

Scientific classification
- Kingdom: Animalia
- Phylum: Chordata
- Class: Amphibia
- Order: Gymnophiona
- Clade: Apoda
- Family: Herpelidae
- Genus: Boulengerula
- Species: B. changamwensis

Binomial name
- Boulengerula changamwensis Loveridge, 1932

Species of amphibian

Boulengerula changamwensis, the Changamwe caecilian, is a species of amphibian in the family Herpelidae. It is also known as Changamwensis African caecilian and Changamwe lowland caecilian. It is found in southern Kenya (Changamwe and the Shimba Hills) and Malawi, and possibly in the intervening Tanzania and Mozambique.

It is threatened by habitat loss for deforestation and collecting of firewood, agriculture and farming, herbicides and pesticides and expanding human settlement. It is protected by the Shimba Hills and parts of Shire Highlands but its protection in Kaya Forest may also be threatened by the deforestation and collecting of firewood. In 2012, the IUCN changed the status from Data Deficient to Endangered because it had a range of 990 square kilometres (380 sq mi) and was only known from three or four localities which have threats.
