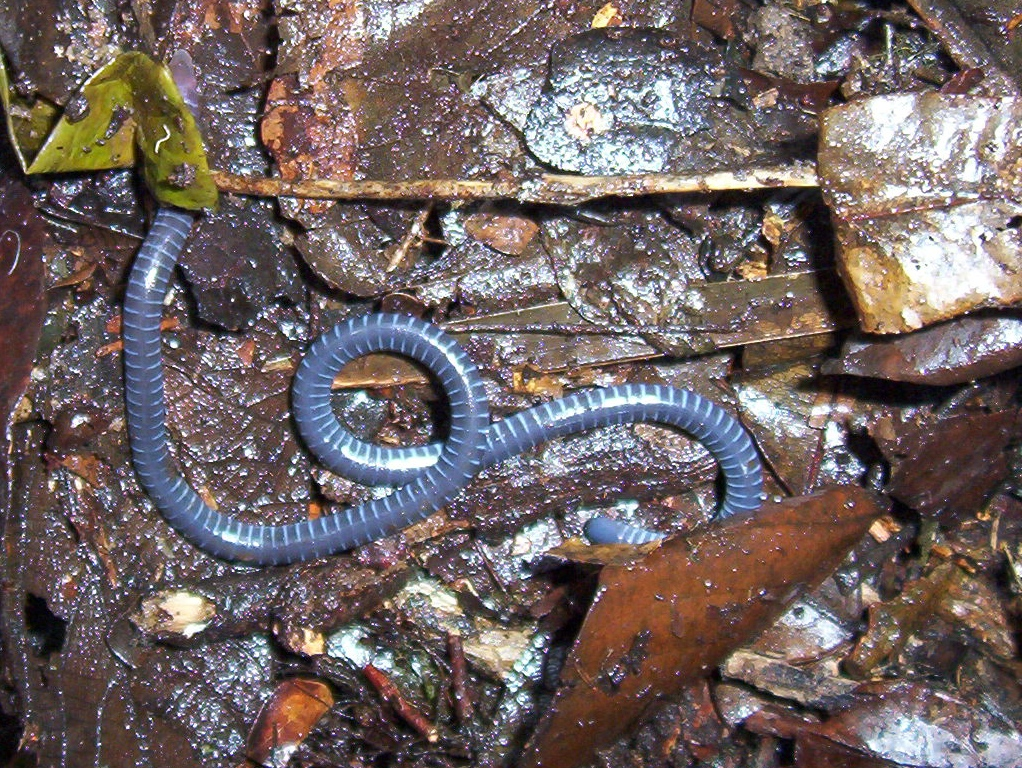

Conservation status
- Endangered (IUCN 3.1)

Scientific classification
- Kingdom: Animalia
- Phylum: Chordata
- Class: Amphibia
- Order: Gymnophiona
- Clade: Apoda
- Family: Herpelidae
- Genus: Boulengerula
- Species: B. taitana

Binomial name
- Boulengerula taitana Loveridge, 1935
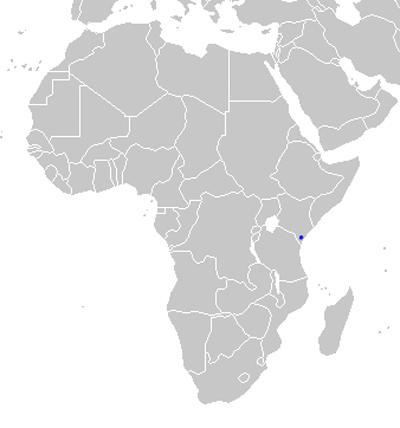
- Range highlighted in blue

Synonyms
- Boulengerula taitanus (Loveridge, 1935); Afrocaecilia taitana (Loveridge, 1935)

= Boulengerula taitana =

Species of amphibian

Boulengerula taitana (common names: Taita African caecilian, Taita Hills caecilian, Taita Mountains caecilian) is a species of caecilian. It is endemic to the Taita Hills region of southeast Kenya. Boulengerula taitana are unique caecilians in appearance, fertilization type, and parental care. From their similar shape and presentation to worms, and their internalized fertilization, they set themselves apart from many other amphibians. D. taitana interactions between mothers and newly hatched young are unique in that the mother uses her own skin as a food resource for offspring. This species also has physiological adaptations in place to increase oxygen uptake and affinity to fit their underground lifestyle. The Boulengerula taitana differentiates itself from its close relatives in ways rarely documented and researched before.

== Description ==
As stated above, B. taitana are caecilians, which are amphibians who are limbless and long in length; this amphibians' skin is divided into ring shapes, which gives the animal a similar appearance to that of an earthworm. Hatchling B. taitana are about 28 mm in length and have an inadequately ossified axial and skull skeleton in contrast to other direct-developing species. Hatchling B. taitana also have weakly-developed body musculature and external annulation, which negatively affects their mobility – essentially restricting it. When offspring are at the stage in their life where they become independent, they total about 86 mm in length.

Compared to hatchlings, adult B. taitana are typically seen as predators, exhibiting two rows of pointed teeth in the premaxillary-maxillary parts of the jaw and vomer palatine in the dentary and splenial parts of the jaw, which have one to two distinct cusps. The monocuspid teeth of the B. taitana are the three or four most anterior teeth and the vomer palatine teeth. There is then the combination of noticeable labial cusps with a lingual cusp made up of two to three supplemental cusps that make up the rest of the teeth and are multicusped. These teeth are either more pointed and elongated or are shorter and blunter.

== Habitat and distribution ==
=== Habitat ===
B. taitana are found to occupy forest environments more often than agricultural environments in east Africa. B. taitana has also been found to be longer in length when found in forest settings compared to agricultural settings – with forest-inhabiting B. taitana averaging 285.9 mm and agriculture-inhabiting B. taitana averaging 219.3 mm. B. taitana are typically found only a couple centimeters under the soil beneath rotting logs and in soil that gradually builds up around static rocks.

In this environment, B. taitana exhibit horizontal movements, which is demonstrated by them moving closer to parts of the soil that are closest to permanent water sources after the area dries out; then they move away after rainfall when the soil has become too moist. B. taitana is dependent on minimal moisture in the soil; this limits them, during drier periods, to soils near water bodies or deeper soils. In order to feed on their prey, B. taitana migrate to surface soil.

=== Geographic distribution ===
Endemic to the Taita Hills of Kenya, B. taitana is currently the only caecilian amphibian that inhabits this area. In the Taita Hills, the B. taitana are called "ming' ori", a term commonly used for earthworms. This misnomer heavily affects the false understanding of caecilians as earthworms. B. taitana is commonly found in agricultural social ecosystems or forests.

Initially, the Taita Hills were mainly forest grounds, but now the area is primarily low-intensity, small-scale agricultural units, with the majority of the area uncultivated. The climate of the area is described as having varying seasonal precipitation. Throughout the year, the rainfall is characterized as monsoonal, with April to October having wetter south-easterly monsoons and November to March having north-easterly monsoons that are drier. Furthermore, there are two distinct rainy seasons: 'masika' season from March to May with long rains and 'vuli' season from October to December with short rains.

== Conservation ==
As of 2020, B. taitana is classified as endangered according to the IUCN Red List. It tolerates low-intensity agricultural practices, but is threatened by intensification of agriculture and deforestation. The overall population is believed to be declining. The forest fragments on the Taita Hills are protected by the Kenya Forest Service, but habitat disturbance still takes place. There are some plans for habitat rehabilitation.

== Diet ==
=== Juvenile ===
Following the dentitional metamorphosis stage of development, B. taitana transitions into a generalist predator. Their diet typically consists of social macrofauna, including termites, ants, and earthworms.

=== Adult ===
As with other caecillians, Boulengerula taitana are generalist predators. Adults primarily eat termites, dipteran larvae, ants, antlions, slugs, thrips, centipedes, and earthworms. Still, it has been documented that B. taitana eat more termites and earthworms compared to the other macrofauna they typically consume. Rather than large jaw muscles and bite forces, they utilize long-axis rotations to reduce prey. Feeding events in the wild are difficult to observe due to their underground dwelling habits. Therefore, most diet studies are done on individuals above-ground laboratory conditions. The feeding process is notably slower in B. taitana compared to other terrestrial amphibian species. In B. taitana, the prey must be contacted and jaw openings modified via sensory feedback before feeding is initiated. Despite their slow feeding, their predation movements are rapid – with an average peak lunge velocity of 7.4 cm sec^{−1} and the similar jaw closure speed.

== Reproduction and life cycle ==
=== Fertilization ===
In B. taitana, fertilization takes place internally, making it a direct-developing oviparous caecilian, and the females of the species take responsibility for guarding their eggs. Cell proliferation and degeneration are functional and morphological changes of the oviducts that occur during the ovarian cycle and pregnancy to be where fertilization and early embryonic development occur.

The oviducts of B. taitana are more elongated and lie laterally to the ovaries and kidneys. The anterior part, which consists of the ostium, is located near the heart. The posterior part of the oviduct is stops at the cloaca. The oviduct is split and differentiated into three segments: anterior, middle, and posterior. Each segment comprises a serosa, mucosa, and a thin muscular layer. The folded section of the mucosal layer is sheathed in the pseudo-stratified epithelium and reinforced by the tissue of the lamina propria.

The sexual cycle is annual and is divided into three periods: preparation from September to October, ovulation from November to February, and a resting period from March to August. Between March and August, the oviduct diameter of the B. taitana varies from 120–170 μm. The epithelium, which is somewhat developed, borders a narrow lumen. At the same time, the lamina propria is narrow and contains very little blood vessels. At this point, the para recta (the anterior segment) has a limited amount of shallow crypts, and the surface epithelium contains a multitude of clusters of ciliated and secretory cells. The par utera (the posterior segment) section of the oviduct is the most folded at this time.

From September to October, the environment of the oviduct becomes more complex and more extended. At this time, the diameter of the lumen increases, the thickness of the lamina propria increases, and the epithelium are at its thickest. The pars recta secretory cells increase in size, and there are significant developments in the ciliature and secretory cells of the pars convolute (the middle segment). In the cytoplasm of ciliated cells, acidic carbohydrates are also detected.

These changes allow the oviduct of the B. taitana to be a perfect environment for ovulation and fertilization. At the end of ovulation in February, the para recta contain very few ciliated cells and a large number of glandular cells. The pars convolute contains secretory, goblet, and ciliated cells, and the par utera only has one type of glandular cell. The epithelial mucosa is more secretory at this time, and there is a greater abundance of cilia cells.

=== Brood size ===
Broods of B. taitana range from two to nine young. They have the smallest clutch sizes compared to all other caecilians. For pregnant females, smaller clutches allow them to continuously burrow within rigid substrates and feed on prey due to minimal changes of the thin body.

=== Life cycle ===
Once the tadpoles metamorphosize to become juvenile adults, they mature into adults after one year, reaching a size of 240mm or more.

== Parental care ==
=== Site selection for egg laying ===
The eggs of B. taitana are laid in terrestrial chambers constructed by females, negating development through an aquatic larval stage. Prior to or following the hatching of their eggs, B. taitana mothers typically occupy areas close to other nesting females. By doing so, females increase their own and their offspring, chances of social interactions, and the prospect of communal breeding.

=== Feeding young ===
B. taitana is an oviparous caecilian, and there is a parent-offspring transfer of nutrients after birth. B. taitana offsprings are born in an undeveloped state, thus requiring feeding and care by the parents. The dentition of offspring includes 'fetal-like' teeth, which they use to peel and eat the modified skin of their mothers after birth. The peculiar dentition of dermatophagous (skin feeding) may be the result of a pre-adaptation to fetal viviparous caecilians eating the oviduct lining of their mothers. After their birth, the young position themselves on different parts of their mother's body and repeatedly use their lower jaws to lift and peel the outer lays of the skin, which are rich in lipids. Within one week of care, juvenile B. taitana substantially increase in total length, averaging growth of about 1 mm per day. This is because the ingested skin provides a copious amount of nutrients to the offspring. At the same time, weight loss is exhibited by the mother, which is consistent with continuous feeding by their offspring, and imposes a high cost onto the mother. Researchers suggest a similarity between skin feeding and adult feeding in terms of bite forces over different gape angles.

The skin color of nurturing mothers is considerably lighter than other females and males due to the differences in composition at the cellular and tissue level. This difference is most likely due to the role of skin in nutrition for the young. The stratum corneum, the outermost layer of the epidermis, consists of flattened, keratinized cells. The cells of brooding females are lengthy and full of vesicles, and, as a result, the epidermis is double the thickness of non-brooding females. Brooding females are shown to have lower amounts of body fat and negatively impacted body conditions, with the condition of body fat and overall bodily health decreasing significantly throughout the time of caring for their young.

== Mutualism ==
=== Beneficial interspecific relationships ===
Observations of the species show that it is typical for two fathers to sire a single litter. There is also a high probability of offspring not being cared for by their biological mothers, which showcases an example of alloparenting.

== Physiology ==
=== Respiration ===
B. taitana are fossorial species, meaning their habitat consists of burrowing into moist and hard packed soil. Due to this, B. taitana often encounters hypercarbic and hypoxic conditions, which showcases that blood respiratory properties may be a result of adaptive features to its environment and behavior. Oxygen uptake levels of B. taitana are significantly higher than those of other caecilians, but they fall within the ranges of other amphibians. The O2 capacity of B. taitana is 14% volume, which is very high. Compared to other amphibians, the erythrocytes are smaller in size, their red cell count is significantly higher, and their oxygen affinity overall is higher.
