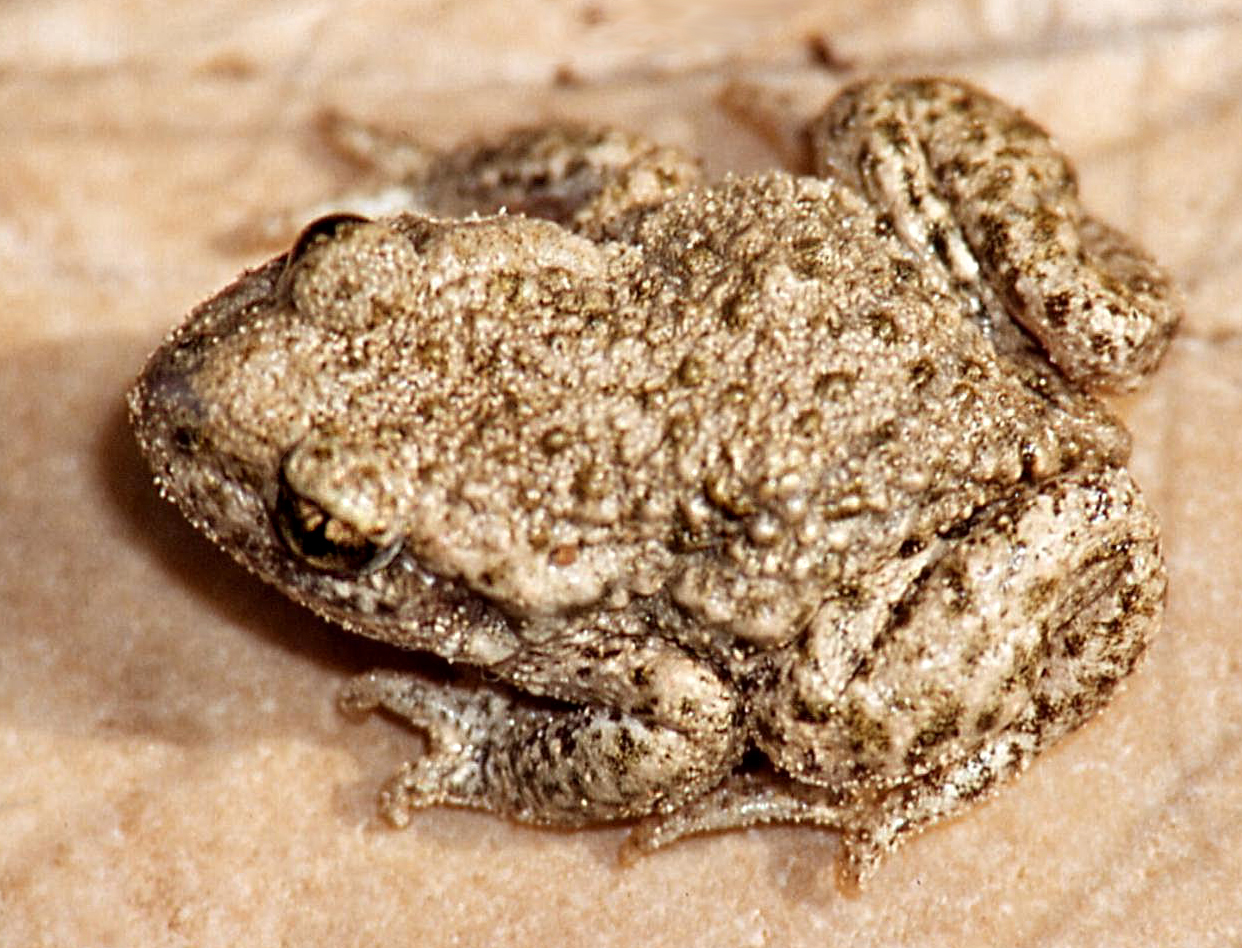

Conservation status
- Least Concern (IUCN 3.1)

Scientific classification
- Kingdom: Animalia
- Phylum: Chordata
- Class: Amphibia
- Order: Anura
- Family: Alytidae
- Genus: Alytes
- Species: A. obstetricans

Binomial name
- Alytes obstetricans (Laurenti, 1768)
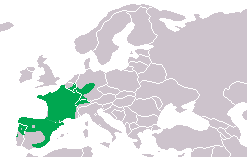

= Common midwife toad =

Species of amphibian

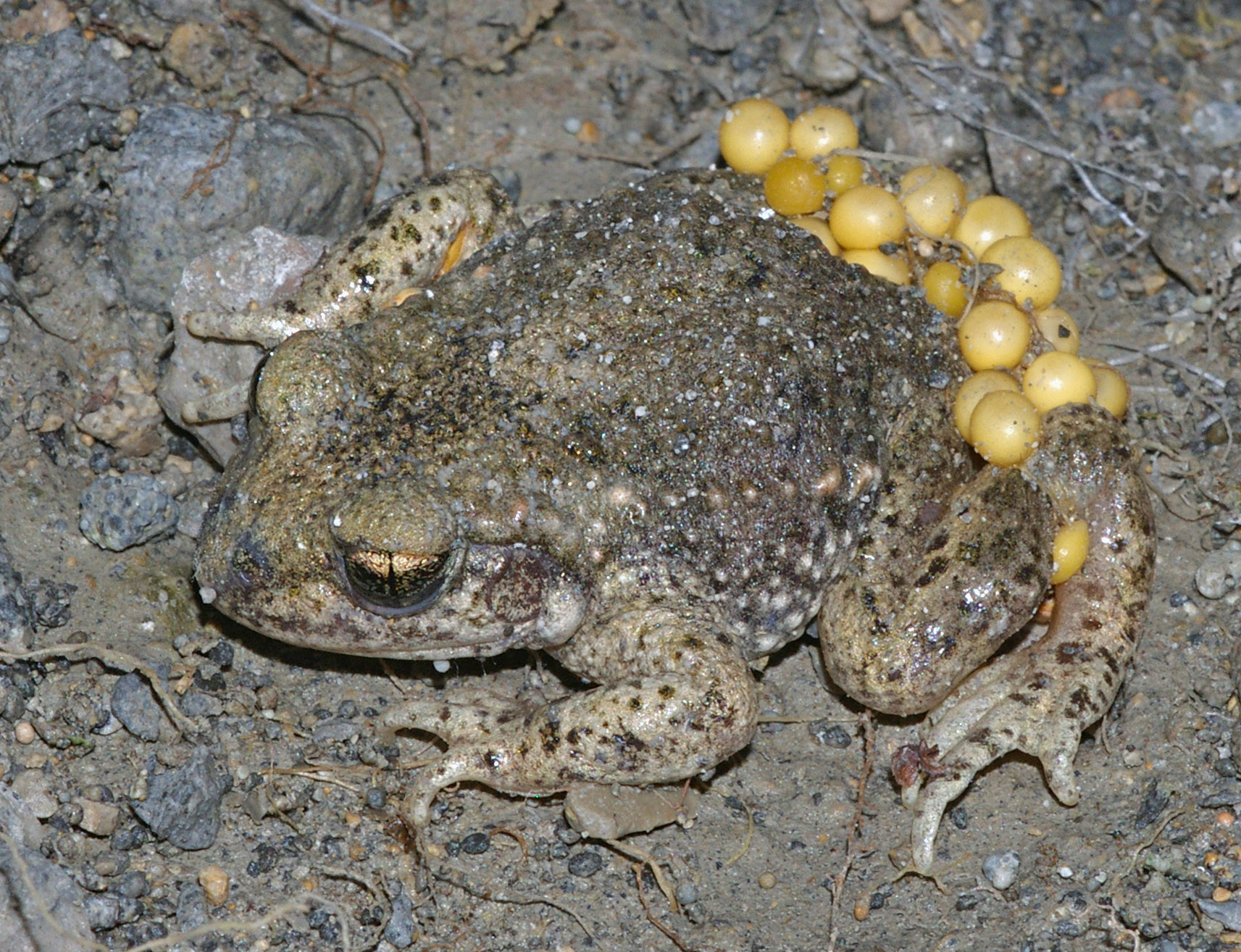
Male carrying eggs

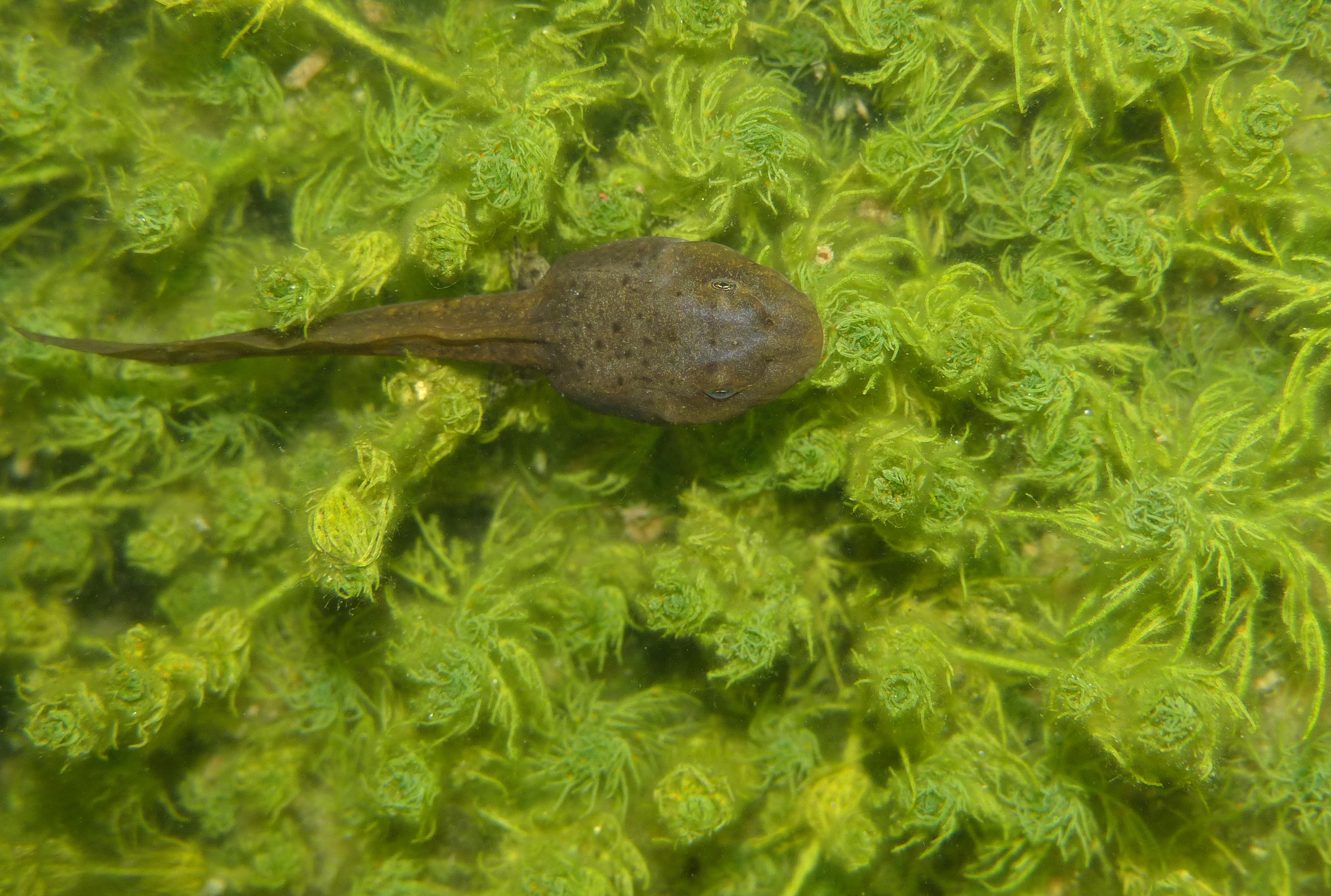
Tadpole

The common midwife toad (Alytes obstetricans) is a species of midwife frog in the family Alytidae (formerly Discoglossidae). It is found in Belgium, France, Germany, Luxembourg, the Netherlands, Portugal, Spain, Switzerland, and the United Kingdom (although, in the latter, only as an introduction). Like other members of its genus (Alytes), the male toad carries the eggs around entwined on his back and thighs until they are ready to hatch.

Its natural habitats are temperate forests, dry forests, shrubland, rivers, freshwater lakes, freshwater marshes, temperate desert, arable land, pastureland and urban areas. It is threatened by habitat loss.

== Description ==
The common midwife toad can grow to a length of 5.5 centimetres (2.2 in) but is usually rather smaller than this, the females generally being larger than the males. It is broad and stocky and has a large head with prominent eyes, the pupils being vertical slits. The skin is mostly smooth with a few small warts and granules and a row of large warts down either side. The parotoid glands are small and there are additional glands in the under arm and ankle regions. There are three tubercles on each metacarpal. The colour is quite variable, often being grey, olive or brown, sometimes speckled with small greenish or brown spots. The large warts are often reddish or yellow. The underside is pale grey often with spots of darker grey on the throat and chest.

== Distribution and habitat ==
The common midwife toad is found in a number of countries in north west Europe. It is common throughout France and is also found in southern Belgium and the Netherlands, Luxembourg, western Germany and northern and western Switzerland. There are some disconnected outlying populations in Portugal and northern Spain. In the Pyrenees it is found at altitudes of up to 2,400 metres (7,900 ft). It is usually found not far from water but sometimes wanders 500 metres (1,600 ft) away, often living in sunny locations. These include hilly areas, cultivated land, quarries, rocky slopes, gravel pits, woods, parks and gardens. It is active at dusk and through the night, spending the day hidden in undergrowth, in crevices or under logs or stones in a place where it can keep damp. It can dig a burrow with its fore limbs in which to lie and spends the winter hibernating on land. Research has demonstrated that four of the introduced populations in Bedfordshire, England have the same origin, through sequencing of 16S and COI gene sequences. However, due to limitations in the reference database, the researchers can't be sure of the exact location of origin. Researchers have noted a number of limb deformities in the introduced populations found throughout the United Kingdom, which are likely linked to small founder population sizes.

== Systematics ==
The common midwife toad, (Alytes obstetricans) has four subspecies within its distribution, A. o. almogavarii, A. o. boscai, A. o. obstetricans, and A. o. pertinax. A. o. obstetricans is the subspecies with the largest distribution, spreading from the Iberian Peninsula northward into the rest of its range. The other three subspecies are local to the Iberian Peninsula. These subspecies formed during glacial refugia conditions during the Plio-Pleistocene climatic fluctuations. Due to the genetic differences of these populations, their individual conservation is highly important. Recently, A. o. almogavarii has been recommended as an independent incipient species Alytes almogavarii as it has been shown to be moving towards total impermeable gene flow.

== Behaviour ==
Calling individual

When threatened, the midwife toad inflates, filling itself with air so as to make it appear as large as possible. It may also rear up on all four limbs, raise its rump and stand in a threatening posture with its head down and eyes shut.

Reproduction takes place in spring and summer. The female seeks out a male and invites him to mate. Females are more prone to selecting larger males due to fitness preference. He proceeds to hold her round the flanks and uses his toes to stimulate her cloaca. After about half an hour he squeezes her sides firmly, whereby she stretches her hind legs and ejects a mass of eggs embedded in strings of jelly. The male releases her and inseminates the egg mass with his sperm. A little later, he begins to pull and pummel the egg mass, teasing it out so that he can wrap the strings around his back legs. He can mate again while the eggs are twined round his limbs and can carry up to three clutches of eggs at a time, a total of about 150 eggs. He looks after them until they hatch, in 3 to 8 weeks. He keeps them moist by lying up in a damp place during the day and by going for a swim if there is risk of them drying out. He may secrete a substance through the skin that protects the eggs from infection. When the eggs are about to hatch, he detaches them in a calm stretch of water like a ditch, village pond, spring or drinking trough. There is evidence that suggests that this may include temporary water bodies, such as those found within flowerpot saucers in urban gardens. The eggs hatch into tadpoles, which feed and grow over the course of several months, develop limbs, lose their tails and eventually undergo metamorphosis into juvenile toads. They may overwinter as tadpoles, becoming exceptionally large in the process.

== Diet ==
Common midwife toads feed mostly on insects and other arthropods, as well as carrion.

== Role in history of biology, sociology of science ==
The 1971 book by Arthur Koestler The Case of the Midwife Toad, brought the species a role in new thinking on the development of scientific paradigms based on the case of Paul Kammerer who claimed to have shown Lamarckian inheritance in experiments with the toad.
