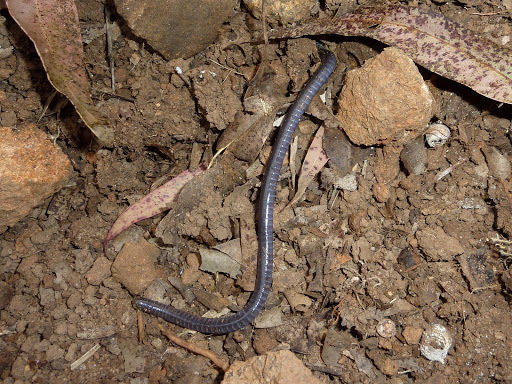
- B. niedeni in Taita–Taveta, Kenya

Conservation status
- Endangered (IUCN 3.1)

Scientific classification
- Kingdom: Animalia
- Phylum: Chordata
- Class: Amphibia
- Order: Gymnophiona
- Clade: Apoda
- Family: Herpelidae
- Genus: Boulengerula
- Species: B. niedeni

Binomial name
- Boulengerula niedeni Müller, Measey, Loader & Malonza, 2005

= Boulengerula niedeni =

Species of amphibian

Boulengerula niedeni, the Sagalla caecilian, is a worm-like amphibian first described in 2005. The species was described from a specimen discovered on Sagala Hill, an isolated mountain block of the Taita Hills in Kenya, and is not known from other areas.

Little of the original forest remains on Sagalla Hill, but the species seems to adapt to human disturbance associated with small-scale farming activities; it is not found in the eucalyptus plantations that cover much of the hill. Because of the small range of this species, it is as of 2013 listed as endangered on the IUCN Red List of Threatened Species, while previously from 2006 been listed as critically endangered. It has been listed as one of the top-10 "focal species" in 2008 by the Evolutionarily Distinct and Globally Endangered (EDGE) project.

== Description ==
The Sagalla caecilian is a caecilian, a highly unusual group of amphibians characterized by an elongated, limbless, externally segmented body, closely resembling that of a large earthworm. Depending on the micro-habitat the amphibian is found its color may vary. When found in areas with shade and high altitude they tend to be a dark brown while when found in lower elevations they tend to be a light brown with some traces of blue. Meanwhile, the bodies of juveniles only have a long, dark, narrow band on its back, and otherwise are not pigmented.

Unlike earthworms, caecilians possess a prominent mouth, nostrils, and, uniquely amongst vertebrates, a pair of retractable tentacles, one on each side of the head, between the eye and nostril. The snout of the Sagalla caecilian is rounded, with short, globular tentacles, and a relatively large mouth, with two rows of teeth in each jaw. The eyes in some are highly reduced, and, sometimes, almost entirely covered by bone and skin. The eyes may form like this due to the lack of need for vision, beyond sensing light, while digging.

== Range ==
The Sagalla caecilian can be found mainly in low density farms and patches of indigenous forests on Sagala Hill. They are limited to an altitude of 1,000–1,504 meters (3,281–4,934 ft) above sea level on Sagalla Hill as it is difficult for the species to expand to higher/lower (and therefore newer) land; they are restricted by rocky mountains with less vegetation on one side and arid climates on the other. Besides their altitude they are only found on a patch of land that has an area of 20 km^{2} (7.7 sq mi). This area is roughly half the size of Manhattan.

== Habitat ==
The forest in the Sagala Hill is ideal for Sagalla caecilian because of the large population of evergreen trees, which are a major source of food for the species. Besides the logs of these trees the Sagalla caecilian can be found in the rich soil, under organic debris, or on the edges of streams and other bodies of water. The Sagalla caecilian must be kept near water because its skin requires it to be moist at all times. Also, it can find its prey in the moist soil and stay hidden from predators. Unlike other worms, the Sagalla caecilian does not need the moisture to help with reproduction. The forest and the farms must be at an altitude of 1,000–1,500 meters (3,300–4,900 ft) above sea level for the worm to survive. This altitude is preferred because the temperatures are cooler and the Sagalla caecilian will not be dehydrated when on the decomposing litter on the surface.

== Threats ==
This species is significantly confined to a certain location as well as being restricted in distribution. The region which it is found in Kenya, Sagalla Hill, suffers from a declining size and quality of the habitat. Furthermore, as a result of the development of eucalyptus plantations in the area, the soil is dry and compact making it unsuitable for the survival of the Sagalla caecillian. The smooth bark eucalyptus are more of a threat because they tend to extract more water from the soil than the rough barked ones. Another factor that threatens the species is deforestation for the expansion of farming land area. Due to lack of vegetation especially along the streams, there is less protection against flooding and erosion; hence, the caecillian species are made vulnerable.

== Conservation ==
Since the Sagalla caecilian is a recently discovered species, much is still unknown. However, it is not known to appear in any protected areas, like national parks or conservations. This particular species is seen as an indicator for rich soil, so efforts have been made in order to improve the quality of the land. While Boulengerula niedeni has not been targeted specifically through conservation initiatives, the attempts to better the soil are often coupled with studies of amphibian diversity. In addition, a competition was organised for the people of the small Sagalla community to find a new name for the Sagalla caecilian in the local dialect, kisagalla. Conservationists had done this in order to make the species more relatable to the local people. Patrick Malonza of the National Museums of Kenya (co-describer of this species and one of the organizers of the competition) explained the importance of naming the species locally:

"If the animal has a local kisagalla name, we think that Sagalla people may recognize it for the special endemic species that it is. They have something unique to be proud of."

The Zoological Society of London's "EDGE (Evolutionarily Distinct & Globally Endangered) of Existence" campaign has begun working to establish a caecilian preserve and restore habitat for the species. Since Sagalla Hill is considered a biodiversity hotspot, many other organizations also have stakes in the area. However, little is being done specifically for the Sagalla caecilian. Some priorities for the Sagalla caecilian's conservation include: stabilizing the soil by restoring vegetation and improving agricultural practices, careful replacement of eucalyptus plantations with indigenous trees, working with local communities, and continuing to study the caecilian's ecology. Work is being done in order to train field assistants on how to properly implement these changes.
