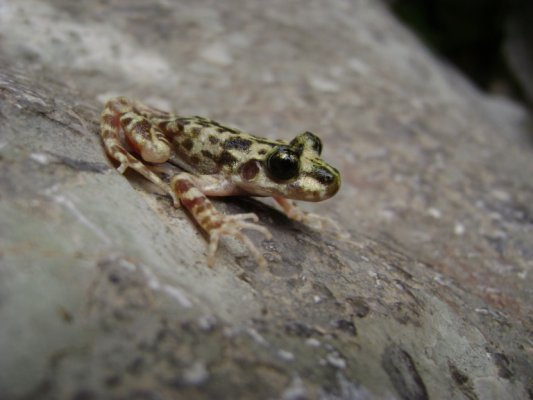

Conservation status
- Endangered (IUCN 3.1)

Scientific classification
- Kingdom: Animalia
- Phylum: Chordata
- Class: Amphibia
- Order: Anura
- Family: Alytidae
- Genus: Alytes
- Species: A. muletensis

Binomial name
- Alytes muletensis (Sanchiz & Adrover, 1977)
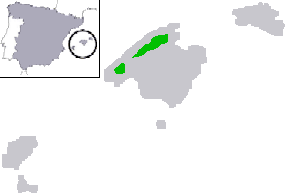

= Majorcan midwife toad =

Species of amphibian

The Majorcan midwife toad (Alytes muletensis) (also Mallorcan midwife toad or ferreret in Balearic Catalan and Spanish) is a frog in the family Alytidae (formerly Discoglossidae). It is endemic to the Balearic Island of Mallorca in the Mediterranean Sea. An example of Lazarus taxon, the species was first described from fossil remains in 1977, but living animals were discovered in 1979.

The species, considered "endangered" by the International Union for Conservation of Nature (IUCN), is currently restricted to isolated mountain streams in the island's Serra de Tramuntana and has an estimated population of 500 to 1500 breeding pairs in the wild. It does exist and reproduce easily in captivity, however. The Majorcan midwife toad is thought to have disappeared from most of the island as a result of the introduction of competitors and predators from the mainland in ancient times. Reintroduction of the species in additional areas has taken place since 1988, with many new breeding populations now well established.

== Characteristics ==
Like all midwife toads, the male of the species always carries the developing eggs during the months of May and June. Generally the head and legs are large in comparison to the rest of the body. Unusually, the female of the species competes for the male, even grappling against other individuals in order to secure a mate. Both male and female frogs use a series of noises in order to attract a mate during courtship. Comparatively the female is larger than the male (Male: 34.7 mm, Female: 38 mm).

== Distribution ==
The species is endemic to Mallorca, and is found only in the mountainous regions and gorges of the Serra de Tramuntana. In this area, the species inhabits streams in limestone caverns, where they hide under boulders and stones.

== Status ==
The Majorcan midwife toad was first discovered in 1977 and was described as Baleaphryne muletensis. Only later the toad was accounted as a midwife toad. This was due to the fact that the species was thought extinct and was described from the fossil record. Later the species was 'rediscovered' in 1979 when froglets and young frogs were discovered. Currently the species is protected as a Mallorcan endemic species, and breeding programs have been started to prevent the extinction of this species. The number of wild animals is estimated at 300 to 700 breeding pairs. It was previously housed and bred at the Durrell Wildlife Park, with the goal of releasing into the wild, which was successful.

== Threats ==
=== Invasive species and predation ===
The viperine snake (Natrix maura) is an invasive species on Mallorca introduced via human activity or from individuals swimming to Mallorca from mainland Europe, though it has likely been present on the island for at least several centuries. This snake eats both the tadpoles and adults of A. muletensis, and has led to a decline of up to 90% in some midwife toad tadpole populations. Another species introduced to Mallorca in antiquity (~2,000 years ago) is the Perez's frog (Rana perezi), which also eats both tadpoles and adult midwife toads and competes with the toad for resources.

=== Human activities and habitat alteration ===
The midwife toad lives exclusively in the streams of limestone ravines in the Serra de Tramuntana on the northwestern side of Mallorca. Any human alterations (i.e., dams, canals) which change water levels or quality of these streams affect the toad's ability to find suitable habitat. Human recreational activities in the toad's habitat (e.g., hiking) could also introduce diseases to Mallorcan midwife toad populations.

=== Disease introduction and lack of habitat maintenance ===
In 1991, a highly-contagious fungal disease, chytridiomycosis, was introduced to the population via reintroduction of captive-bred individuals that had been in contact with infected captive Cape platanna (Xenopus gilli) individuals. The fungus which causes this disease, Batrachochytrium dendrobatidis, declined after 2008, and as of 2015, B. dendrobatidis was reported to be extirpated from the island following aggressive treatment of infected ponds with itraconazole fungicide. Several new habitat sites have been constructed for the midwife toad, although these are reportedly poorly maintained, and subpopulations reported in these new habitats are unlikely to survive long-term without intervention.
