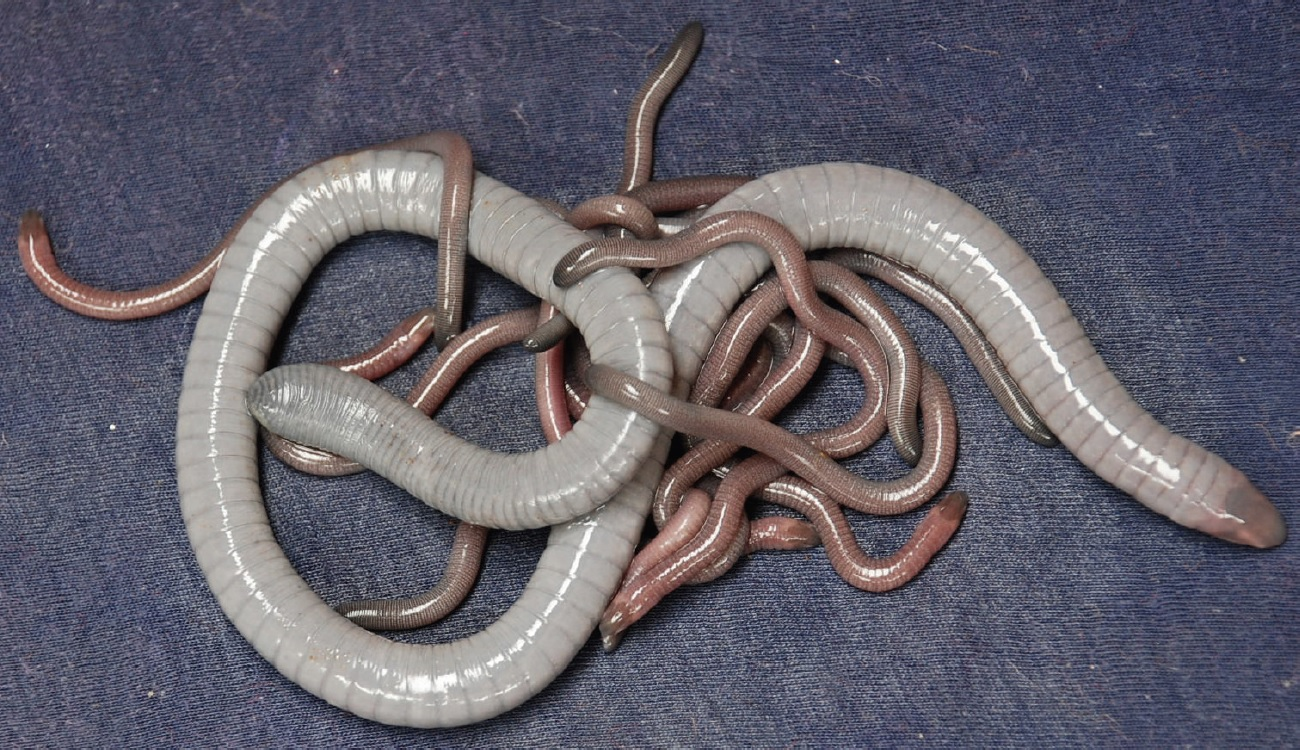
- Herpele squalostoma, female with her young

Scientific classification
- Kingdom: Animalia
- Phylum: Chordata
- Class: Amphibia
- Order: Gymnophiona
- Clade: Apoda
- Family: Herpelidae
- Genus: Herpele; Peters, 1880

Type species
- Caecilia squalostoma Stutchbury, 1834

Species
- See text

= Herpele =

Genus of amphibians

Herpele is a genus of caecilians in the family Herpelidae. They are endemic to Central and Western Africa (from southeastern Nigeria east to western Central African Republic and south to western Democratic Republic of the Congo, possibly to Angola).

At least Herpele squalostoma is probably oviparous and provides parental care: the young feed on their mother's skin (they are "dermatophagous").

== Species ==
There are two recognized species:

Binomial name and authority	Common name
Herpele multiplicata Nieden, 1912	Victoria caecilian
Herpele squalostoma (Stutchbury, 1836)	Congo caecilian
