= Boulengerula denhardti =

Conservation status
- Critically Endangered (IUCN 3.1)

Scientific classification
- Kingdom: Animalia
- Phylum: Chordata
- Class: Amphibia
- Order: Gymnophiona
- Clade: Apoda
- Family: Herpelidae
- Genus: Boulengerula
- Species: B. denhardti

Binomial name
- Boulengerula denhardti Nieden, 1912

Species of amphibian

Boulengerula denhardti, commonly known as Denhardt's African caecilian, is a species of amphibian in the family Herpelidae. It is endemic to Kenya. It is only known from its type locality, the Tana River valley, as well as from the Ngaia Forest, Meru County. It is named for German explorer brothers Clemens Denhardt and Gustav Denhardt who explored the area where it was discovered. Its natural habitats are subtropical or tropical moist lowland forests and heavily degraded former forest. It is threatened by habitat loss, expanding agriculture, use of herbicides and pesticides and expanding human settlements.
