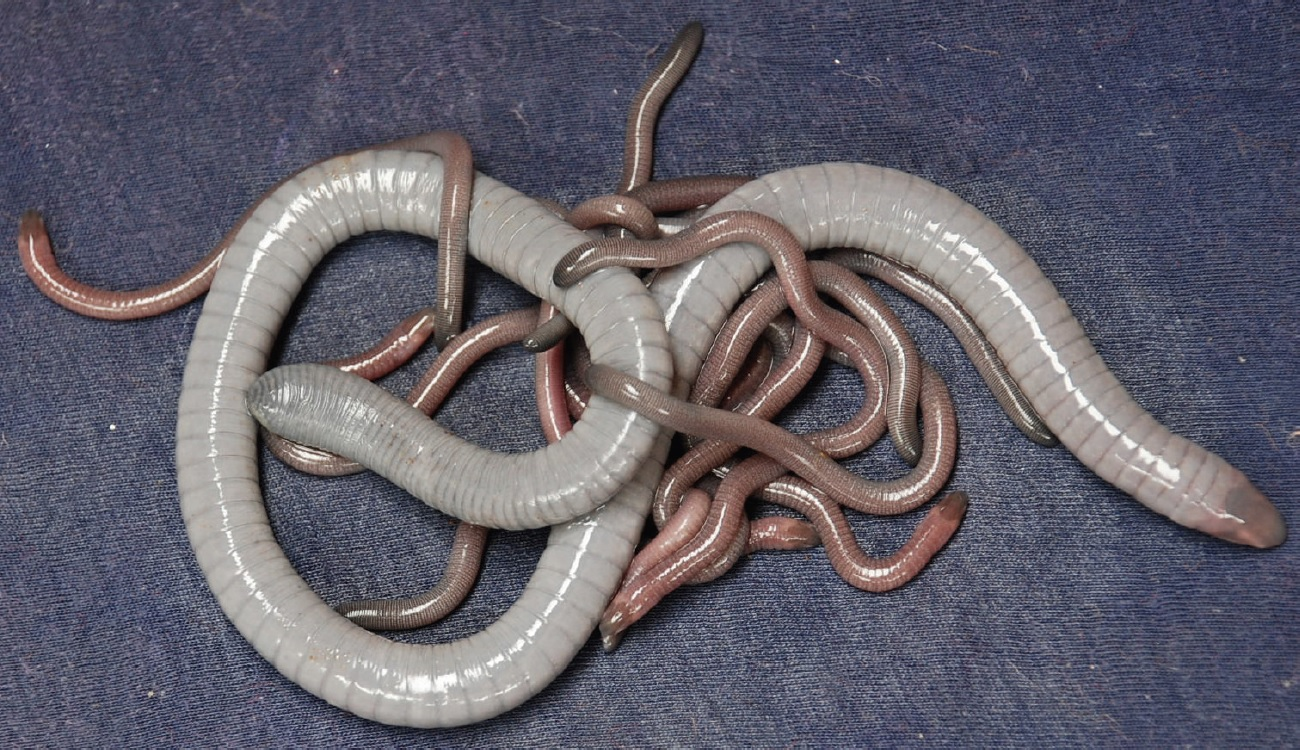
- Female (36 cm (14 in) long) with young

Conservation status
- Least Concern (IUCN 3.1)

Scientific classification
- Kingdom: Animalia
- Phylum: Chordata
- Class: Amphibia
- Order: Gymnophiona
- Clade: Apoda
- Family: Herpelidae
- Genus: Herpele
- Species: H. squalostoma

Binomial name
- Herpele squalostoma (Stuchbury, 1836)

Synonyms
- Caecilia squalostoma Stutchbury, 1836

= Herpele squalostoma =

Species of amphibian

Herpele squalostoma is a species of caecilian in the family Herpelidae. It is also known by the common name Congo caecilian. It is found in Central and extreme easternmost West Africa (southeastern Nigeria, Cameroon, western Central African Republic, Equatorial Guinea (including Bioko), Gabon, Republic of the Congo, western Democratic Republic of the Congo, and possibly the Cabinda Province of Angola).

== Description ==
The holotype measures 41 cm (16 in). The body is cylindrical and 6–8 mm (0.2–0.3 in) wide. The snout is prominent. The eyes are covered with bone and not visible externally. There are fewer than 135 primary annuli (116–132 in a sample of 112 specimens) and 12–16 secondary annuli that do not reach round the body. In preservative, the body is dark olive in colour and is marked with minute yellowish spots.

== Reproduction ==
A female measuring 36 cm (14 in) in total length has been unearthened with a clutch of 16 young in moist soil some 0.1 m (4 in) below the surface. The young measured about 11–12 cm (4–5 in) in total length. The largest known eggs of this species measure 3.5 mm × 2.6 mm (0.14 in × 0.10 in). As other herpelids, Herpele squalostoma is probably oviparous.

H. squalostoma mothers provide parental care over their offspring, developing an outer layer of skin for maternal dermatophagy to provide offspring with nutrients and vertically transmit their microbiome. Their offspring become independent when they grow to a size of 10–12 cm (4–5 in).

== Habitat and conservation ==
Herpele squalostoma occurs in lowland forest, and it can also occur in fruit tree plantations, rural gardens and secondary forest. Its upper elevational limit is not well known but in Cameroon it is found at least to 800 m (2,600 ft) above sea level. It is presumably largely fossorial.

Herpele squalostoma occurs in small numbers in the international pet trade, but it is not known whether this could be a threat. Batrachochytrium dendrobatidis has been detected in this species, and thus chytridiomycosis is a potential threat. Herpele squalostoma is found in many protected areas, including the Korup National Park in Cameroon and the Moukalaba-Doudou National Park in Gabon.
