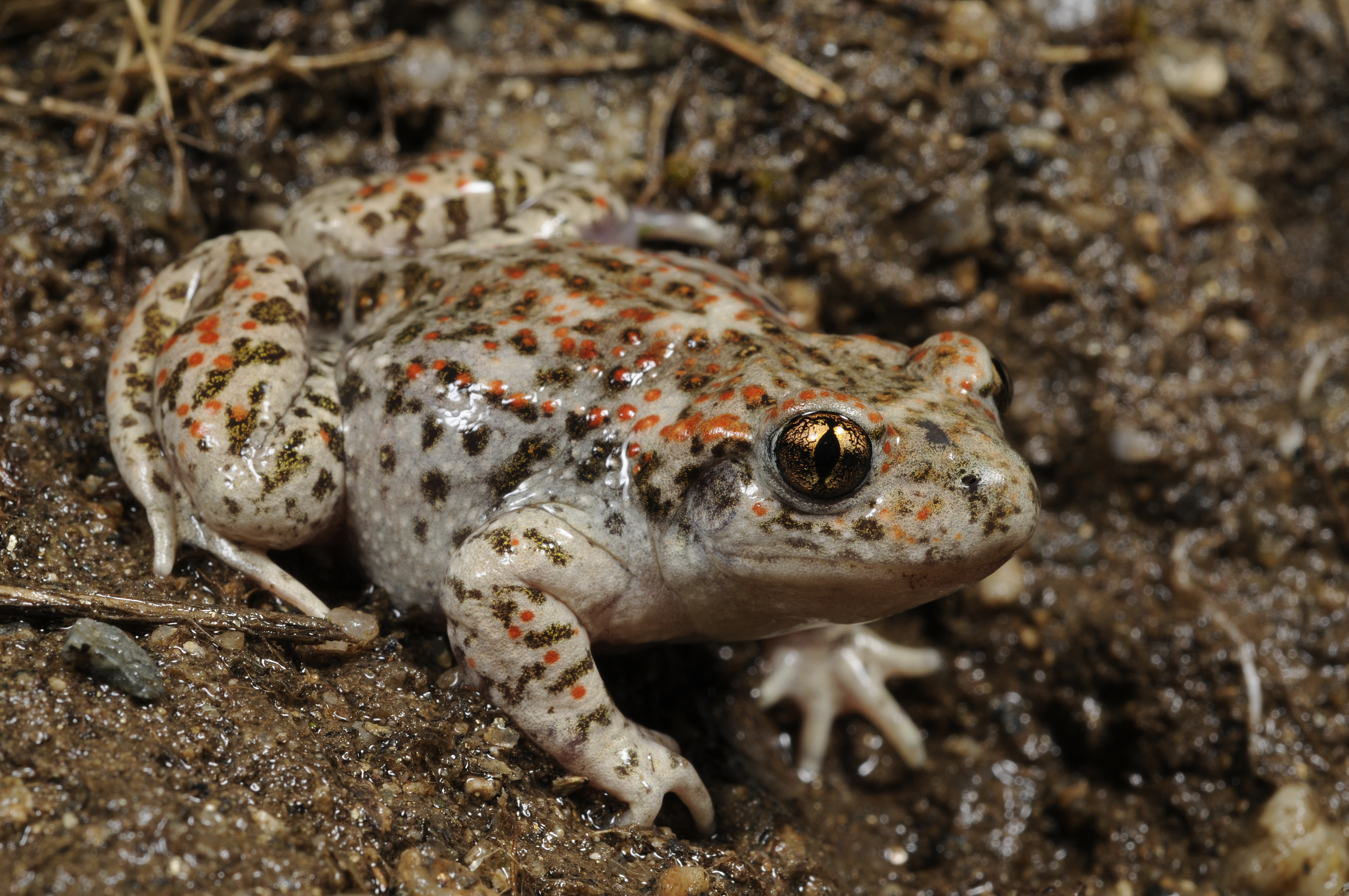

Conservation status
- Least Concern (IUCN 3.1)

Scientific classification
- Kingdom: Animalia
- Phylum: Chordata
- Class: Amphibia
- Order: Anura
- Family: Alytidae
- Genus: Alytes
- Species: A. cisternasii

Binomial name
- Alytes cisternasii Boscá, 1879
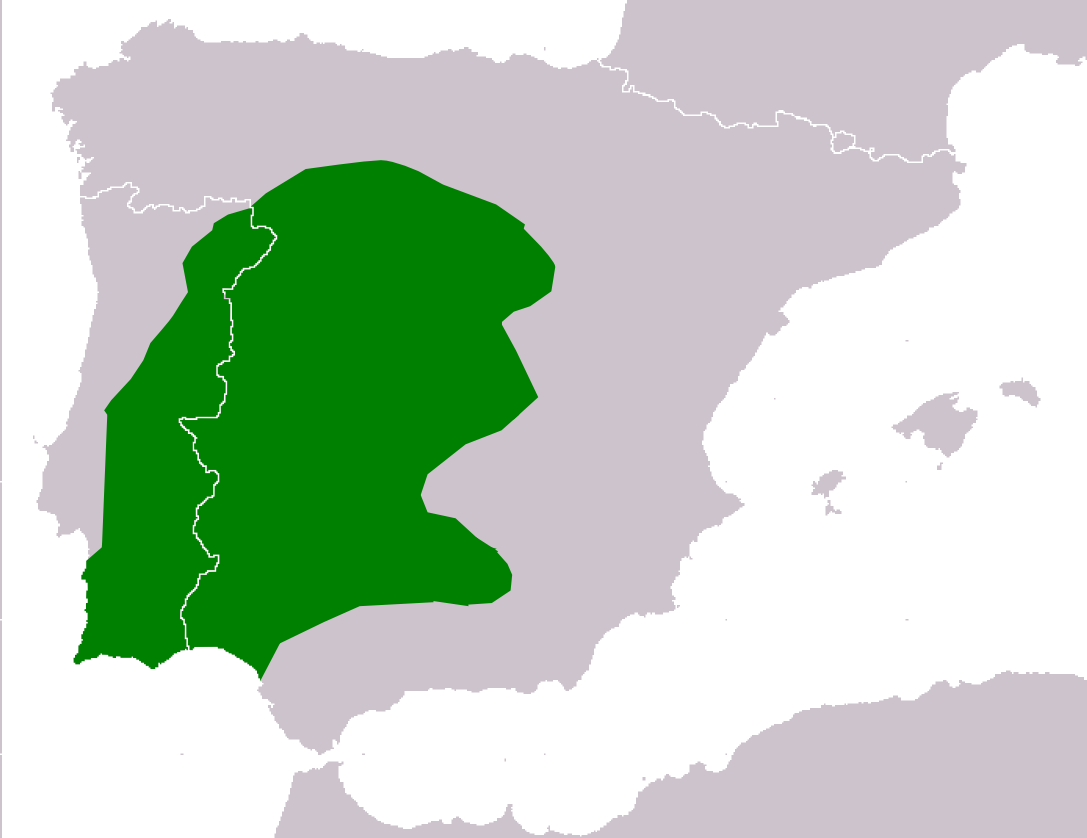

Synonyms
- Ammoryctis cisternasii — Lataste, 1879

= Iberian midwife toad =

Species of frog

The Iberian midwife toad or brown midwife toad (Alytes cisternasii), in Portuguese sapo-parteiro-ibérico, is a species of frog in the family Alytidae (formerly Discoglossidae) found in Portugal and western Spain. It is typically found in open habitats such as meadows and open oak forests. Habitat loss is one of the threats to its survival.

== Description ==
The Iberian midwife toad grows to a length of about 40 mm (1.6 in), males being rather smaller than females. The snout is rounded and the eyes large, with vertical slit pupils. Tiny, often orange, warts occur on the upper eyelids. The parotoid glands are relatively small and the tympani are distinct. Many tubercles are seen on the body and concentrations of glandular warts are under the arms, in the groin area, and on the ankles. The limbs are fairly short. The colour of the upper surface is brownish-grey with dark spots, and the warts are often reddish. The underparts are unspotted and greyish-white.

== Distribution and habitat ==
This toad is native to Portugal and western Spain at altitudes up to 1,300 m (4,300 ft) above sea level. Its preferred habitat is Mediterranean-type scrub, rough grazing, and light oak woodland.

== Biology ==
Mating takes place in the autumn and the eggs are laid on land. The male then gathers up the egg mass and wraps it round his legs, carrying it around until the developing embryos are ready to hatch. He can carry as many as 180 eggs resulting from four clutches laid by different females. The male deposits the hatching tadpoles in suitable water bodies where they continue their development. Metamorphosis occurs about four months later when the tadpoles measure about 70 mm (2.8 in) in length.

== Status ==
The main threats it faces are the degradation of suitable terrestrial habitat, pollution, loss of suitable breeding pools, and the introduction of the invasive crayfish Procambarus clarkii and non-native fishes that prey on the tadpoles. It is also threatened by the infectious fungal disease chytridiomycosis.
