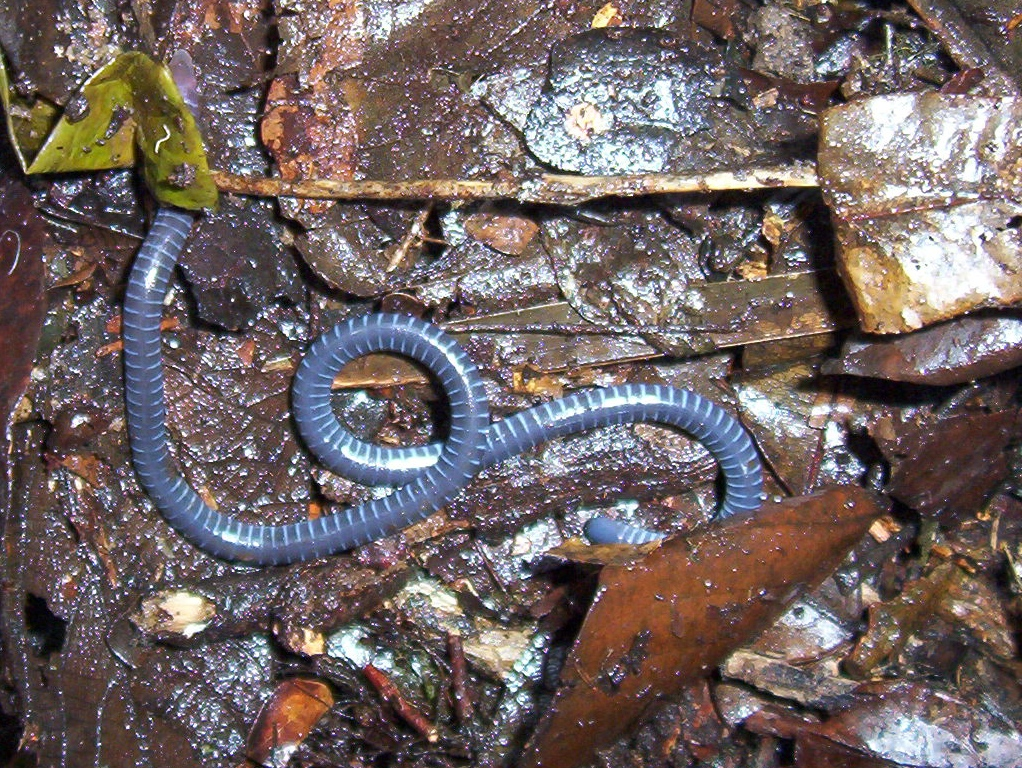
- Boulengerula taitanus

Scientific classification
- Kingdom: Animalia
- Phylum: Chordata
- Class: Amphibia
- Order: Gymnophiona
- Clade: Apoda
- Family: Herpelidae
- Genus: Boulengerula; Tornier, 1896

Species
- 8 species (see text)

Synonyms
- Afrocaecilia Taylor, 1968

= Boulengerula =

Genus of amphibians

Boulengerula is a genus of amphibians in the family Herpelidae. They are found in East Africa. They are sometimes known as Boulenger's caecilians or Usambara bluish-gray caecilians.

== Ecology ==
Boulengerula taitana feeds on earthworms, termites, dipteran larvae and other soil macrofauna. Presumably other Boulengerula have similar diets.

== Species ==
There are eight species:

== Morphology ==
A study described a new species, Boulengerula spawlsi found in the Ngaia Forest Reserve in Kenya. The species is distinguished by anteriorly positioned tentacular apertures and tentacular grooves that are partially or fully covered by the maxillopalatines, traits not seen in other Boulengerula species. Additional differences in skull morphology were also noticed.

Binomial name and author	Common name
Boulengerula boulengeri Tornier, 1896	Boulenger's caecilian, Usambara bluish-gray caecilian
Boulengerula changamwensis Loveridge, 1932	Changamwensis African caecilian, Changamwe lowland caecilian, Changamwe caecilian
Boulengerula denhardti Nieden, 1912
Boulengerula fischeri Nussbaum & Hinkel, 1994
Boulengerula niedeni Müller, Measey, Loader, & Malonza, 2005
Boulengerula spawlsi Wilkinson, Malonza, Campbell, and Loader, 2017	Spawls' boolee
Boulengerula taitana Loveridge, 1935	Taita African caecilian, Taita Mountains caecilian
Boulengerula uluguruensis Barbour & Loveridge, 1928	Uluguru African caecilian, Uluguru pink caecilian
