= Manyoni Private Game Reserve =

Protected area in north-eastern KwaZulu-Natal, South Africa

- Interactive map of Manyoni Private Game Reserve
- Location: KwaZulu-Natal, South Africa
- Nearest city: eMkhuze
- Coordinates: 27°39′S 32°01′E
- Area: 230 km^{2} (89 sq mi)
- Established: 2004; 22 years ago
- Website: www.manyoni.co.za

Previously known as Zululand Rhino Reserve, Manyoni Private Game Reserve is a "big five" protected area in north-eastern KwaZulu-Natal, South Africa. It covers an area of 230 km² (89 sq mi) within the Mkuze Valley Lowveld vegetation type.

== History ==
The reserve was formed in 2004 from a partnership of the WWF, Ezemvelo KZN Wildlife and 17 private landowners as part of the WWF Black Rhino Range Expansion Project as a release site with the founding population of Black rhinoceros released in 2005. The area was made a Nature Reserve in 2009.

In 2015, due to several instances of rhinoceros poaching despite large investments in security, Manyoni decided to dehorn its entire rhinoceros population in order to disincentivise poaching. This project was completed and all horns moved off the reserve. The Rhino Management Project continues today and is partially funded by guests participating in or observing dehorning operations.

== Geography ==
Manyoni Private Game Reserve is one of the largest private reserves in KwaZulu-Natal comprising 230 km² (89 sq mi). The topography is varied with grassland, rocky hills, savannah thornveld and riverine forest habitats all being found within the reserve.

== Wildlife ==
Over 70 mammal species occur within the reserve including African buffalo, African bush elephant, Southern white rhinoceros, Black rhinoceros, Lion, Leopard, Giraffe, Zebra, Hyena, Blue wildebeest and Kudu amongst others. 434 bird species have been recorded at the reserve. It is a SANBI Biodiversity Stewardship Reserve.

== Gallery ==
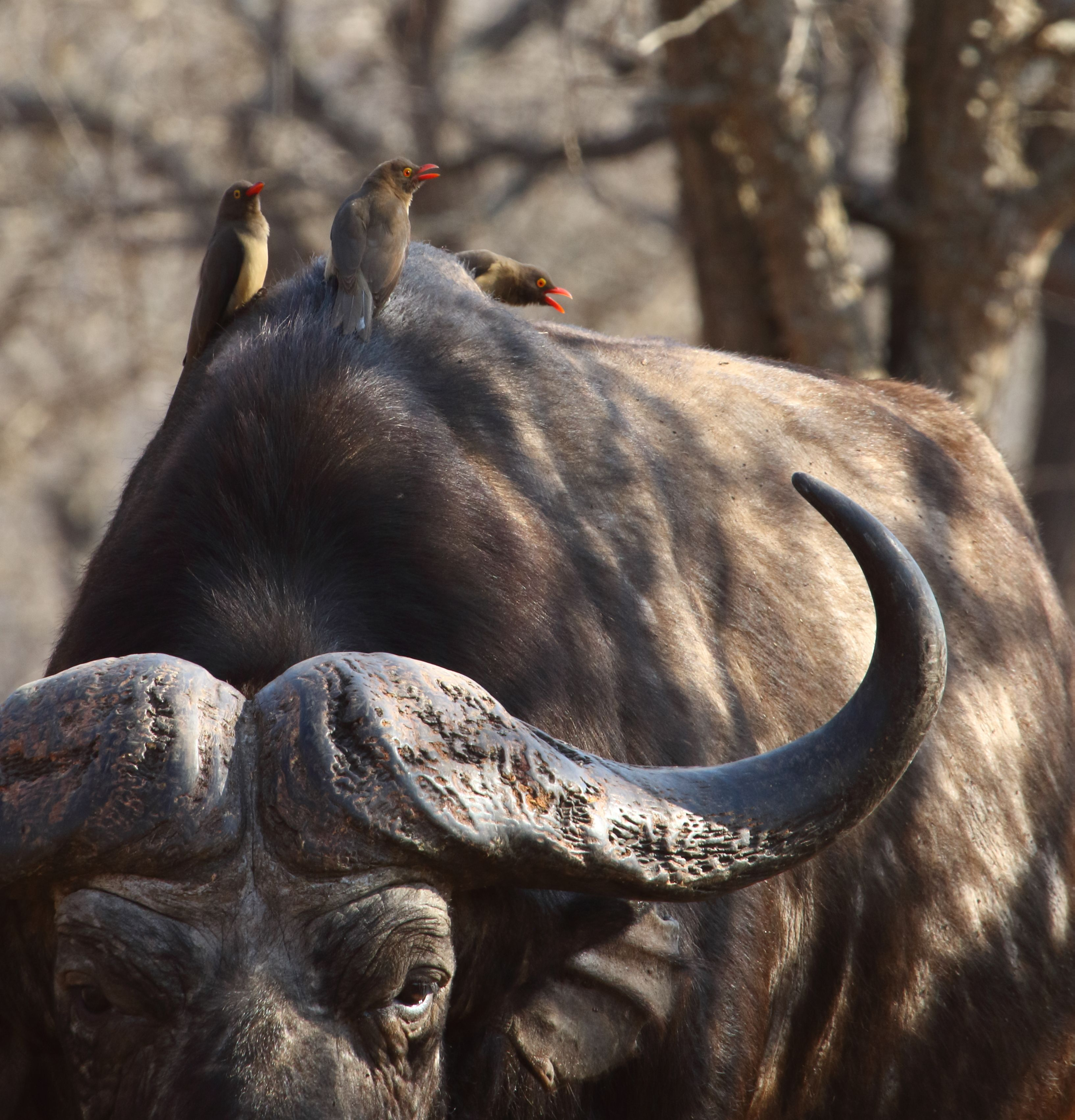
Oxpeckers perched on cape buffalo

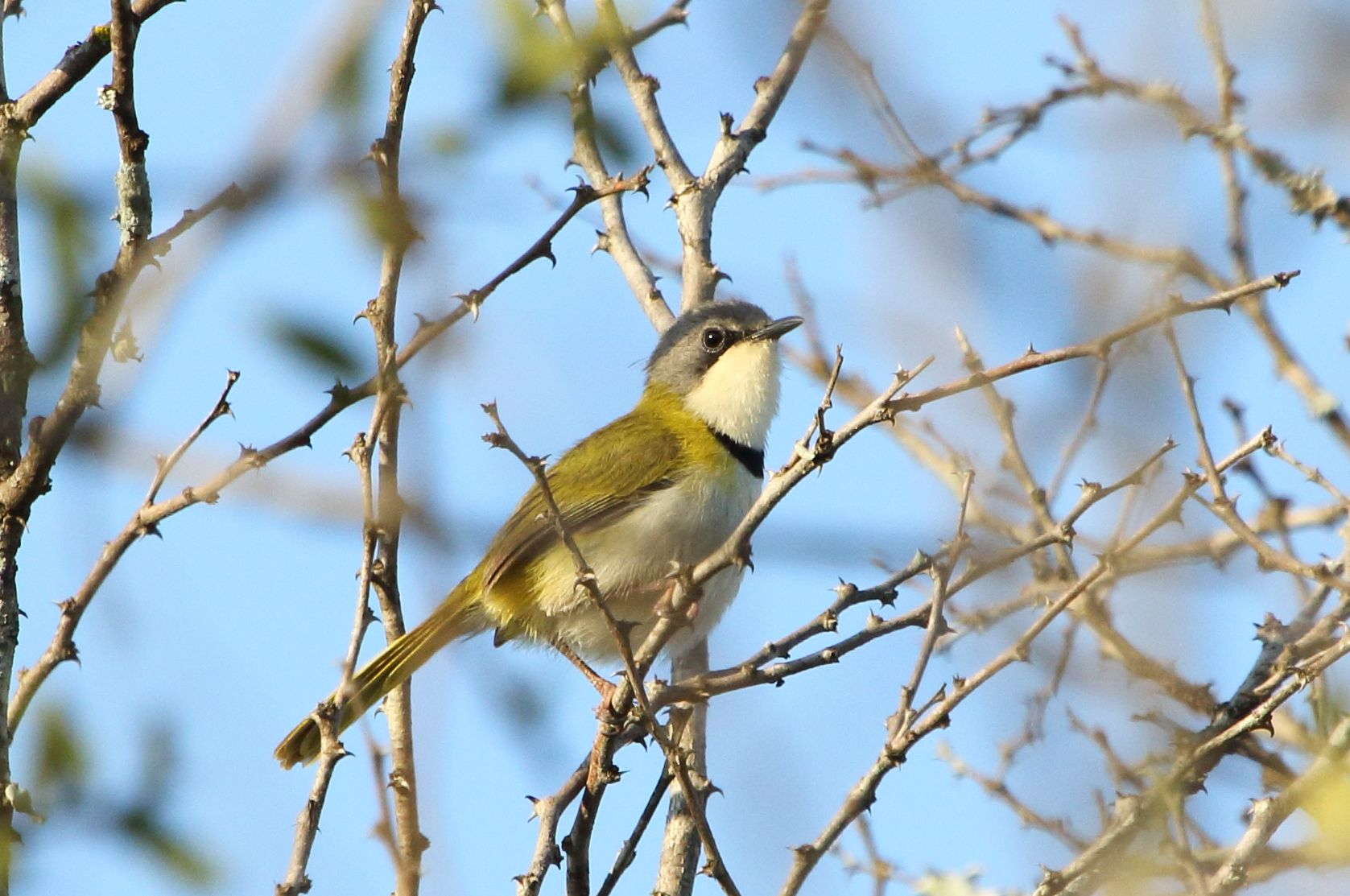
Rudd's apalis, a localized endemic

Scarabaeus and Garreta dung beetle fauna on bush elephant dung

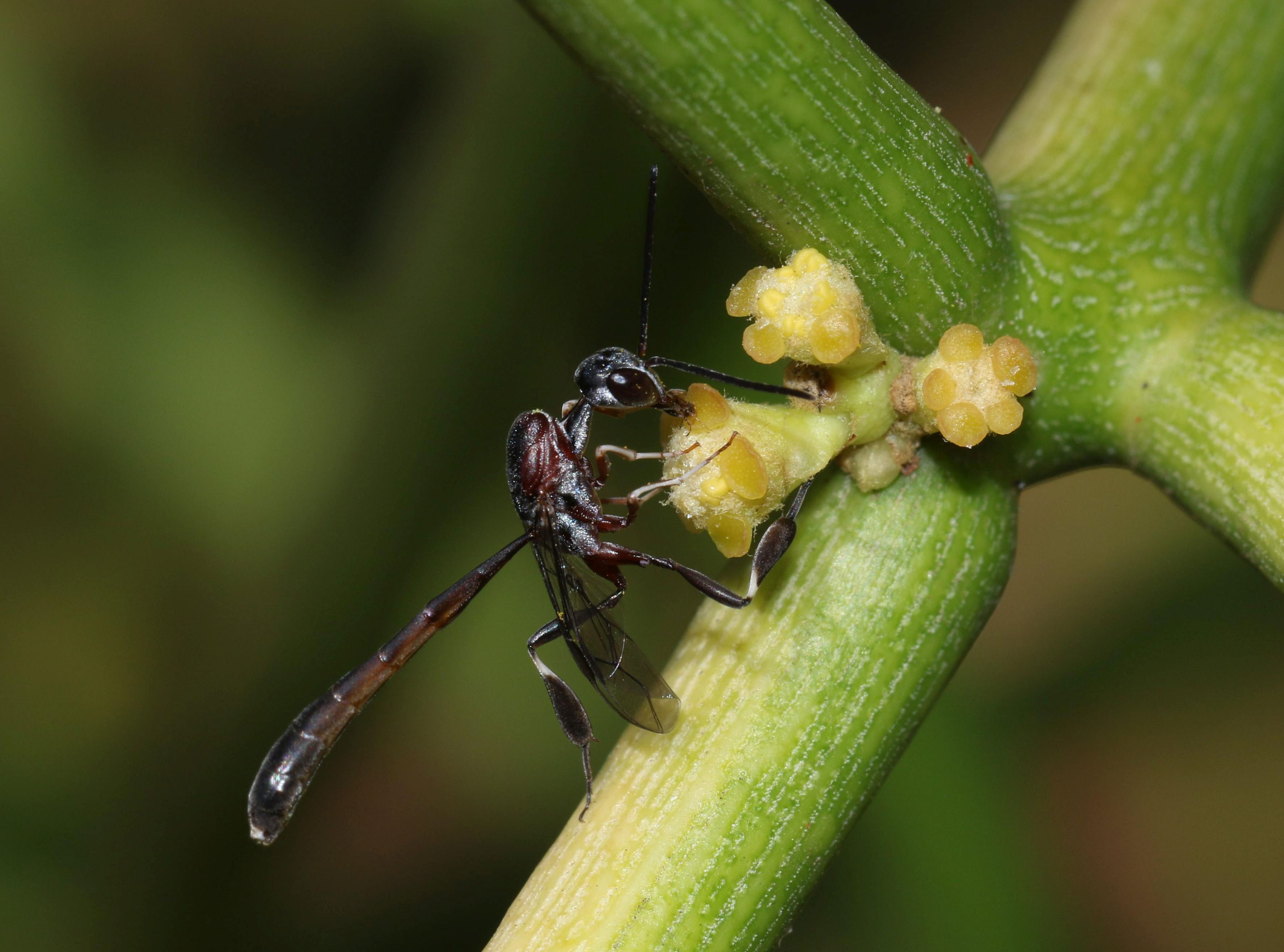
Male carrot wasp (Gasteruption sp.) on flowering pencil euphorbia
