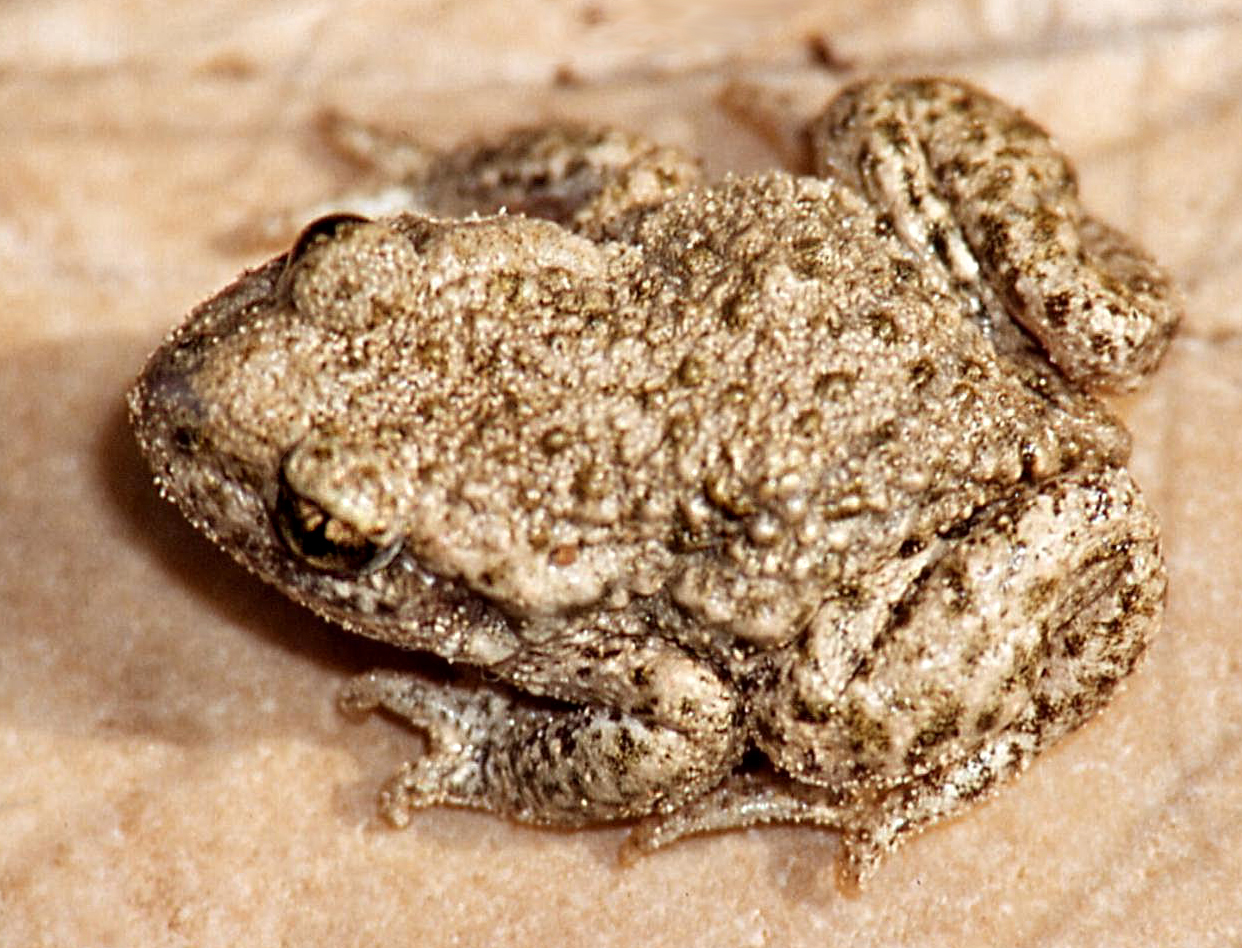
- Alytes obstetricans

Scientific classification
- Kingdom: Animalia
- Phylum: Chordata
- Class: Amphibia
- Order: Anura
- Family: Alytidae
- Genus: Alytes; Wagler, 1830

Species
- Alytes cisternasii Boscá, 1879. Alytes dickhilleni Arntzen et García-París, 1995. Alytes maurus Pasteur et Bons, 1962. Alytes muletensis (Sanchíz et Adrover, 1979). Alytes obstetricans (Laurenti, 1768).

= Midwife toad =

Midwife toad Temporal range: 3.6 –0 Ma Pliocene – present

Genus of amphibians

Midwife toads are a genus (Alytes) of frogs in the family Alytidae (formerly Discoglossidae), and are found in most of Continental Europe and Northwestern Africa. It has also been introduced to Great Britain. Characteristic of these toad-like frogs is their parental care; the males carry a string of fertilised eggs on their backs, hence the name "midwife". The female expels a strand of eggs, which the male fertilizes externally. He then wraps them around his legs to protect them from predators in the water. When they are ready to hatch, the male wades into shallow water, where he allows the tadpoles to leap out of their eggs. Five separate species of midwife toads are found across western Europe, northern Africa, and Mallorca.

Midwife toads can be found in the snows of the Pyrenees, living at heights of 5,000–6,500 feet in areas such as the Néouvielle Massif. Unlike the thin tongue of many amphibians, the midwife's tongue is round and flattened; its former family name, Discoglossidae, means "round tongue". In parts of France, midwife toads live in sand dunes by the sea. They share this habitat with natterjack toads.

== Description ==
Five separate species of midwife toads are found across western Europe, northern Africa, and Mallorca. Shy, nocturnal animals, they give away their presence by their ringing call. During the day, midwife toads hide under stones and logs or in tunnels, often in dry, sandy soil, which is easier to dig into using their forelegs and snouts. They emerge at dusk to forage for food, but always returns to the same hiding places before dawn. During the winter, they hibernate in a hole or burrow that has been deserted by a small animal.

=== Food and feeding ===
The midwife toad crawls around the area close to its hiding place at night to search for food. The toad uses the end of its long, sticky tongue to pick up prey, including beetles, crickets, flies, caterpillars, centipedes, ants, and millipedes. Tadpoles feed on vegetable matter. They chew with tiny, horny teeth. Young toads eat smaller sizes of the same prey on which adults feed.

== Defences ==
The back of the midwife toad is covered with small warts. These warts give off an odorous poison when the toad is handled or attacked. The poison is so powerful that the toad has few enemies or predators. The poison also helps to keep the egg strings on the male's back safe from attack. The tadpole does not possess the poison, so it falls prey to fish and insects.

=== Adaptations ===
The Majorcan midwife toad has adapted to the harsh, dry conditions of this Spanish island. It is found only in deep canyons in the northern mountains. It has evolved to have a flatter body, which enables the toad to squeeze into narrow crevices in the rocks of its habitat. The only moisture available is in small, rain-filled puddles on ledges. Tadpoles are born and develop in these pools. Fossils of these species have also been found in Europe.

== Species ==
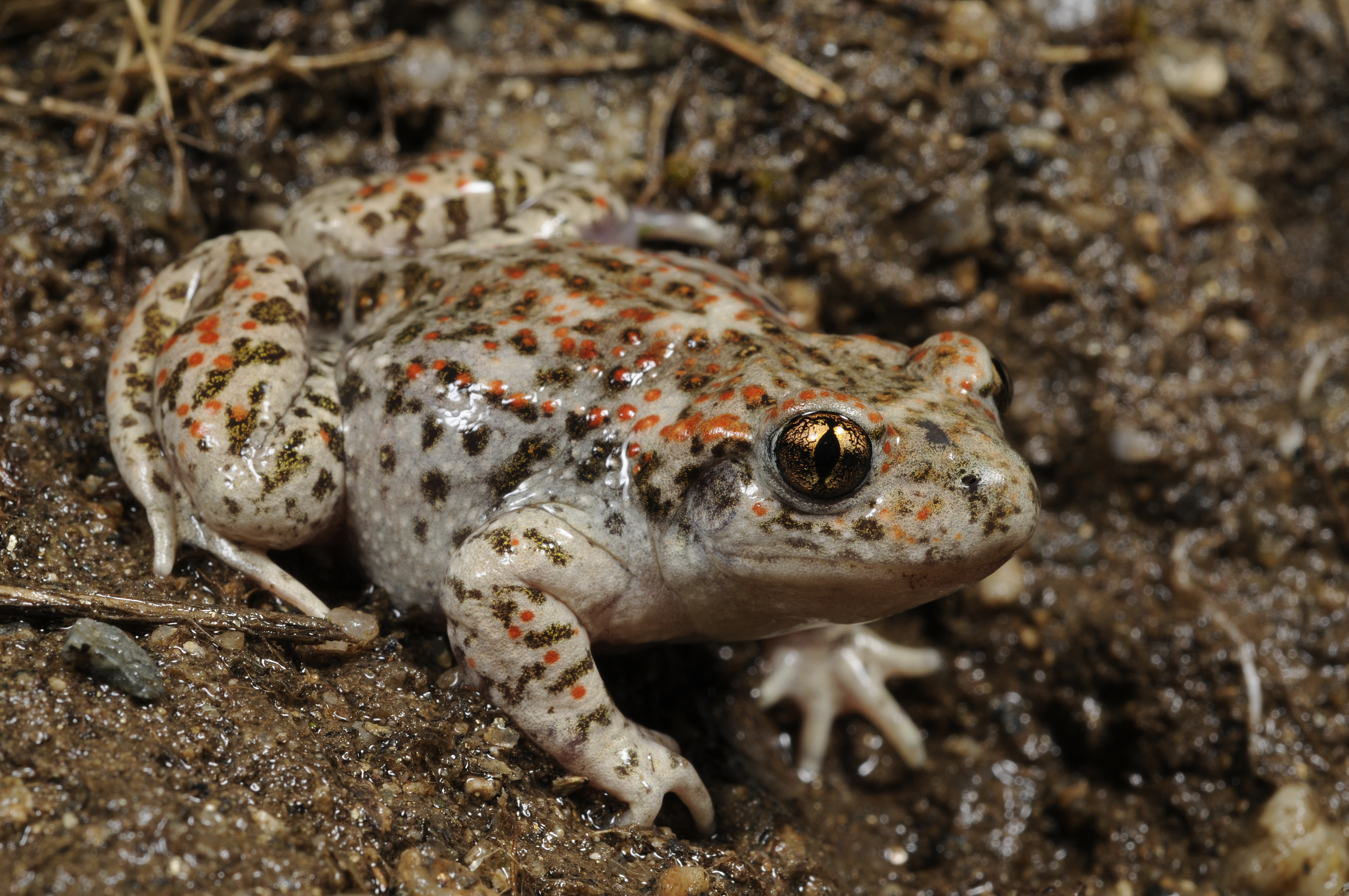
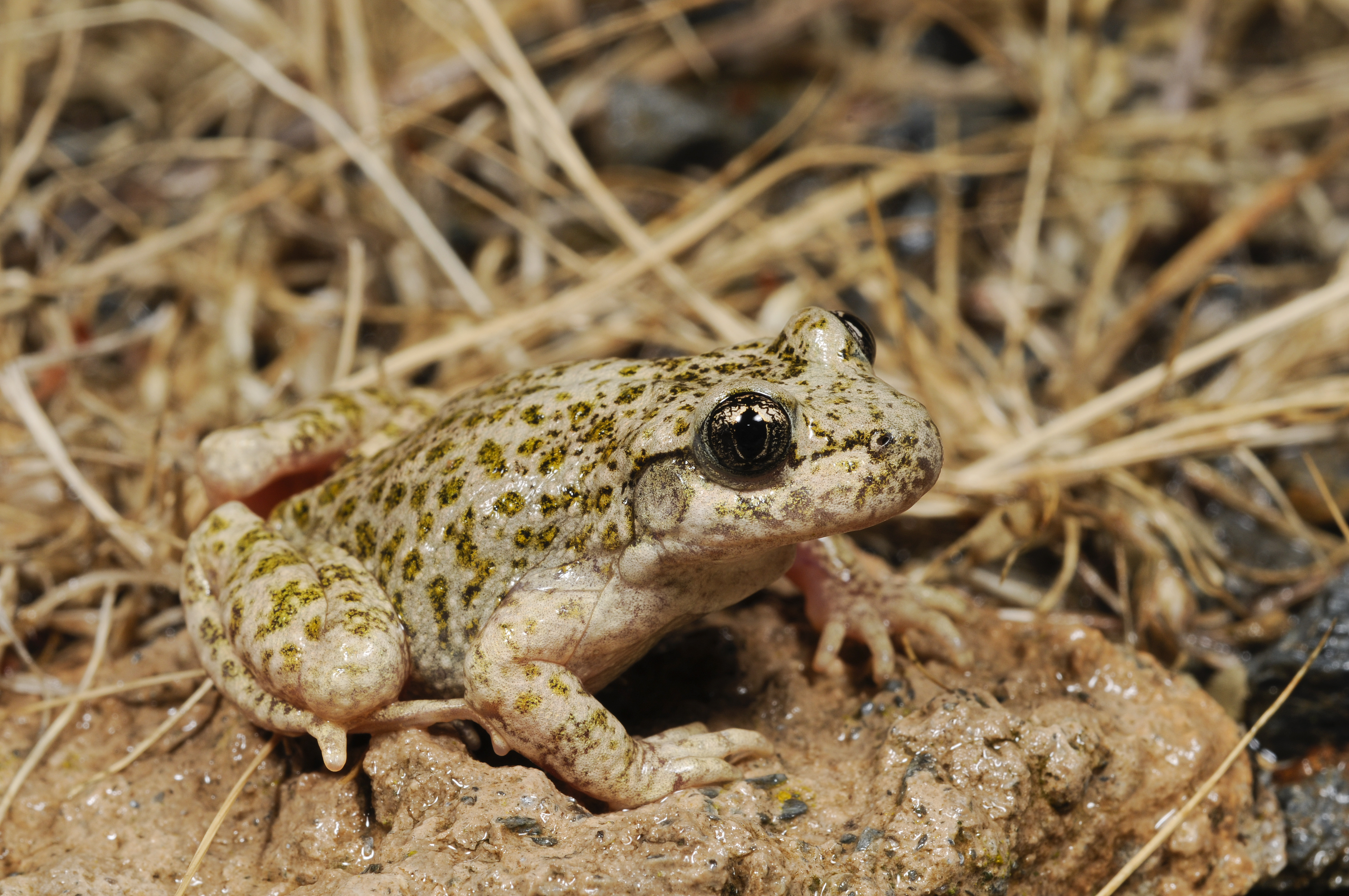
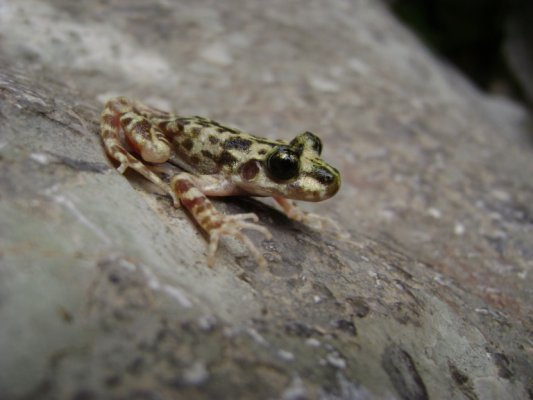
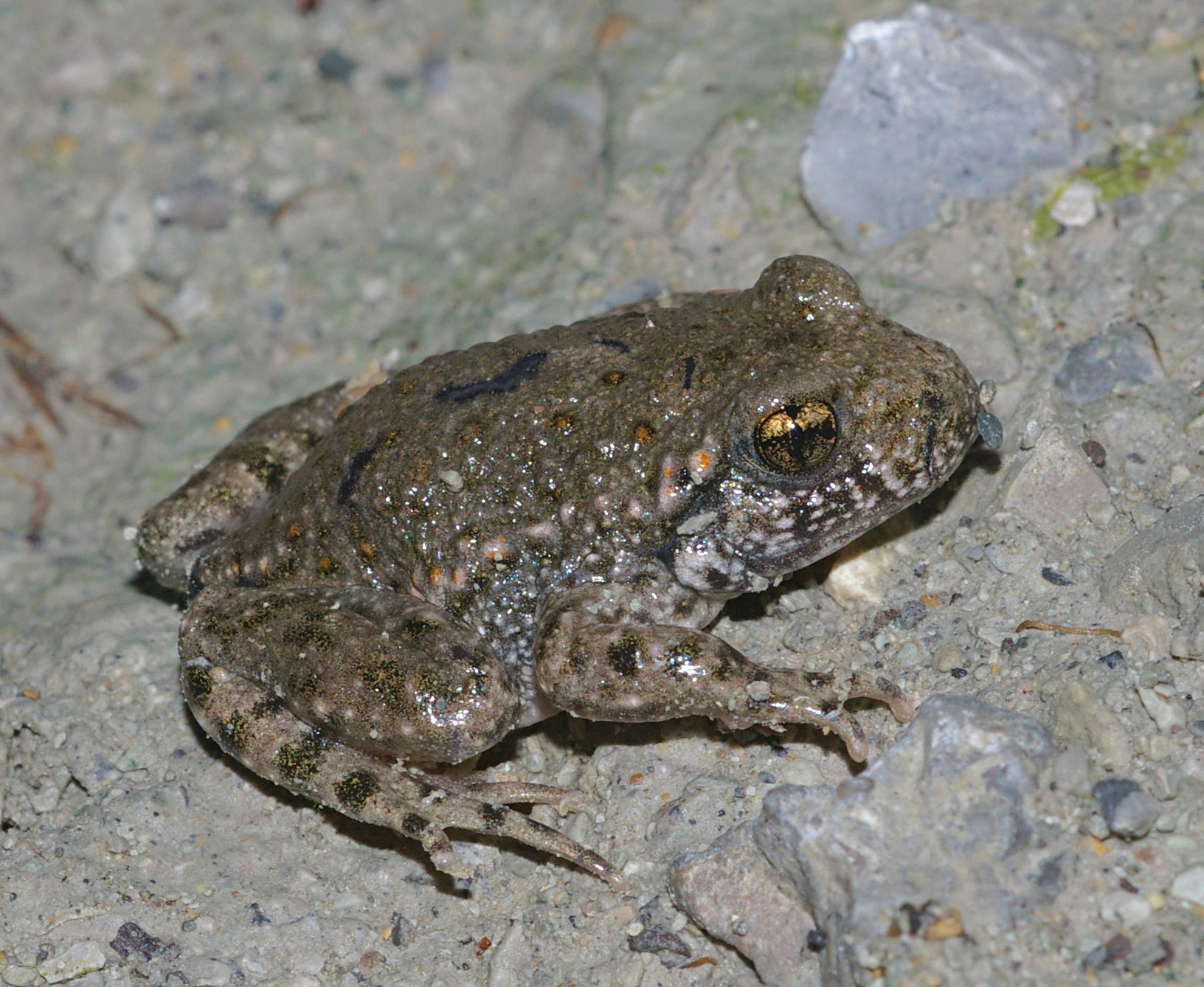
Image	Binomial Name and Author	Common name	Distribution
	Alytes cisternasii (Boscá, 1879)	Iberian midwife toad	Portugal and western Spain
	Alytes dickhilleni (Arntzen & García Paris, 1995)	Betic midwife toad	south eastern Spain.
	Alytes maurus (Pasteur & Bons, 1962)	Moroccan midwife toad	Morocco.
	Alytes muletensis (Sanchiz & Adrover, 1979)	Mallorcan midwife toad	Balearic Island of Mallorca in the Mediterranean Sea
	Alytes obstetricans (Laurenti, 1768)	Common midwife toad	Belgium, France, Germany, Luxembourg, the Netherlands, Portugal, Spain, Switzerland, and the United Kingdom

=== In laboratories ===
Apoptosis, programmed cell death, was first observed in the development of the tadpoles of the midwife toads in 1842 by Carl Vogt.

== See also ==
- Paul Kammerer
