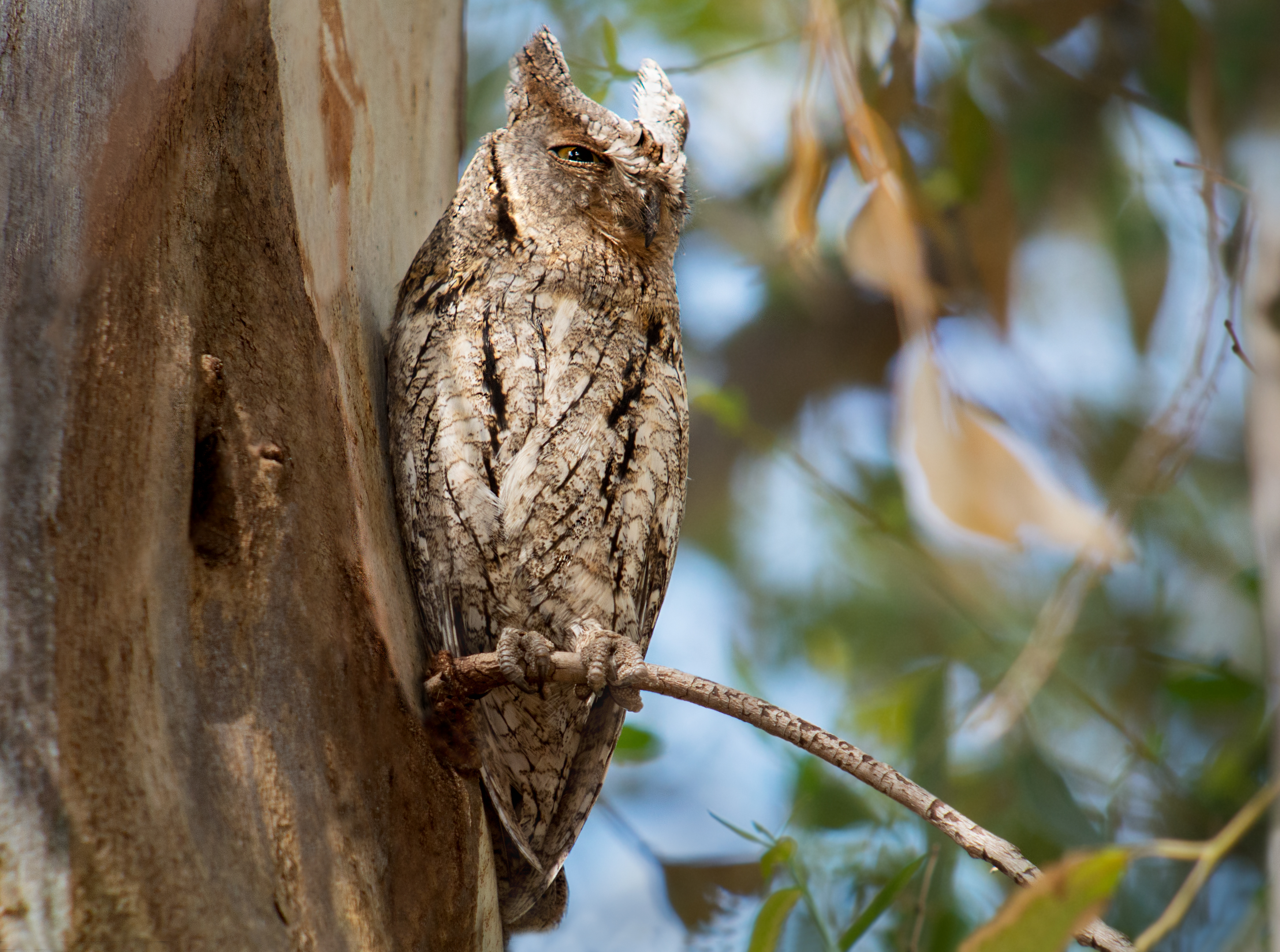

Conservation status
- Least Concern (IUCN 3.1)
- CITES Appendix II

Scientific classification
- Kingdom: Animalia
- Phylum: Chordata
- Class: Aves
- Order: Strigiformes
- Family: Strigidae
- Genus: Otus
- Species: O. scops

Binomial name
- Otus scops (Linnaeus, 1758)
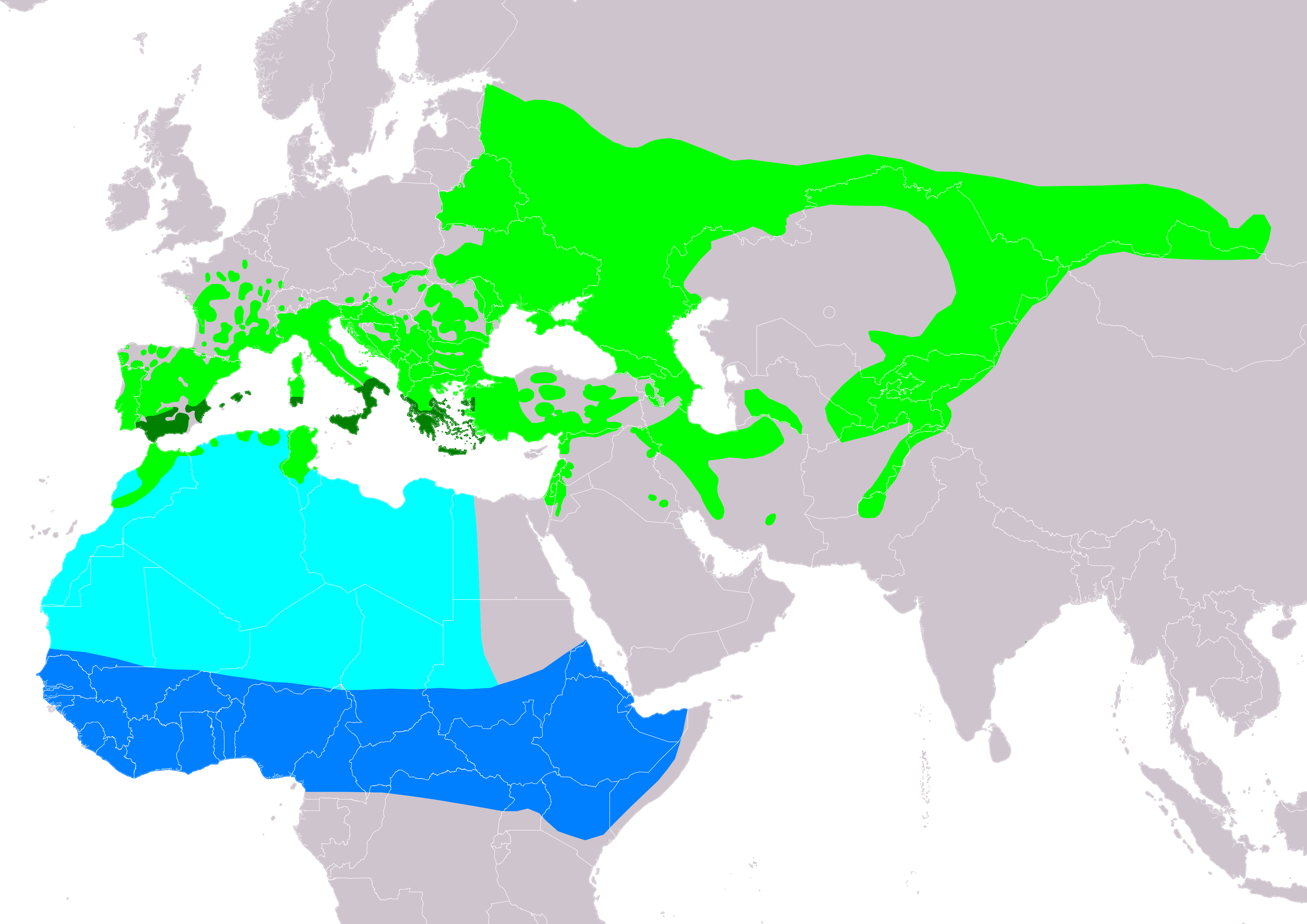
- Range of O. scops Breeding Resident Passage Non-breeding

Synonyms
- Strix scops Linnaeus, 1758; Scops giu (Scop. 1766)

Audio
- Call

= Eurasian scops owl =

Species of owl

The Eurasian scops owl (Otus scops), also known as the European scops owl, common scops owl or just scops owl, is a small owl in the typical owl family Strigidae. Its breeding range extends from southern Europe eastwards to southern Siberia and the western Himalayas. It is migratory, wintering in Africa south of the Sahara, although it is resident year-round in parts of Mediterranean Europe.

== Taxonomy ==
The Eurasian scops owl was formally described by Swedish naturalist Carl Linnaeus in 1758 in the tenth edition of his Systema Naturae. Linnaeus cited the 1599 description by the Italian naturalist Ulisse Aldrovandi, placed it with all the other owls in the genus Strix and coined the binomial name Strix scops. The Eurasian scops owl is now placed in the genus Otus that was introduced in 1769 by Welsh naturalist Thomas Pennant. The genus name is derived from the Latin otus meaning "eared owl". The specific epithet scops is from the Ancient Greek word skōps for a little eared owl. The term is believed to be of Pre-Greek origin; folk etymology links it to σκώπτω (skṓptō, "to mock") or σκέπτομαι (sképtomai, "to examine").

Five subspecies are recognised:

- O. s. scops (Linnaeus, 1758) – France and Italy to the Caucasus area
- O. s. mallorcae von Jordans, 1923 – Iberian Peninsula, Balearic Islands and northwest Africa
- O. s. cycladum (Tschusi, 1904) – southern Greece and Crete to southern Turkey, Syria and Jordan
- O. s. turanicus (Loudon, 1905) – Iraq to northwest Pakistan
- O. s. pulchellus (Pallas, 1771) – Kazakhstan to southern Siberia and western Himalayas

== Description ==
The Eurasian scops owl is 19–21 cm (7.5–8.3 in) in length with a wingspan of 47–54 cm (19–21 in). This is somewhat smaller than the little owl (Athene noctua). It perches upright and shows small ear-tufts. The plumage is predominantly grey-brown in colour, with a paler face, underparts and shoulder line. This species has a strong direct flight on long narrow wings, reflecting its migratory habits.

The call is a deep whistle given by both sexes. It is similar to the call of midwife toads in the genus Alytes.

== Distribution and habitat ==
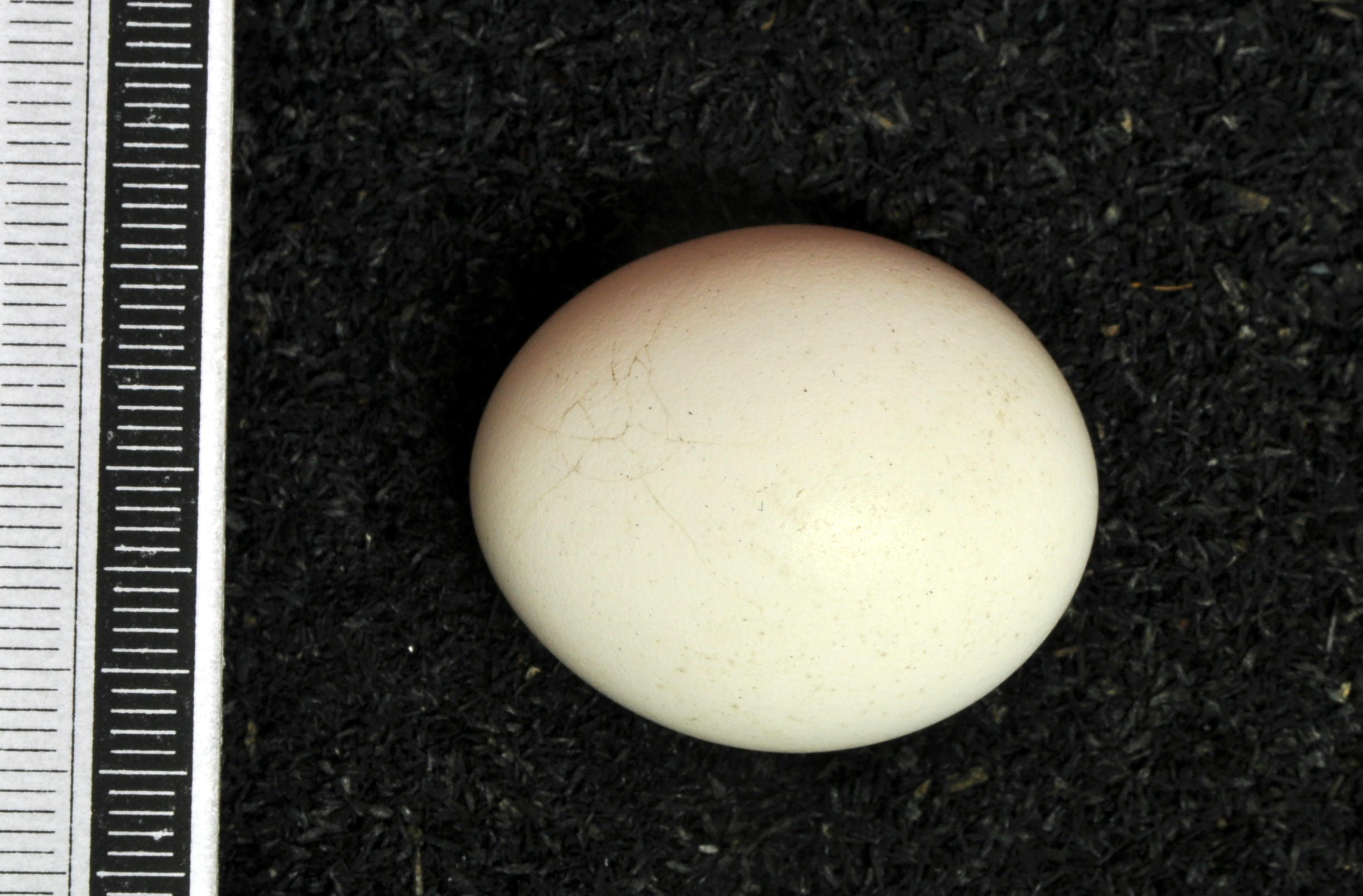
Egg, Collection Museum Wiesbaden

This bird breeds in southern Europe eastwards into western and central Asia. It is migratory, wintering in southernmost Europe and sub-Saharan Africa. It was spotted in Newtown area near Kolkata for a brief period during October 2021. It was the first sighting in eastern India. It is rare any distance north of its breeding range, usually occurring as a spring overshoot. It is unlikely that this nocturnal owl would be found outside the breeding season when it is not calling.

== Behaviour ==
=== Breeding ===
Eurasian scops owls breed in open woodland, parks and gardens. The nest is usually a hole in a tree or in a wall, but can sometimes be an old nest of another species such as a crow. The clutch is usually 4 or 5 eggs. These are white and measure 31 mm × 27 mm (1.2 in × 1.1 in) and weigh around 13 g (0.46 oz). The eggs are incubated only by the female. They hatch after 24-25 days. The young are cared for and fed by both parents. They fledge when aged 21–29 days and become independent of their parents at 30–40 days of age.

=== Diet ===
It takes small prey such as insects and other invertebrates. It is largely nocturnal.

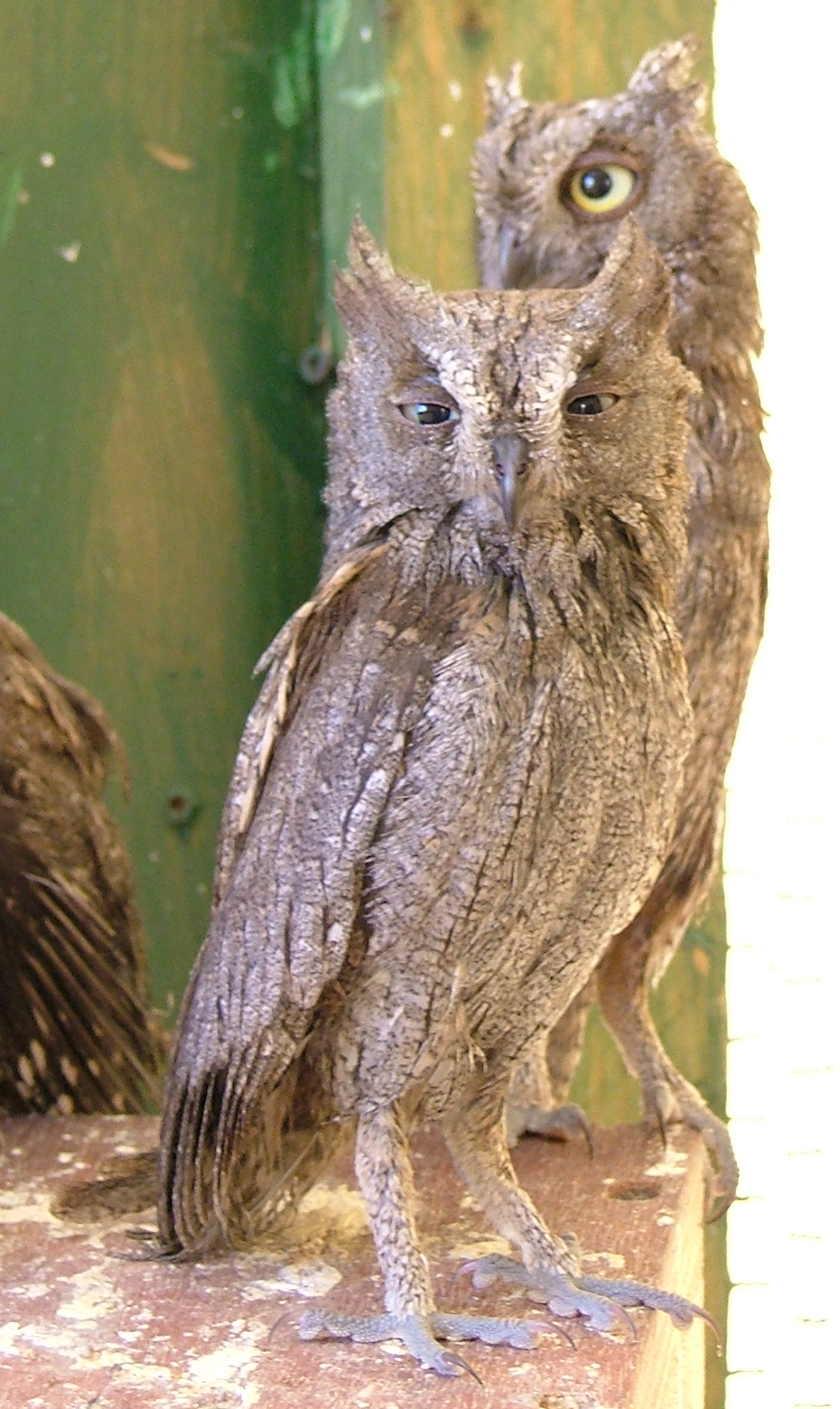
Grey morph

== Sources ==
- Cramp, Stanley, ed. (1985). "Otus scops Scops Owl". Handbook of the Birds of Europe the Middle East and North Africa. The Birds of the Western Palearctic. Vol. IV: Terns to Woodpeckers. Oxford: Oxford University Press. pp. 454–465. ISBN 978-0-19-857507-8.
