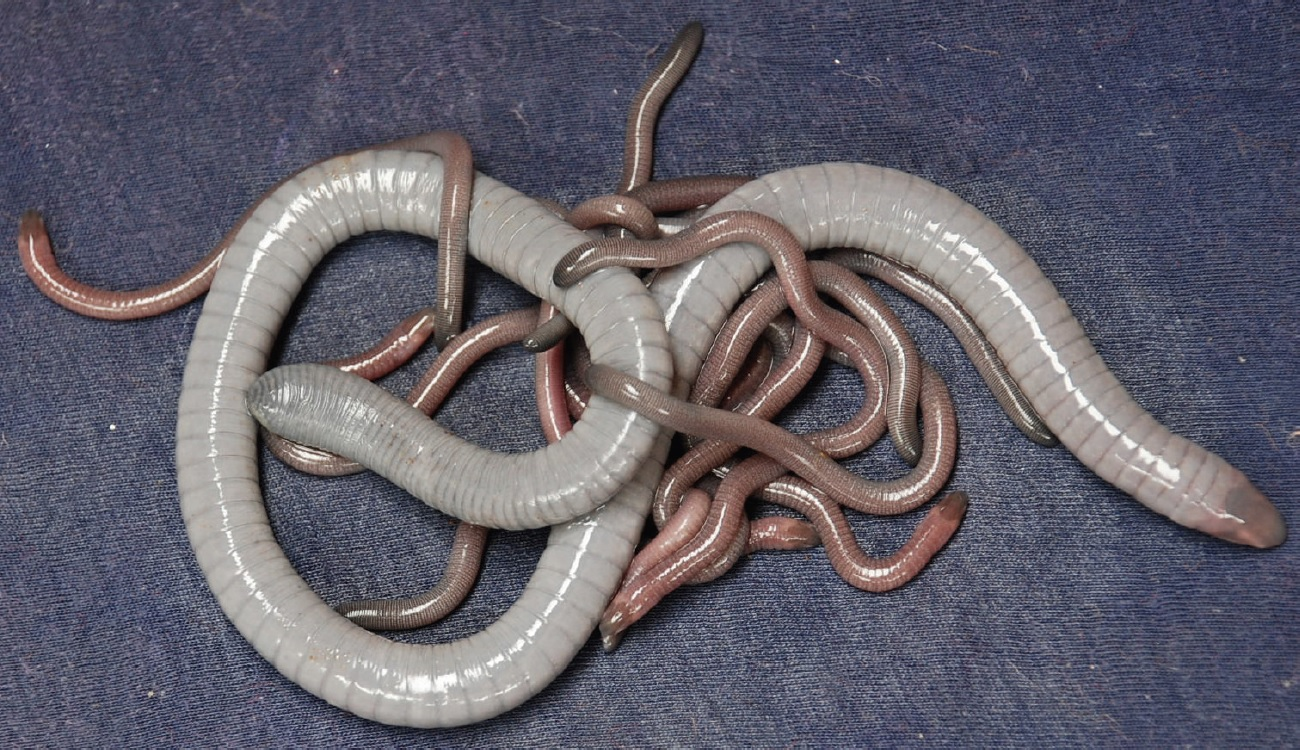
- Female Herpele squalostoma with her young

Scientific classification
- Kingdom: Animalia
- Phylum: Chordata
- Class: Amphibia
- Order: Gymnophiona
- Clade: Apoda
- Family: Herpelidae; Laurent, 1984

Type genus
- Herpele Peters, 1875

Genera
- Boulengerula; Herpele

= Herpelidae =

Family of amphibians

Herpelidae are a family of caecilians, sometimes known as the African caecilians. They are found in Sub-Saharan Africa. Like other caecilians, they superficially resemble worms or snakes. They are the sister group to the newly discovered Chikilidae.

== Distribution ==
Herpelidae occur primarily in Central and East Africa, barely reaching West Africa (southeastern Nigeria), and northern parts of Southern Africa (Malawi, possibly Zambia).

== Genera ==
There are two genera with ten species in total:

- Boulengerula Tornier, 1896 – Boulenger's caecilians, Usambara bluish-gray caecilians (8 species)
- Herpele Peters, 1880 – Congo caecilians (2 species)
