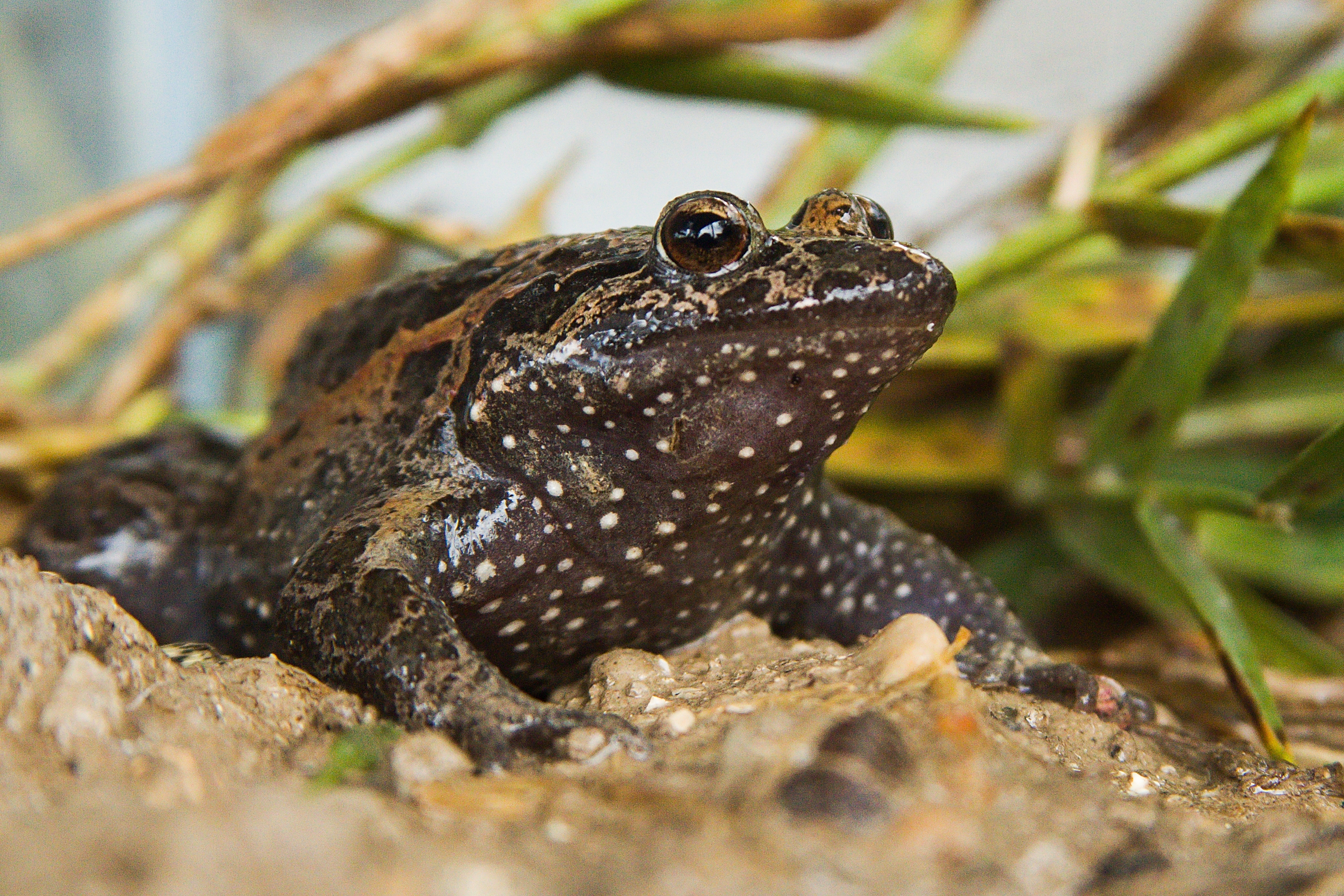

Conservation status
- Critically Endangered (IUCN 3.1)

Scientific classification
- Kingdom: Animalia
- Phylum: Chordata
- Class: Amphibia
- Order: Anura
- Family: Alytidae
- Genus: Latonia
- Species: L. nigriventer

Binomial name
- Latonia nigriventer (Mendelssohn & Steinitz, 1943)
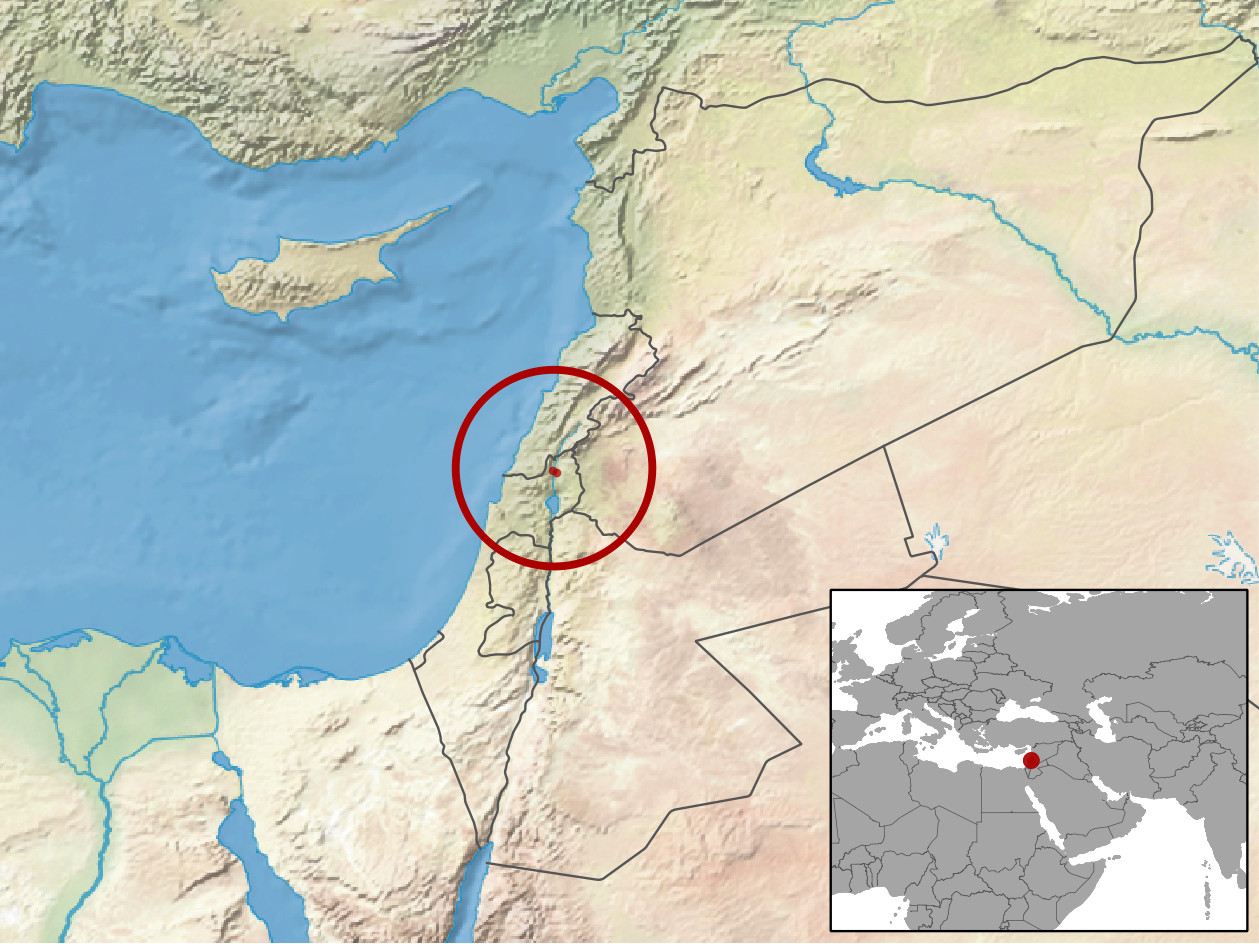

Synonyms
- Discoglossus nigriventer Mendelssohn and Steinitz, 1943

= Hula painted frog =

Hula painted frog Temporal range: Calabrian - Present, 1.5–0 Ma

Species of amphibian endemic to Israel

The Hula painted frog (Latonia nigriventer) is a species of frog endemic to the Lake Hula marshes in northern Israel. It is the only living member of the genus Latonia, which is otherwise known from fossils from Europe spanning from the Oligocene to the Pleistocene. The Hula painted frog was thought to be extinct as a result of habitat destruction during the 1950s until the species was rediscovered in 2011.

The draining of Lake Hula and its marshes in the 1950s was thought to have caused the extinction of this frog, along with the cyprinid fish Mirogrex hulensis and cichlid fish Tristramella intermedia. Only five individuals had been found prior to the draining of the lake. Environmental improvements in the Hula reserve have been cited as a possible reason for the frog's reemergence.

== Taxonomy ==
On March 22, 1940, the biologists Heinrich Mendelssohn and Heinz Steinitz discovered two specimens apparently belonging to a new species of the frog genus Discoglossus on the eastern shore of Lake Hula in Safed, in the Northern District of Mandatory Palestine. The largest of the frogs swallowed the smaller one while they were kept in a terrarium. Two tadpoles of the species from the same locality were discovered by Steinitz in August 1940. In 1943, Mendelssohn and Steinitz named the new species Discoglossus nigriventer, designating a female of the captured specimens then housed at the Hebrew University in Jerusalem as the holotype specimen and the tadpoles as the paratype specimens.

Little is known about its history, because few specimens have been found by scientists. Two adults and two tadpoles were collected in 1940 and a single specimen was found in 1955. This would prove to be the last record of this species until 2011.

The frog's Hebrew name, Agulashon shehor-gahon (Black-bellied round-tongued), derives from its black belly and round tongue.

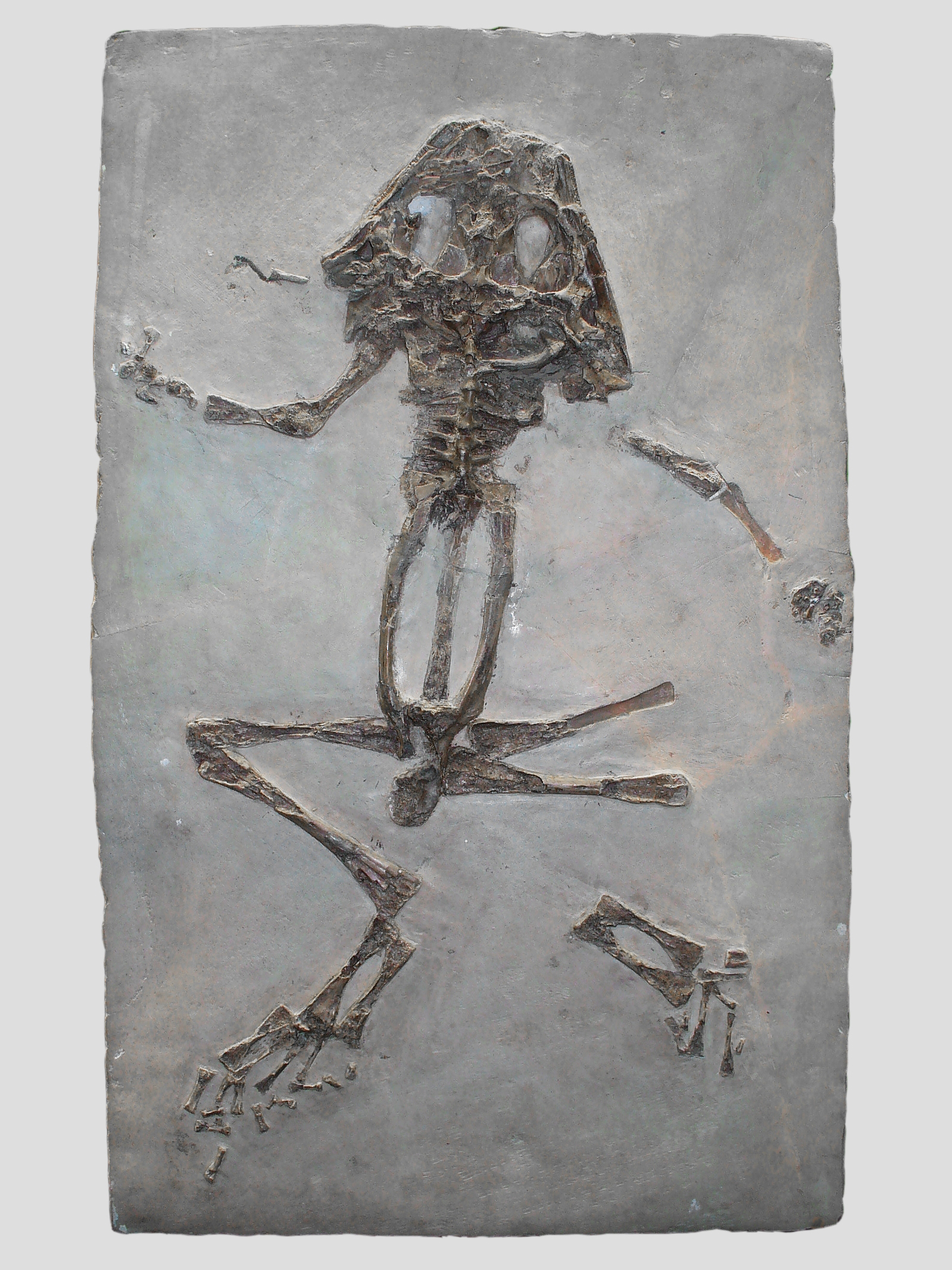
Fossil of the prehistoric relative Latonia seyfriedii

This frog was originally proposed to be a member of the genus Discoglossus, but further genetic and morphological assessment after the rediscovery of the species led a reassignment to genus Latonia, for which no other living examples are known. Fossils of Latonia are known in Europe spanning from the Upper Oligocene until the Early Pleistocene. The closest relative of Latonia is considered to be Discoglossus. On this basis, the Hula painted frog has been labeled a living fossil, the only extant representative of an ancient genetic split.

- - Ascaphus truei
  - - Bombinatoridae
      - Bombina maxima
      - - Bombina variegata
        - - Bombina bombina
          - Bombina orientalis
    - Alytidae
      - Alytes
        - Alytes cisternasii
        - - Alytes obstetricans
          - - Alytes muletensis
            - - Alytes dickhilleni
              - Alytes maurus
      - Discoglossinae
        - Latonia nigriventer (Hula painted frog)
        - Discoglossus
          - Discoglossus montalentii
          - - - Discoglossus pictus
              - Discoglossus sardus
            - - Discoglossus scovazzi
              - - Discoglossus galganoi
                - Discoglossus jeanneae

== Description ==
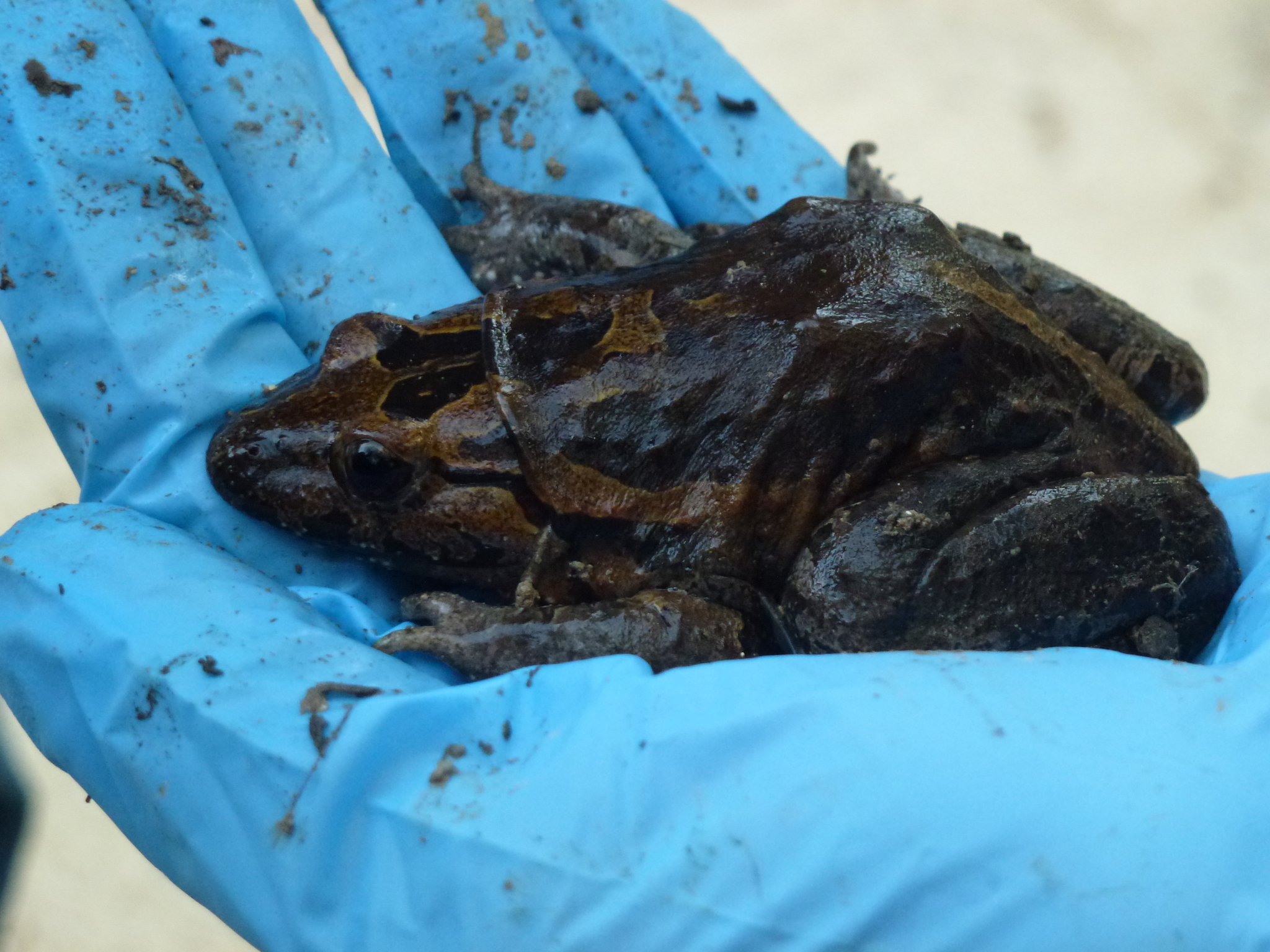
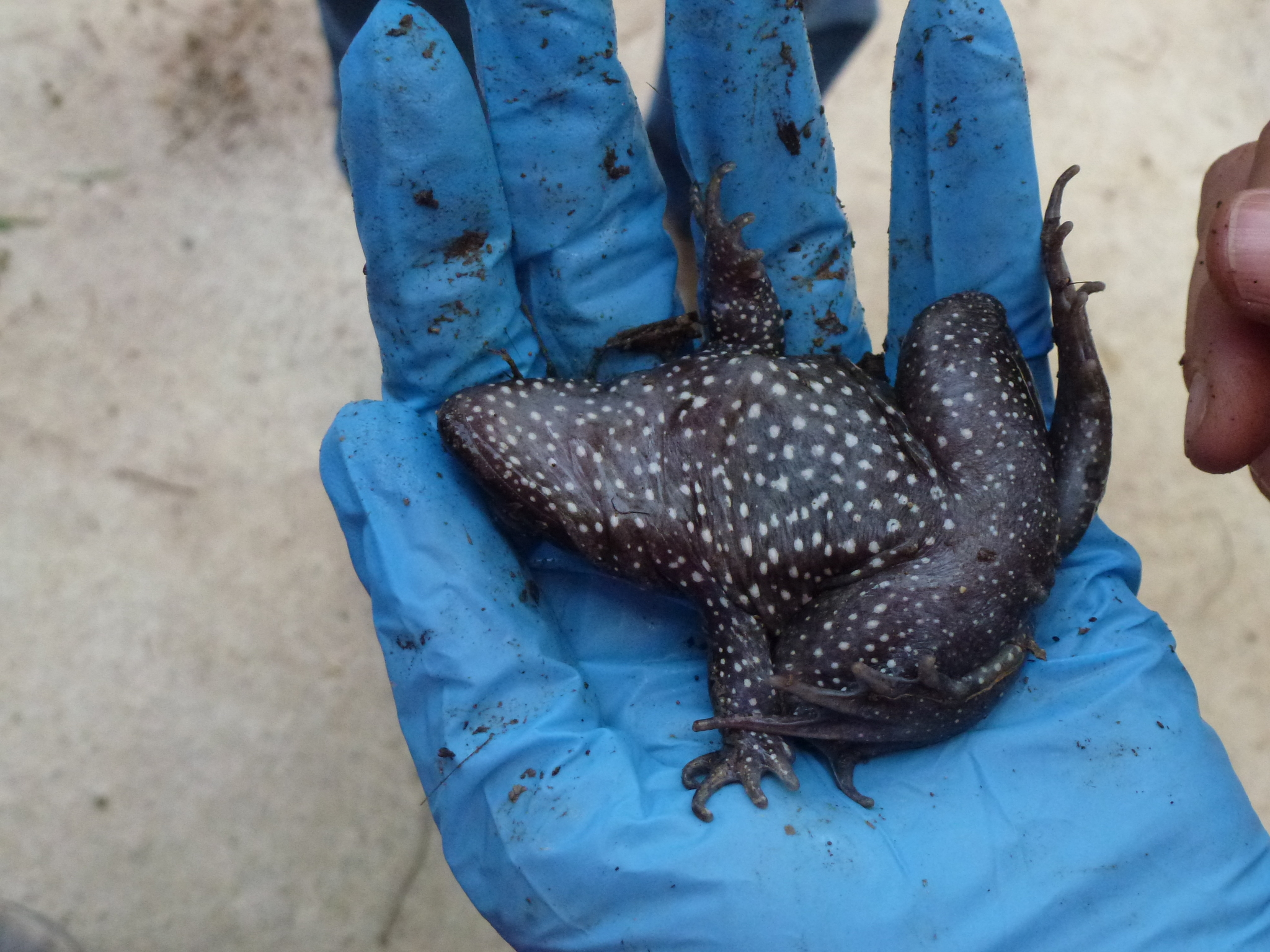
Specimen in hand seen from the upper and underside

The Hula painted frog is sexually dimorphic in size; females measure between 40.0–128.4 millimetres (1.57–5.06 in) and weigh 26 g (0.91 oz) on average, while males are slightly smaller and grow 66.6–121.3 millimetres (2.62–4.78 in) long and weigh about 13 g (0.45 oz). This species has a dark belly with small white spots, with adults having more of these spots than juveniles. It is colored ochre above with a rusty colour grading into dark olive-grey to greyish-black on the sides. A band of lighter color stretching down the middle of the back is present near the hind part of the animal. There is no significant sexual dimorphism in this frog, though the webbing of the feet may be slightly weaker in females.

The head is flattened and about as wide as it is long, with no canthal ridge. The distance between the eyes is at least equal to the width of the eyelid, a feature distinguishing it from the Mediterranean painted frog (Discoglossus pictus) whose eyes are closer together. The nostrils are located closer to both the tip of the snout and to each other than to the eyes, and each has a rectangular shape with rounded corners. The tympana are taller than they are wide, but not distinctly visible. The snout protrudes forward beyond the mouth, though not as far as that of the Mediterranean painted frog, while the angle of the mandible has a process which corresponds to a hollow in the upper jaw. Inside the mouth are a pair of vomerine teeth, each located behind a rectangular choana with rounded corners. The tongue has a roundish triangular shape, with smooth edges and no furrows, and is adhesive aside from a small margin. A pair of glandular ridges extends from the back of each eye, one over the tympanum towards the base of the arm, and the other stretches straight backwards and splits into multiple warts at the shoulder level. The whole upper surface of the animal is dotted with warts, some of which are arranged in rows or groups. The fingers may have rounded or pointed tips and are not webbed, though the toes are partly webbed at the base. The length of the hind legs with the feet included exceeds the snout-vent length, while the foot itself is slightly shorter than the shin. In both sexes the arms are long and robust, with well-developed muscles; this is unusual among frogs as typically only male frogs have robust arms, which are used to grasp the female during amplexus. In Hula painted frogs, the robustness of the arms is believed to be an adaptation for digging or feeding.

=== Tadpoles ===
The tadpoles of the Hula painted frog are small, with total lengths of 14 millimetres (0.55 in) and 24 millimetres (0.94 in) at Gosner stages 25 and 34 respectively. The main body (excluding the tail) of the tadpole has an oval shape when viewed from above, being widest about a third of its length away from the rounded snout. When viewed from the side, the snout slopes downwards. The upper surface is a medium brown color with golden speckles and a network of black lines forming a net-like pattern. The underbelly is translucent, allowing the internal anatomy to be seen through it, and possesses a single crescent-shaped spiracle located in its middle. The width of this spiracle is about a quarter the width of the mouth. The oral disc contains teeth arranged into double rows surrounding the serrated, partly keratinized jaw sheaths, with two upper double rows and three lower double rows present, of which one of the lower rows is split in the middle to accommodate the jaw sheath. A series of papillae (small fleshy protrusions) is present on the margins the lips, and is split in the middle of the upper lip. The nostrils are small and rounded, located closer to the snout than to the eyes, and each has a dark spot behind it. The eyes are located on top of the head and oriented sideways, making them invisible when the tadpole is viewed from below. The tail is a slightly lighter color than the main body and grows long, being around 169% the length of the main body. Moderately high caudal fins are located on the upper and lower sides of the tail. These fins are translucent and bear irregular dark brown spots of varying sizes. The musculature of the tail does not reach the tail tip.

== Distribution and habitat ==
The Hula painted frog is endemic to Hula Valley of Israel and has an extremely limited range, known only from an area of less than 2 km^{2} (0.77 sq mi). It has only been recorded from two localities, the Hula National Reserve and the village of Yesud HaMa'ala, located about 1 kilometre (0.62 mi) apart from each other. It was formerly more widespread, as evidenced by fossil remains of this species found at the Ubeidiya prehistoric site in the Jordan Valley, dating back to the Calabrian stage of the Early Pleistocene epoch (around 1.5 million years ago). The Hula Valley had survived as an area containing major water bodies such as Lake Hula throughout the Pleistocene epoch, when geological activity and climatic changes led to a dramatic decline in suitable habitat for Latonia frogs, allowing the valley to serve as a refugium for the species while the genus became extinct elsewhere. Although a 2017 study found that environmental DNA of this frog was also present in the Agamon Ha-Hula nature park and the Ein Te'o nature reserve, it was also noted that since most water bodies in the Hula Valley are interconnected via streams and canals, the presence of DNA at a site could be due to it being washed downstream from a different area and is not definitive evidence that the frog itself is present.

This species is semiaquatic (though mainly terrestrial) and is known to inhabit both terrestrial and aquatic habitats. Adults have been recorded in damp, peaty soil underneath 20–30 centimetres (7.9–11.8 in) of decomposed leaf litter amongst thickets of common reed, holy bramble and occasionally fig trees, as well as beneath dried grass or in burrows near water. In Yesud HaMa'ala, the Hula painted frog is known from a single ditch approximately 600 metres (2,000 ft) long, with slow-flowing water that reaches a maximum depth of about 150 centimetres (4.9 ft). This ditch is supplied by a small permanent spring and has a thick layer of mud at its bottom, while dense vegetation occurs both in and around the water, with the present plant species including common reed, water lettuce and common duckweed.

== Biology ==
A mostly nocturnal and solitary species, the Hula painted frog is most often seen after nightfall and does not aggregate with others of its kind. It is semiaquatic and frequently enters water, often observed submerged at night with only the snout protruding above the surface. On land, the Hula painted frog is known to dig into the ground, and has been found beneath 20–30 centimetres (7.9–11.8 in) of decomposed leaf litter, though it does also inhabit burrows made by other animals such as small mammals or freshwater crabs. This species has robust arms which it uses to dig head first into the soil, its reinforced skull and stout upper body being well adapted to support this behavior.

The Hula painted frog is a skittish animal, and has been noted to be more easily scared by human disturbance (such as the light of electric torches) than the Levant water frog (Pelophylax bedriagae) or the Savigny's treefrog (Hyla savignyi). When disturbed, it may retreat into the water and swim towards thickets of dense roots and aquatic plants, or burrow underground if the soil is loose enough for it to do so, while increasing the secretion of skin mucus to aid itself in moving through vegetation or soil. Captured individuals have been known to freeze in motion before slowly jumping or walking forward in attempt to escape, and adults will utter a call which sounds similar to the presumed advertisement calls of the species, but not as intense or regular.

Surveys of this species at Yesud HaMa'ala have found that the population at this locality had a very high percentage of injury, with 28% of the 112 surveyed medium to large-sized individuals exhibiting minor injuries. Some of these injuries were recently inflicted while others were old, and were primarily on located on the hind legs. This combined with the low number of small individuals observed has been proposed to be a sign that the Hula painted frog faces high pressure from predation in its early life stages. Potential predators of the juveniles include invertebrates such as crustaceans, dragonfly nymphs, ground beetles and wolf spiders, as well as vertebrates such as the western mosquitofish, Levant water frog and Caspian turtle, all of which are known to prey on amphibians and occur within the range of the Hula painted frog. While its larger size presumably protects it from some of these predators, the adult Hula painted frog is not immune to predation, and is known to be taken by white-throated kingfishers.

=== Diet and feeding ===
Like most other amphibians, the Hula painted frog is a carnivore. While it has not been observed feeding in its natural habitat, the gut contents of a road-killed specimin included the remains of four Caracollina lenticula snails and a woodlouse of the species Porcellionides pruinosus. Compared to most frogs, this species has a particularly reinforced skull and powerful jaw muscles, enabling it to exert a great amount of force when closing its jaws. This is believed to be an adaptation to allow painted hula frogs to feed on hard-shelled prey. It is also possible that this species uses its robust arms in feeding; frogs of the unrelated genus Paracassina have similar skull and arm adaptations, and have been proposed to remove snails from their shells by applying pressure to the shell using its arms while holding the snail in its jaws. Unlike most other frogs, Hula painted frogs do not use their tongues when catching prey. This species is also known to be cannabalistic, as there is a recorded instance in which one Hula painted frog swallowed a smaller individual while the two were kept in a terrarium.

=== Vocalizations ===
Two types of vocalizations produced by the Hula painted frog; one is presumably an advertisement call and is uttered by males at the surface of the water, and the other is a distress call uttered by both sexes when handled. The latter sounds mostly similar to the former, but is not as intensely or regularly uttered. Although it is possible that this species can produce other vocalizations, the fact that it lacks externally visible vocal sacs suggests its calls are limited to communication over short distances. The advertisement call lasts for 725 to 1212 milliseconds and is usually uttered in a series, with each call separated from the next by a short interval of silence lasting 246 to 1606 milliseconds. Both advertisement and distress is composed of two notes; the first is produced by expiration (breathing out) and lasts about 671 milliseconds, while the second is a shorter note produced by inspiration (breathing in) which lasts about 291 milliseconds. These two notes are consecutive, with no silent interval between them, and the inspiratory note has a higher intensity and lower frequency than the expiratory note. The advertisement call has a low intensity and frequency, with a dominant frequency peak averaged over the entire call of 775.5 hertz.

=== Reproduction ===
Although breeding has not been observed in Hula painted frogs, it has been theorized that the species has a prolonged breeding period which lasts at least from March to June, and possibly as long as from February to September since most adults are observed in water during this time. This is further supported by the fact that during this time, male Hula painted frogs develop prominent nuptial pads and other keratinous outgrowths which are commonly used to hold onto the female during amplexus. There are also records of tadpoles during May and August. A female found dead in mid-January had several hundred oocytes, each around 1.5–2 millimetres (0.059–0.079 in) in diameter and greyish-black in color. Reproduction in this species is presumably similar to that of frogs in the related genus Discoglossus, which exhibit short, intense periods of inguinal amplexus (with the arms of the male clasped around the waist of the female), during which the female lays several batches of eggs in a body of water that adhere to plants, rocks or the bottom of the water body.

== Status ==
=== Decline ===
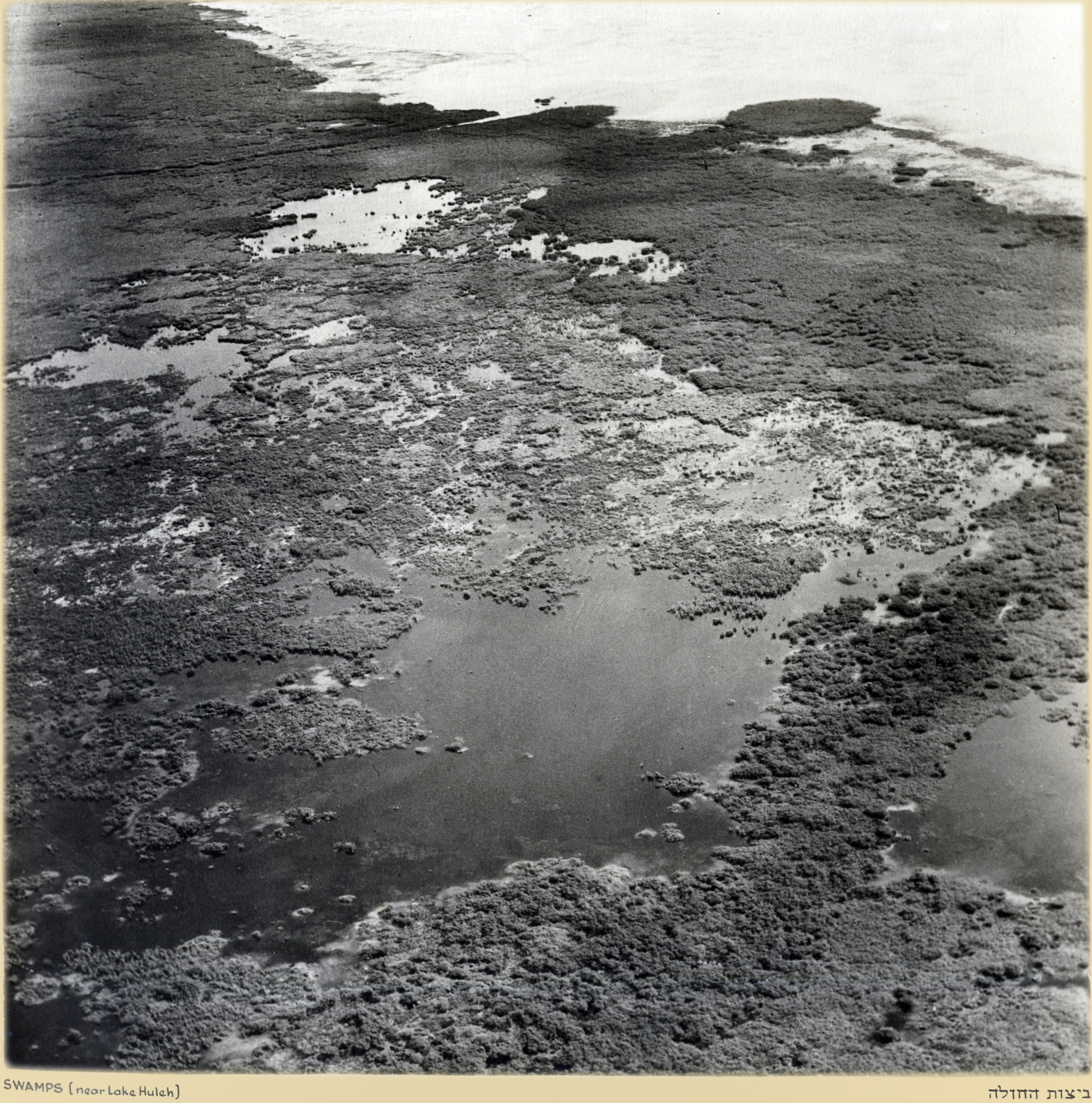
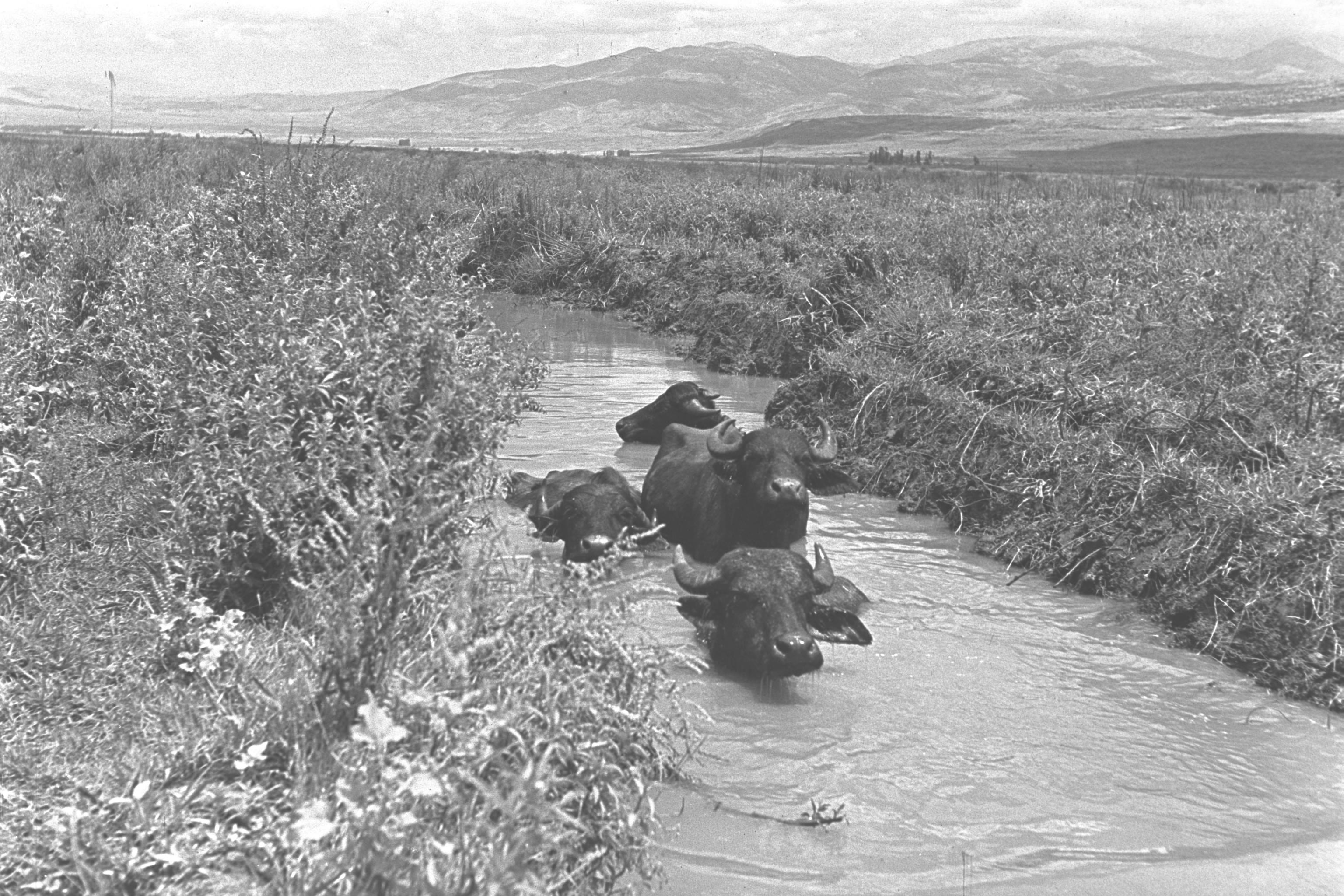
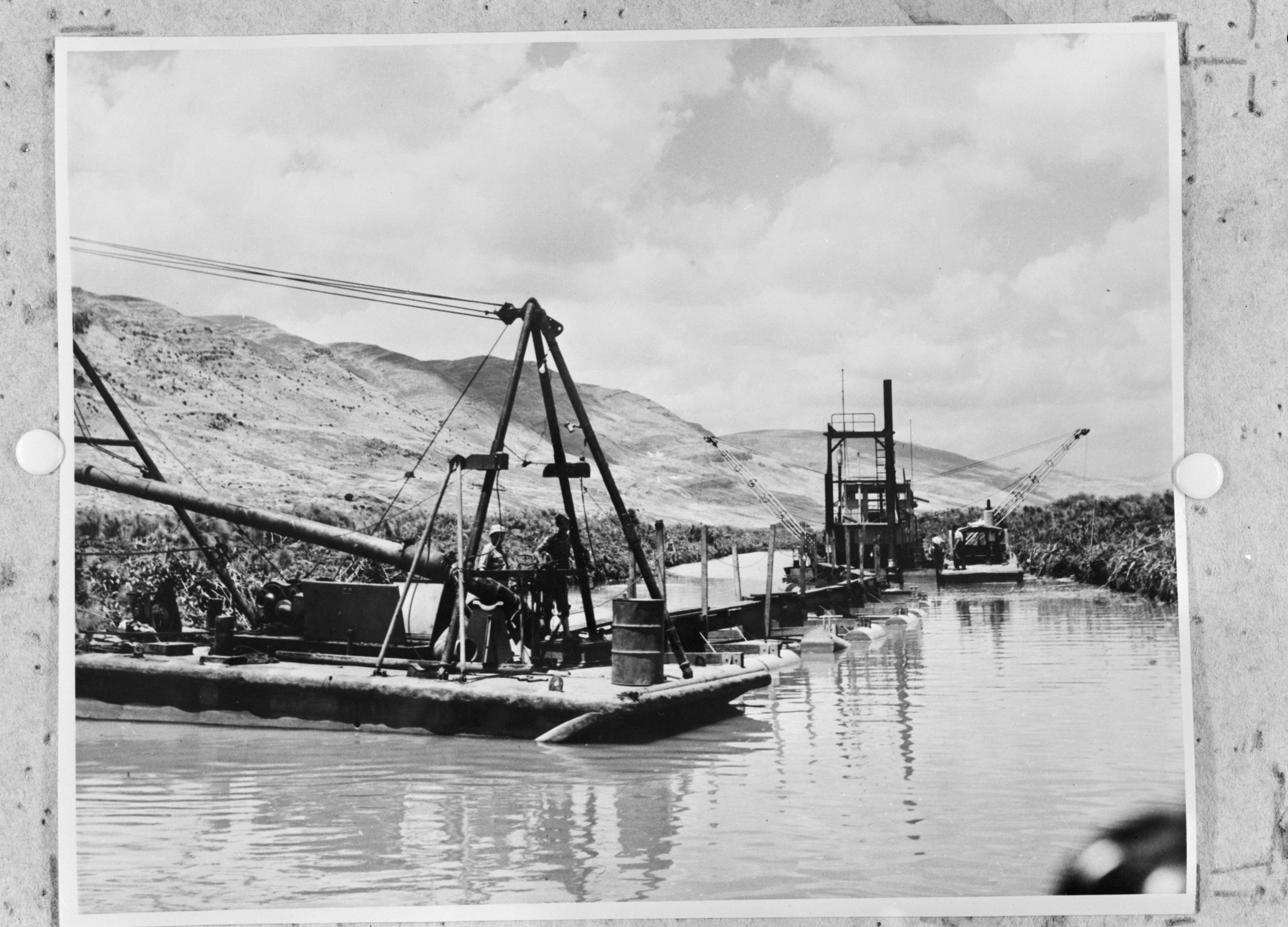
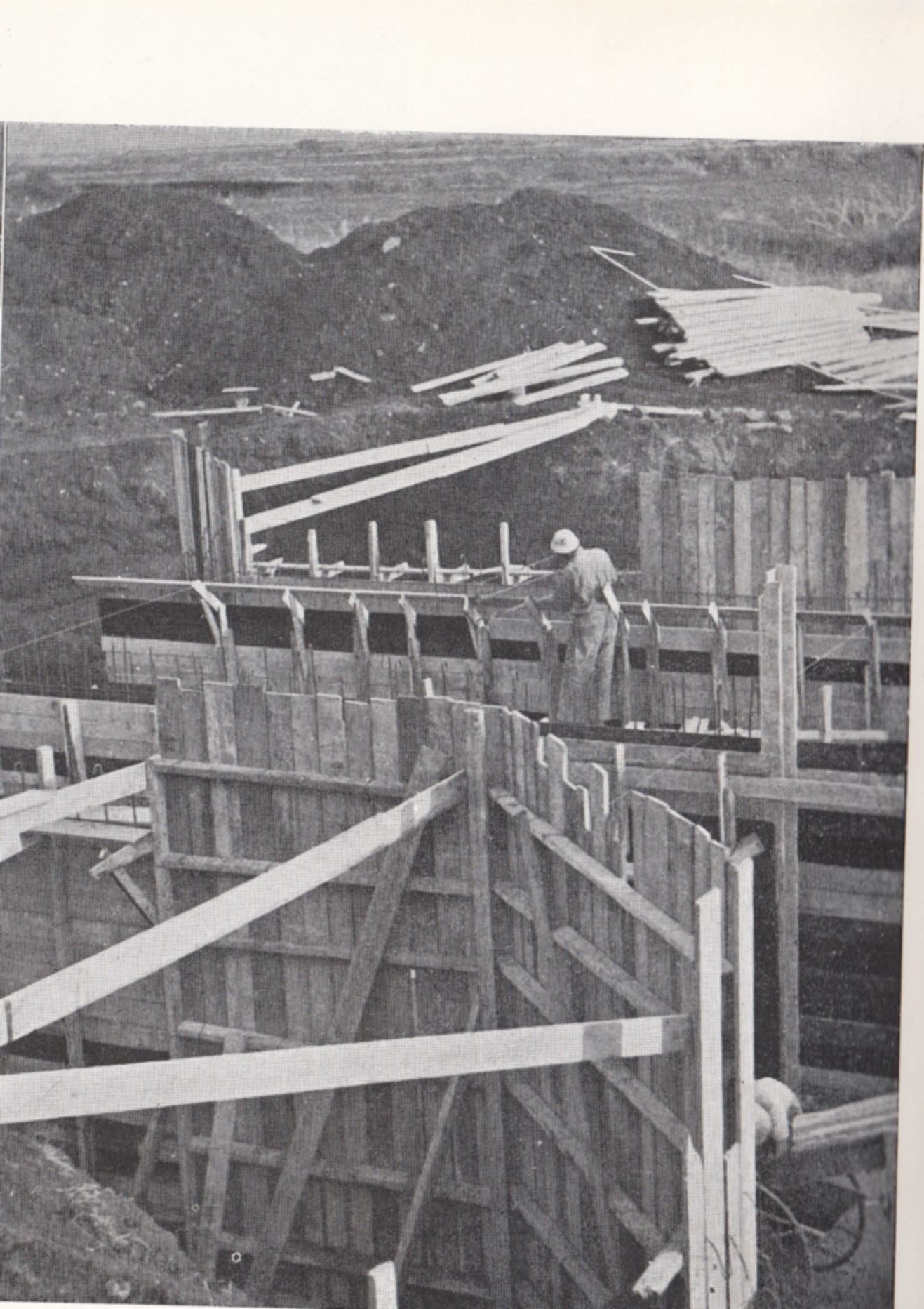
Swamps near Lake Hula in the late 1930s (above) and later water management installations there (below)

The draining of Lake Hula and its marshes in the 1950s was thought to have caused the extinction of this frog, along with the cyprinid fish Mirogrex hulensis and cichlid fish Tristramella intermedia. Only five individuals had been found prior to the draining of the lake. Environmental improvements in the Hula reserve have been cited as a possible reason for the frog's reemergence.

In 1996, the IUCN classified this species as "extinct in the wild", the very first amphibian to be given that designation by the IUCN. Israel continued to list it as an endangered species. Following the rediscovery of the species in 2011, the IUCN now considers the frog to be critically endangered as its known habitat occupies less than 2 km^{2}.

In 2000, a scientist from the Lebanese nature protection organisation A Rocha claimed he had seen a frog species which could be Latonia nigriventer in the Aammiq Wetland south of the Beqaa Valley in Lebanon. However, two French-Lebanese-British expeditions in the years 2004 and 2005 yielded no confirmation as to the further existence of this species. In August 2010, a search organised by the Amphibian Specialist Group of the International Union for Conservation of Nature set out to look for various species of frogs thought to be extinct in the wild, including the Hula painted frog.

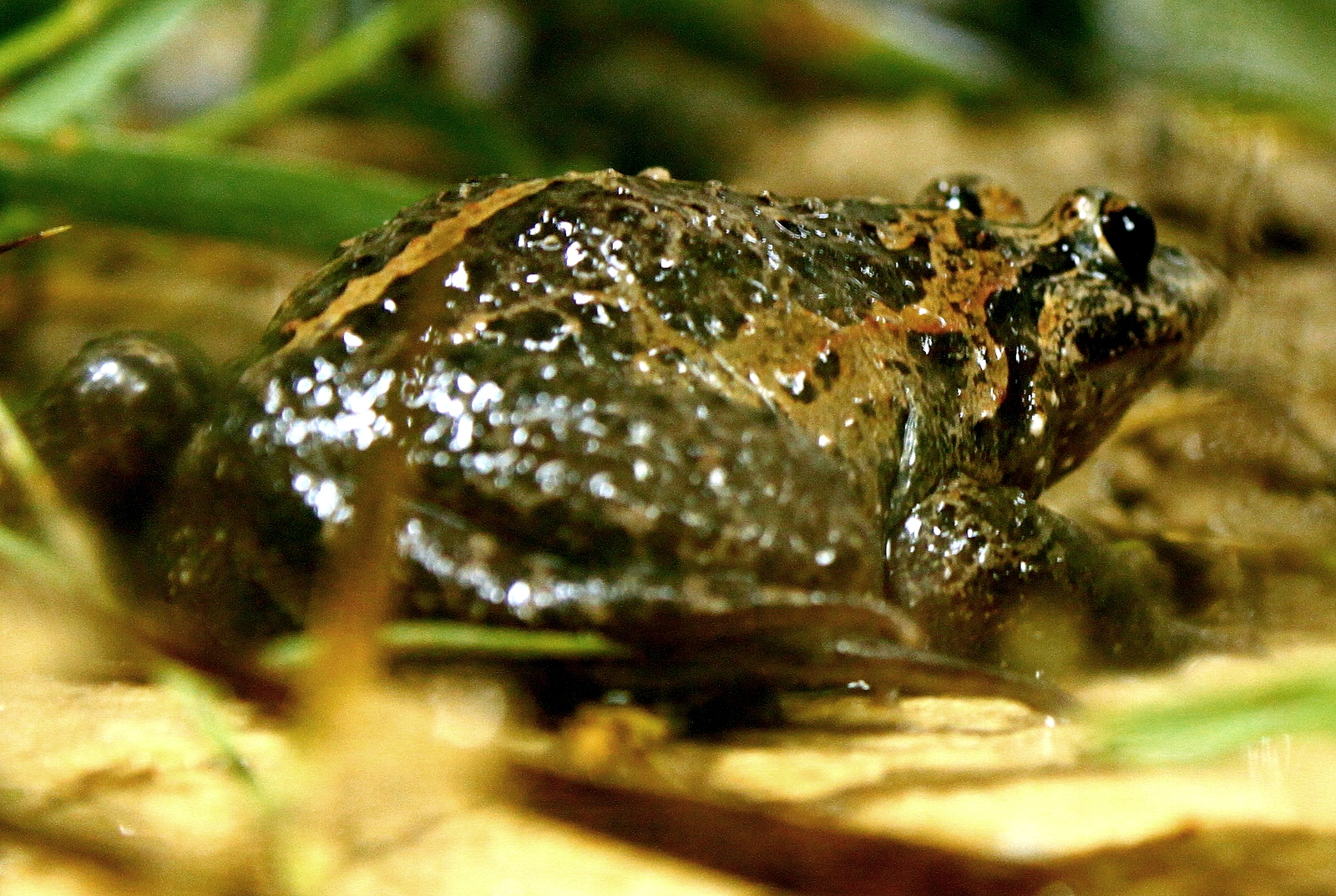
The female specimen found in the 2011 rediscovery

In 2013, a study published in Nature Communications revealed that in 2011 during a routine patrol at the Hula Nature Reserve, ranger Yoram Malka found the frog, which he immediately suspected as being the Hula painted frog, as he claimed he has been on the lookout for it for many years. Scientists confirmed that it was one of this rare species. An ecologist with the Israel Nature and Parks Authority credited the rehydration of the area for the frog sighting. On November 29, a second specimen was located in the same area. The second Hula painted frog, a female, was found in swampy weeds twenty centimeters deep. It weighed 13 grams, half the weight of its male counterpart. Since the discovery of the first specimen, at least ten more individuals have been found, all in the same area.

In 2016, a team led by Professor Sarig Gafni of the Ruppin Academic Center's School of Marine Sciences discovered populations totaling several hundred individuals by searching in water at night, finding populations in 17 of the 52 Hula Valley water holes they surveyed.

=== Conservation ===
In 2017, an article published in the Molecular Ecology Journal, mentions of a group of scientists who investigated the suitable aquatic habitats for Hula painted frogs using the environmental DNA (eDNA) approach. The Hula Lake once provided a habitat for many rare species, including Hula painted frogs. Since its rediscovery in 2011, there have been efforts to study and protect the species. However, these efforts have been hampered by its elusive nature.

Researchers have detected the presence of Hula painted frogs using eDNA sampling and physical searches at 22 of 52 sites surveyed in the Hula Nature Reserve, Agamon ha-Hula, and Ein Te'o Nature Reserve. These regions overlap with the former Hula Lake region, and also contain organic, and colluvial-alluvial soils.

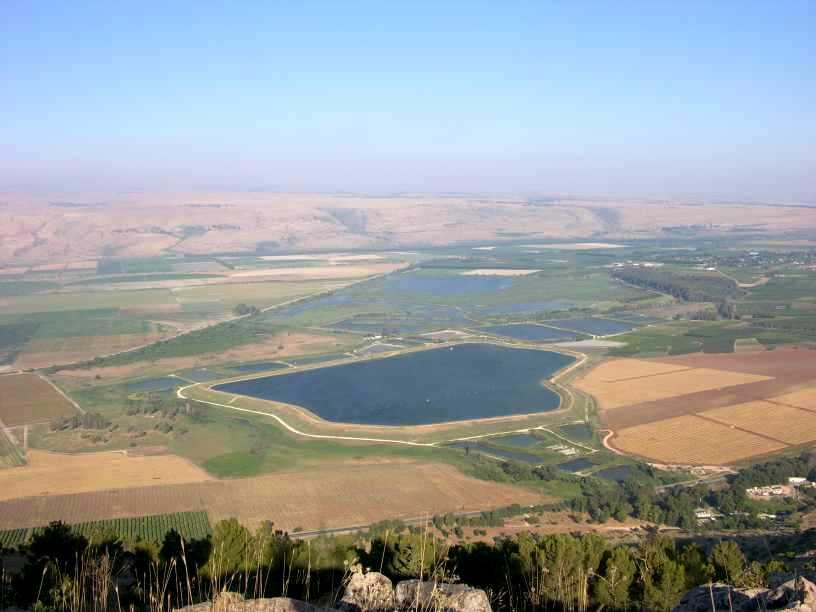
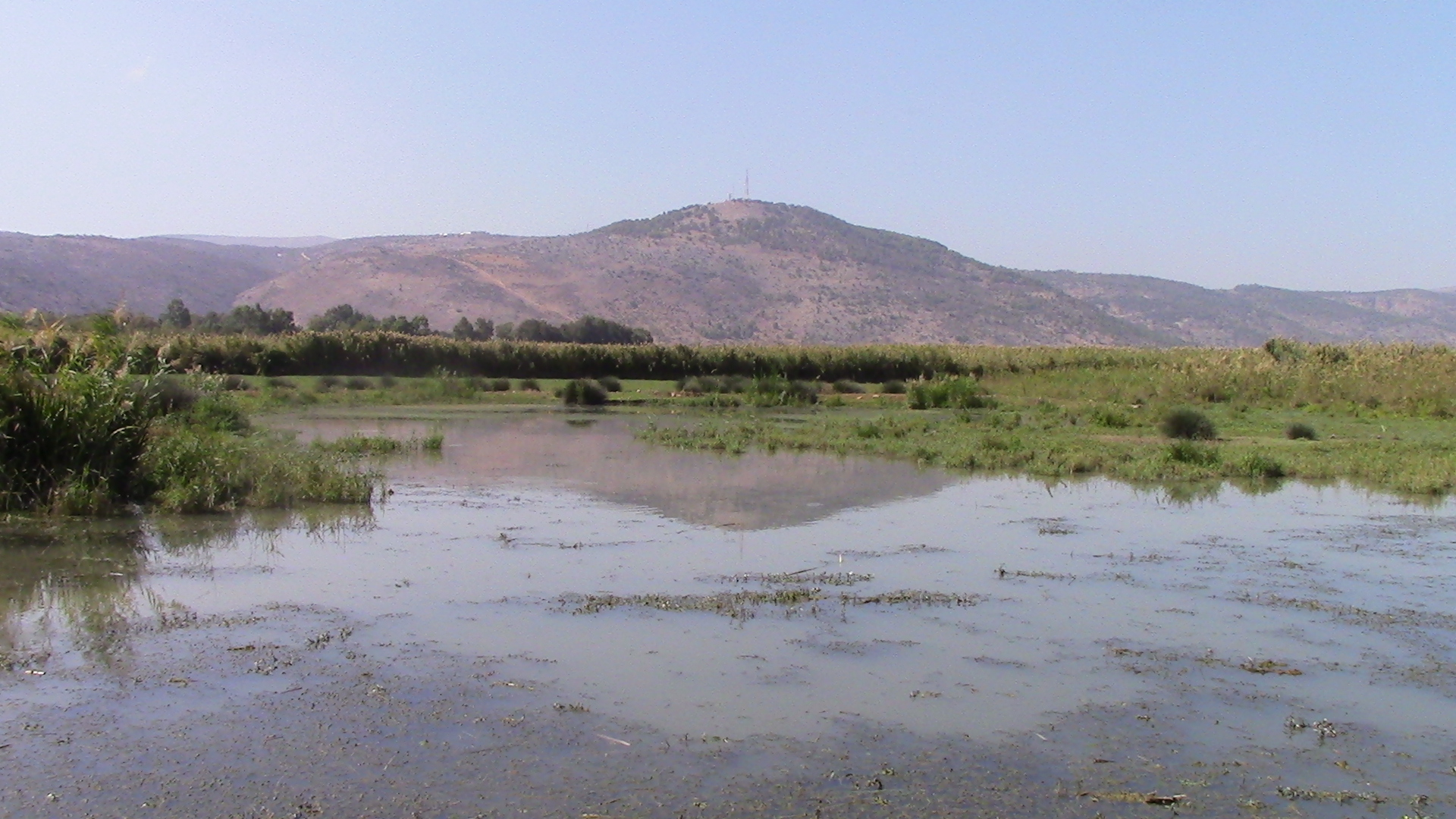
The Hula National Reserve at the beginning of the 21st century

In 2018, the population of potentially reproducing adults was estimated to be 234-235 individuals.

In 2023 a breeding group was moved to The Tisch Family Zoological Gardens in Jerusalem and in 2026 the zoo bred this species for the first time. Today this is the only zoo in the world that keep this unique species.

== See also ==
- Wildlife of Israel
