= List of amphibians of Morocco =

This is a list of amphibians found in Morocco. 12 amphibian species are recorded in Morocco.

== Species list ==
Common name	Species and authority	Native range	Status (IUCN), population trend	Image
Iberian ribbed newt	Pleurodeles waltl (Michahelles, 1830)	Spain, Portugal, and Morocco	Decreasing	Pleurodeles waltl
North African fire salamander	Salamandra algira (Bedriaga, 1883)	Morocco and Algeria	Decreasing	Salamandra algira
Brongersma's toad	Bufo brongersmai (Hoogmoed, 1972)	Endemic of Morocco	Decreasing	Bufo brongersmai
Common toad	Bufo bufo (Linnaeus, 1758)	In Europe, Kazakhstan, Syria, Morocco, Algeria, and Tunisia	Stable	Bufo bufo
Mediterranean tree frog	Hyla meridionalis (Boettger, 1874)	In Spain, Portugal, France, Italy, Monaco, Morocco, Algeria, and Tunisia	Stable	Hyla meridionalis
Pelobates varaldii	Pelobates varaldii (Pasteur & Bons, 1959)	Endemic of Morocco	Decreasing	
Berber toad	Sclerophrys mauritanica (Schlegel, 1841)	In Spain, Morocco, Algeria, and Tunisia	Stable	Sclerophrys mauritanica
Crowned bullfrog	Hoplobatrachus occipitalis (Günther, 1858)	In West Africa, Central Africa, Tanzania, Kenya, Uganda, Ethiopia, Sudan, South Sudan, Libya, Morocco, and Algeria	Stable	Hoplobatrachus occipitalis
Discoglossus scovazzi	Discoglossus scovazzi (Camerano, 1878)	In Spain and Morocco	Stable	Discoglossus scovazzi
African green toad	Bufotes boulengeri (Lataste, 1879)	In Spain, Morocco, Algeria, Egypt, Libya, Tunisia, Israel, Jordan, Saudi Arabia, and Italy	Trend unknown	Bufotes boulengeri
Sahara frog	Pelophylax saharicus (Boulenger, 1913)	In Egypt and Algeria, Libya, Morocco, Spain, Tunisia, and Spain	Stable	Pelophylax saharicus
Alytes maurus	Alytes maurus (Pasteur & Bons, 1962)	In Morocco and Spain	Stable	Alytes maurus

== See also ==
- List of amphibians of India
