= Aralobatrachus =

Aralobatrachus Temporal range: Late Cretaceous, 94.3–85.8 Ma

Scientific classification
- Kingdom: Animalia
- Phylum: Chordata
- Class: Amphibia
- Order: Anura
- Family: Alytidae
- Genus: †Aralobatrachus; Nesov, 1981

Type species
- † Aralobatrachus robustus Nesov, 1981

Extinct genus of amphibians

Aralobatrachus is an extinct genus of frog belonging to the family Alytidae. It lived in Uzbekistan during the Late Cretaceous period around 94.3-85.8 million years ago.

== See also ==
- List of prehistoric amphibians
