= Bakonybatrachus =

Bakonybatrachus Temporal range: Late Cretaceous, Santonian

Scientific classification
- Kingdom: Animalia
- Phylum: Chordata
- Class: Amphibia
- Order: Anura
- Family: Discoglossidae
- Genus: †Bakonybatrachus; Szentesi & Venczel, 2012
- Species: †B. fedori

Binomial name
- †Bakonybatrachus fedori Szentesi & Venczel, 2012

Extinct genus of amphibians

Bakonybatrachus is an extinct genus of discoglossine discoglossid frog known from northwestern Hungary.

== Description ==
Bakonybatrachus is known from the holotype MTM V 2010.283.1, a well preserved right ilium and from some referred isolated bones, including MTM V 2009.34.1, right maxilla, MTM V 2008.31.1, left angulospenial, and MTM V 2008.30.1, left scapula. All specimens were collected in Iharkút locality from the Csehbánya Formation in the Bakony Mountains, dating to the Santonian stage of the Late Cretaceous. The ilium suggest that Bakonybatrachus was a good jumper and swimmer.

== Etymology ==
Bakonybatrachus was first named by Zoltán Szentesi and Márton Venczel in 2012 and the type species is Bakonybatrachus fedori. The generic name is derived from Bakony Mountains, in which the specimens were found, and Greek batrachus, "frog".
