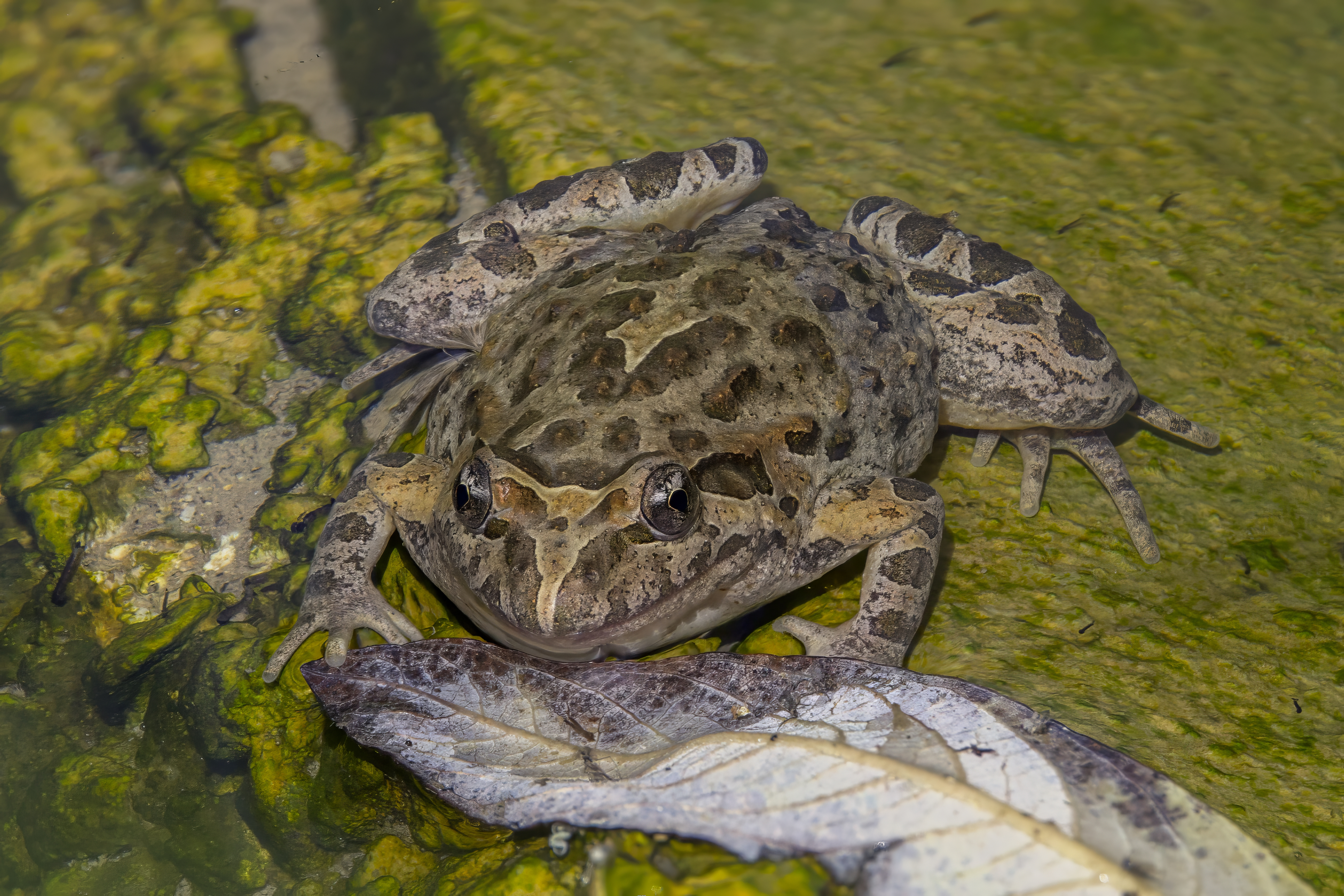
- In Malta

Conservation status
- Least Concern (IUCN 3.1)

Scientific classification
- Kingdom: Animalia
- Phylum: Chordata
- Class: Amphibia
- Order: Anura
- Family: Alytidae
- Genus: Discoglossus
- Species: D. pictus

Binomial name
- Discoglossus pictus Otth, 1837
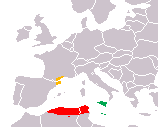
- Green, D. p. pictus; red, D. p. auritus (native); orange, D.p. auritus (introduced)

= Discoglossus pictus =

Species of amphibian

Discoglossus pictus, the Mediterranean painted frog or simply painted frog, is a species of frog in the family Alytidae (formerly Discoglossidae).

== Distribution ==
Discoglossus pictus is found Mediterranean Africa in northeast Morocco, northern Algeria, and Tunisia, in the islands of Sicily (Italy) and Malta; introduced populations exist in northeastern Spain and southwestern France. Discoglossus scovazzi from Morocco was previously considered a subspecies of D. pictus. Initially, only the former was thought to occur in Morocco, but later research has shown that also D. pictus is present there.

== Description ==
As the common name implies, these frogs can have colorful markings. Three pattern variations occur in this species - almost uniformly colored animals, animals with large, dark spots with bright edges, and animals with two dark brown longitudinal bands, one bright band along the back, and two bright bands along the sides. The belly is whitish. The body is stout with a flat head that is wider than it is long. The dorsal glands are arranged in longitudinal patterns along the back, or can be absent. The pupils are shaped like an upside-down droplet. Mating in North Morocco takes place from January to early November. Copulation, in which the male clasps the female in the lumbar region, lasts about two hours. Copulation in the Spanish specimens lasts only 35 seconds to 2 minutes. Females lay 500 to 1000 eggs in one night. The females copulate with various males and after each copulation, a small clump of about 20 to 50 eggs is laid. The ovum diameter is usually 1.0 to 1.5 mm; the gelatinous envelope is 3.7 mm. The eggs have no common envelope and form a loose mass on the water surface or may sink to the bottom. Eggs usually hatch in 2–6 days. Upon hatching, tadpoles are about 3 mm in length. In 1–3 months, they grow to about 33 mm and metamorphose into froglets of 10 mm. In Sicily, many populations are associated with man-made water bodies such as stone-sided cisterns, irrigation pipes, and canals in cultivated areas.

== Habitat and conservation ==
It is on the list of Strictly Protected Fauna of the Council of Europe (Bern Convention). They appear to be endangered by the intensification of agriculture, but populations that live along rivers, seasonal ponds, and swamps seem to be less endangered. Populations from northeast of the Iberian Peninsula could be a threat to some native species of frogs, especially those where they both occur in the same aquatic habitats. In North Africa, it is a very abundant species, especially in the subhumid northern regions, but its presence reaches pre-Saharan oases. Populations on Malta are said to be threatened by a reduction of the ground-water levels. It was introduced several times on the island of Comino, but the introduced Levant water frog (Pelophylax bedriagae) on the Maltese archipelago is a direct competitor of this species. To effectively protect this species, more data are needed about its ecology and biology. D. pictus seems to be associated with man-made water bodies, at least for part of its distribution.
