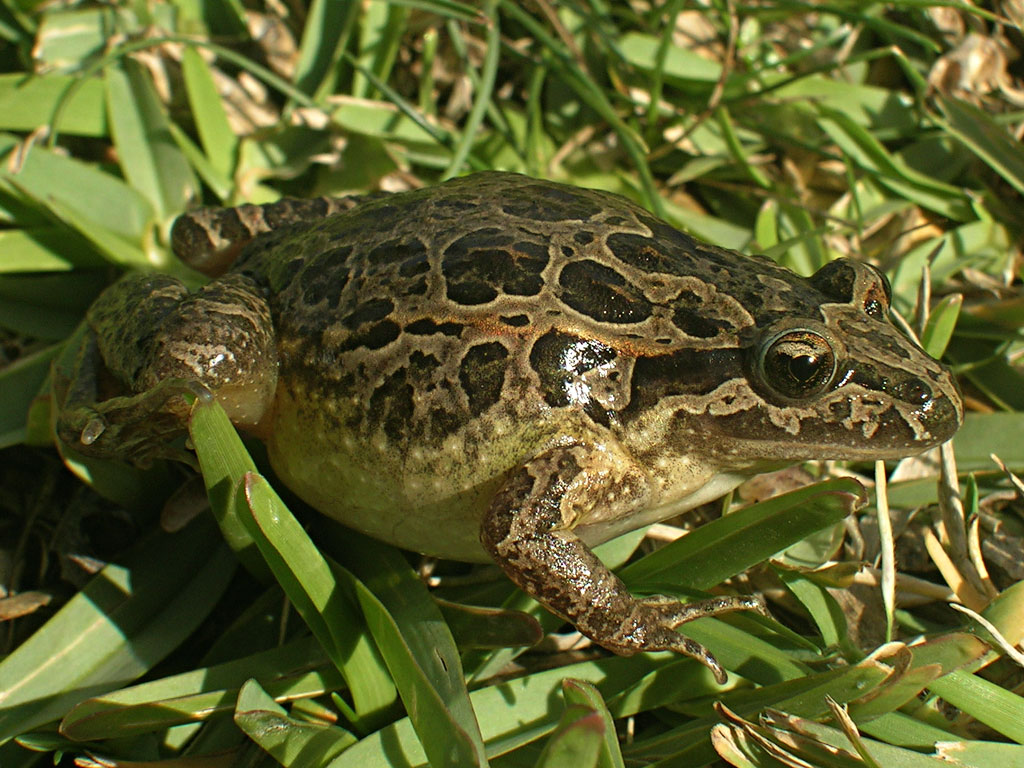
- Discoglossus galganoi

Scientific classification
- Kingdom: Animalia
- Phylum: Chordata
- Class: Amphibia
- Order: Anura
- Family: Alytidae
- Genus: Discoglossus; Otth, 1837

Type species
- Discoglossus pictus Otth, 1837

Species
- 6 or 7, see text
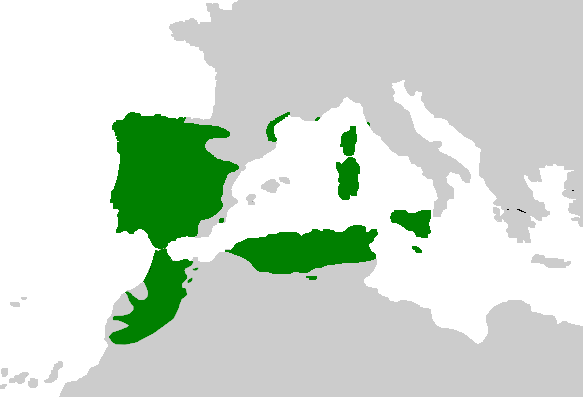
- Distribution of Discoglossus (in green)

= Discoglossus =

Genus of amphibians

Discoglossus (common name: painted frogs) is a genus of frogs in the family Alytidae (formerly Discoglossidae) found in southern Europe and northwestern Africa.

== Species ==
Six species are placed in this genus. The Hula painted frog (Latonia nigriventer) was included in this genus until further genetic analysis placed this frog in the genus Latonia.

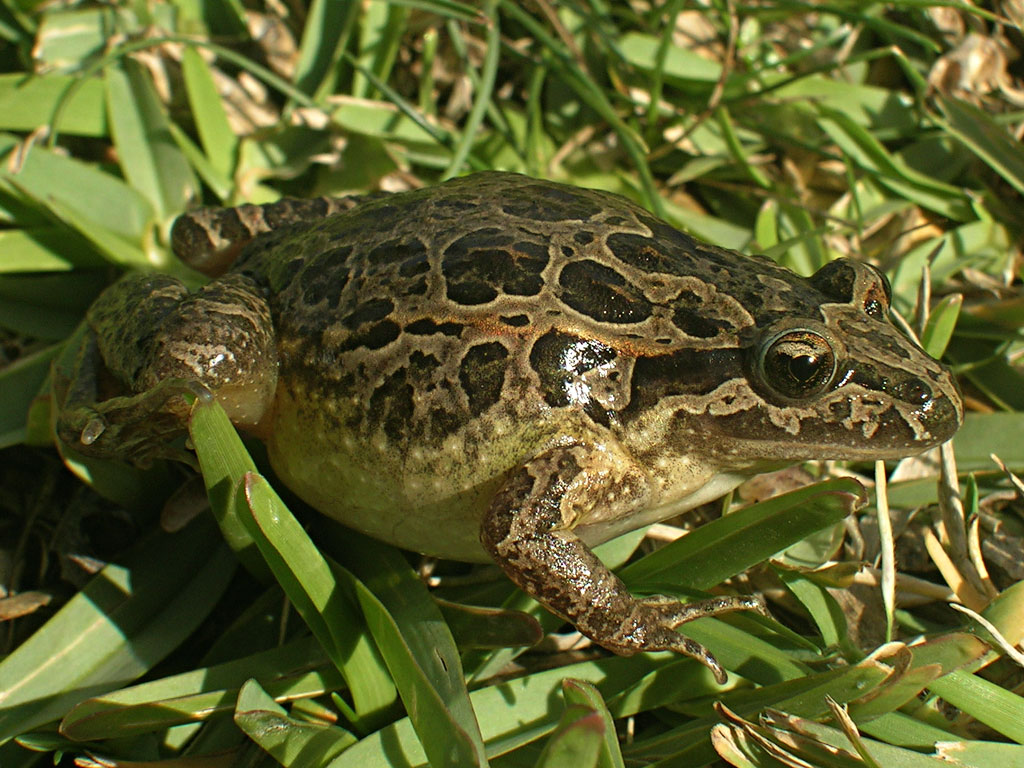
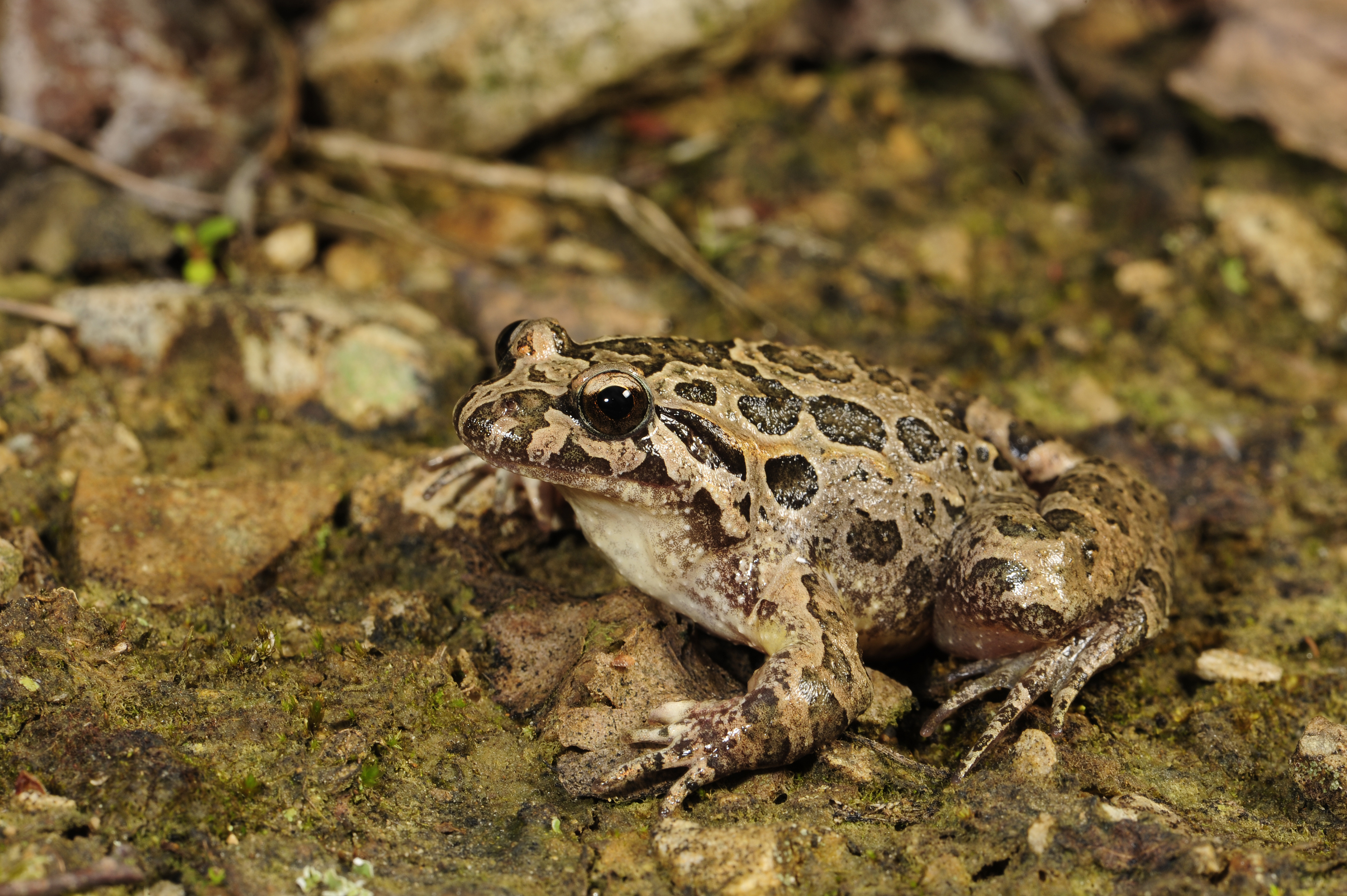
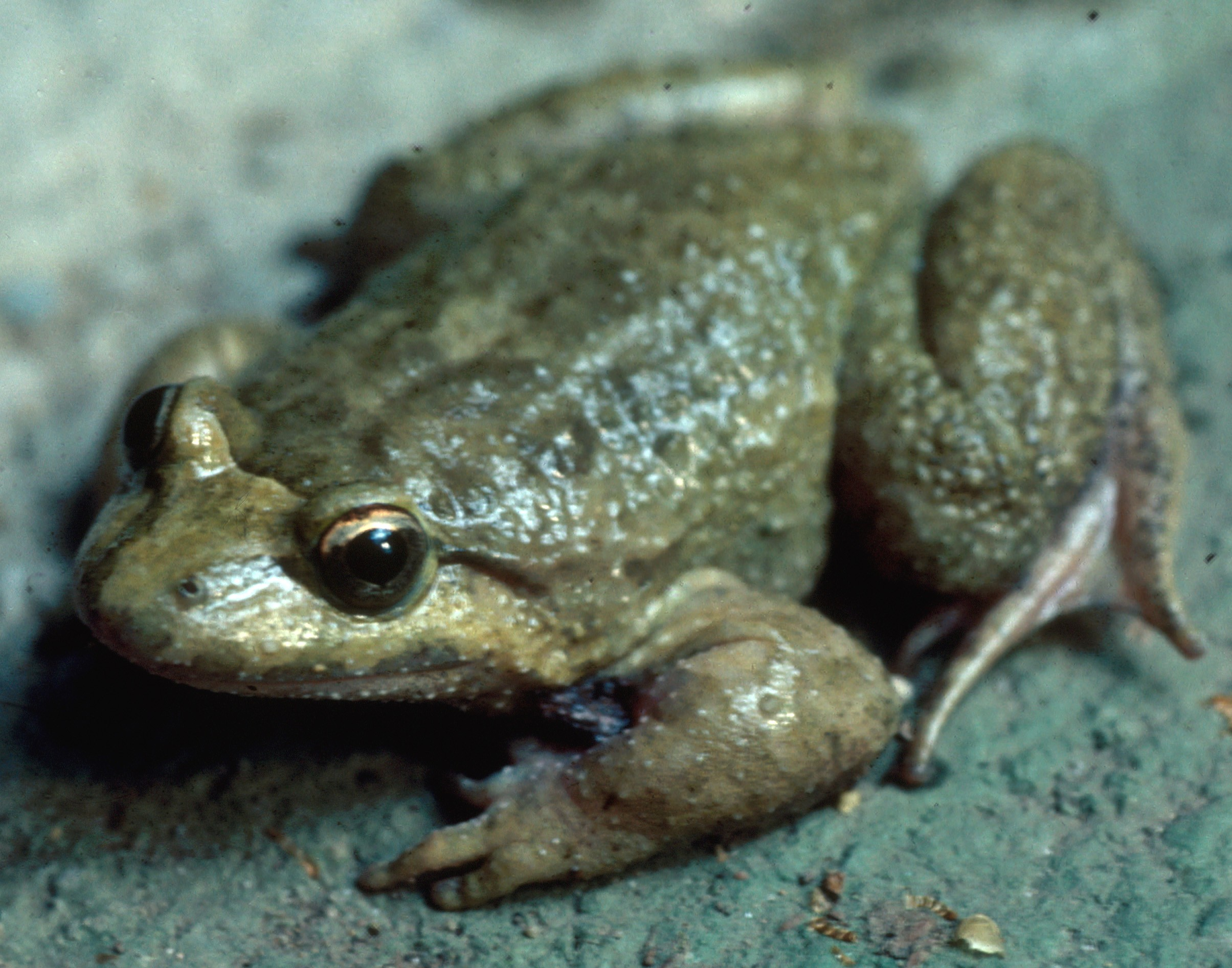
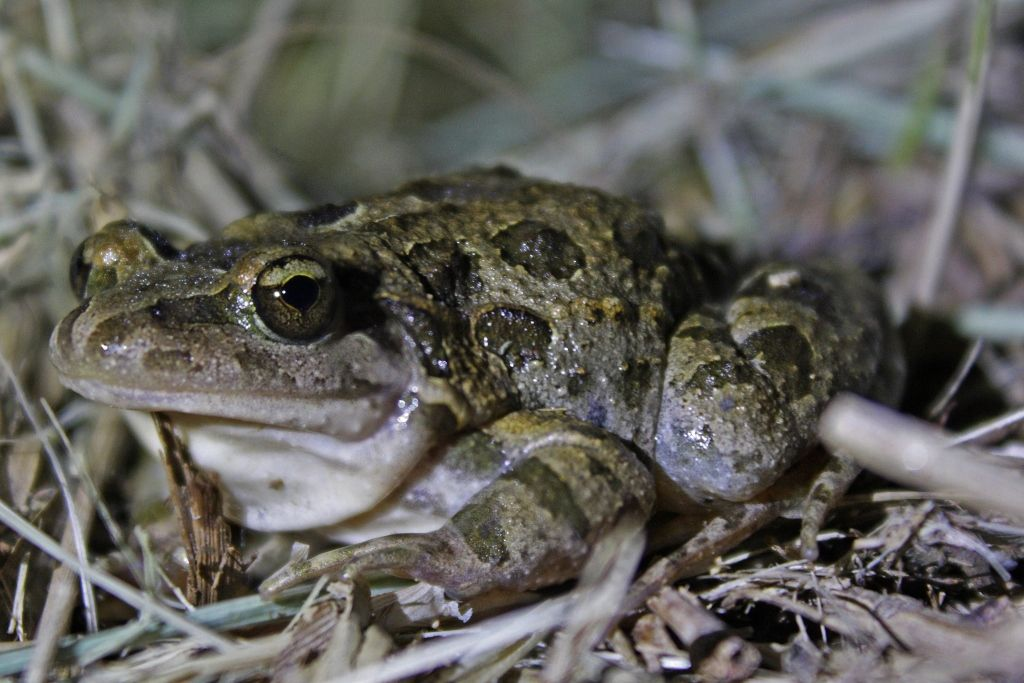
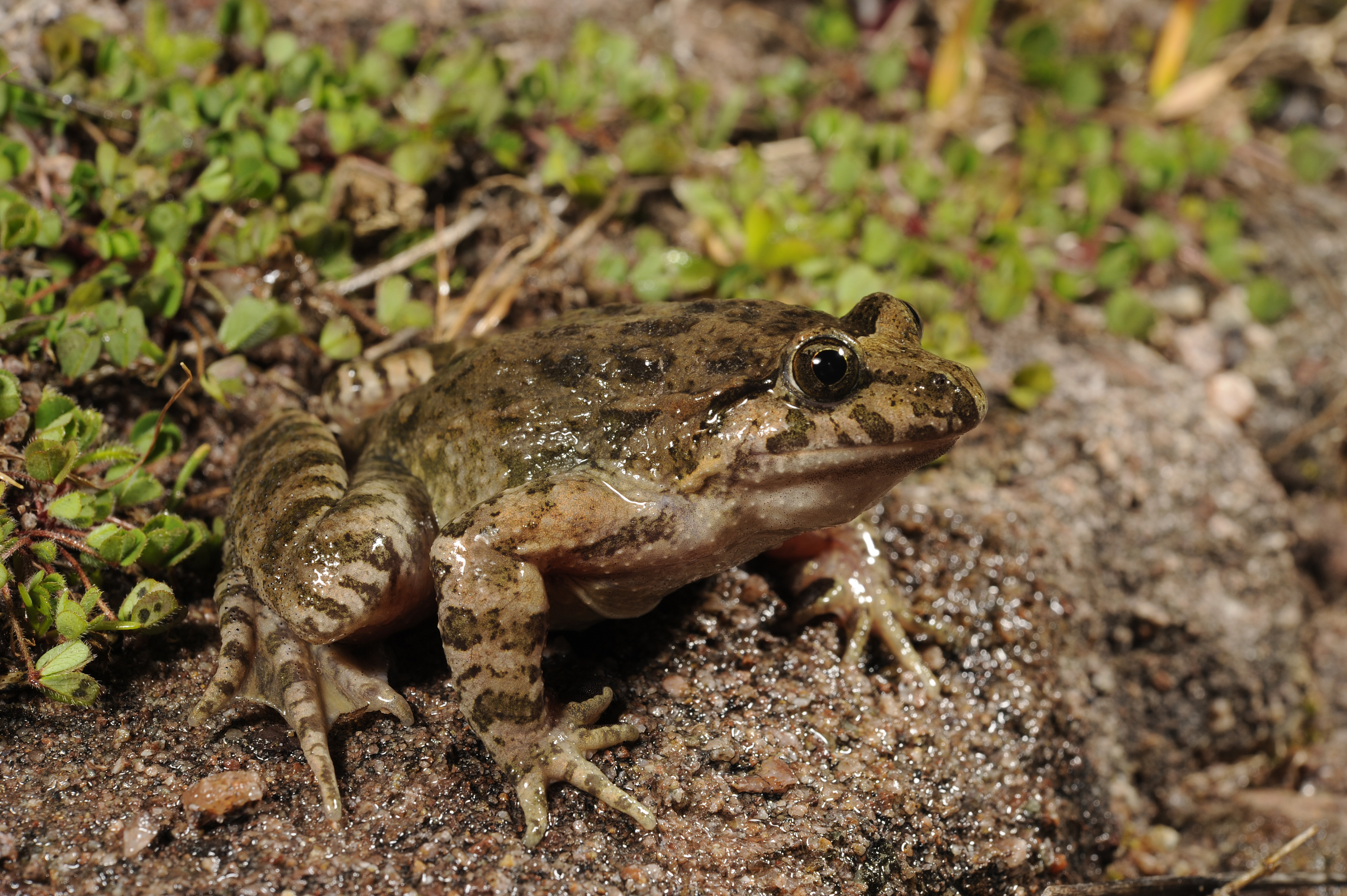
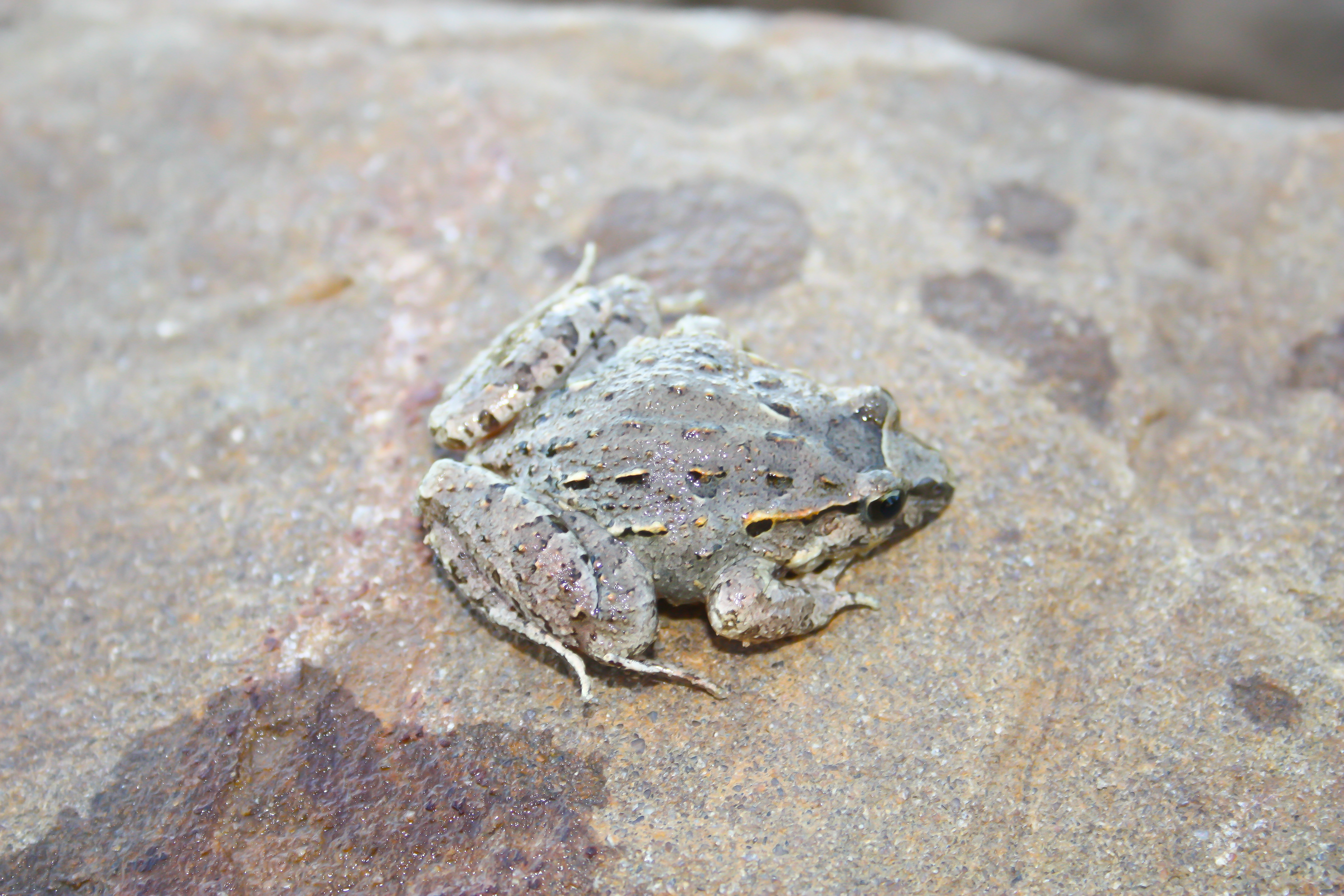
Image	Binomial name and author	Common name	Distribution
	Discoglossus galganoi Capula, Nascetti, Lanza, Bullini & Crespo, 1985	Iberian painted frog	Portugal and Spain
	Discoglossus jeanneae Busack, 1986	Spanish painted frog	Spain.
	Discoglossus montalentii Lanza, Nascetti, Capula, and Bullini, 1984	Corsican painted frog	Corsica.
	Discoglossus pictus Otth, 1837	Mediterranean painted frog	Mediterranean Africa in northeast Morocco, northern Algeria, and Tunisia, in the islands of Sicily (Italy) and Malta
	Discoglossus sardus Tschudi In Otth, 1837	Tyrrhenian painted frog	Sardinia, Corsica and the Tuscan Archipelago.
	Discoglossus scovazzi Camerano, 1878	Moroccan painted frog	Morocco as well as in the Spanish North African enclaves Ceuta and Melilla.
