= Carl Adolf Otth =

Swiss physician and naturalist (1803–1839)

Carl Adolf (Adolphe) Otth (April 2, 1803, Bern - May 16, 1839) was a Swiss medical doctor and naturalist. He was the brother of mycologist Gustav Heinrich Otth (1806-1874).

In 1822 he studied medicine in Bern, and afterwards attended classes on natural history in Geneva, where he had as instructors, Augustin Pyramus de Candolle (1778-1841) and Nicolas Charles Seringe (1776-1858). He later studied medicine at the Universities of Kiel and Berlin, where in 1828 he received his doctorate. After six months in Paris, he returned to Bern.

In 1836 as a naturalist, he journeyed to Dauphiné and Provence in France, to the Balearic Islands and also to Algeria. From these travels he collected a large number of insect, reptile and amphibian species. In 1837 he was the first to describe the frog genus Discoglossus based on studies of the Mediterranean painted frog (Discoglossus pictus).

In 1838 he published a book with thirty lithographs based on a trip to Algiers, titled Esquisses africaines, dessinées pendant un voyage a Alger et lithographiées par Adolphe Otth. In 1839 during a journey to the Middle East, he died in Jerusalem at the age of 36.
