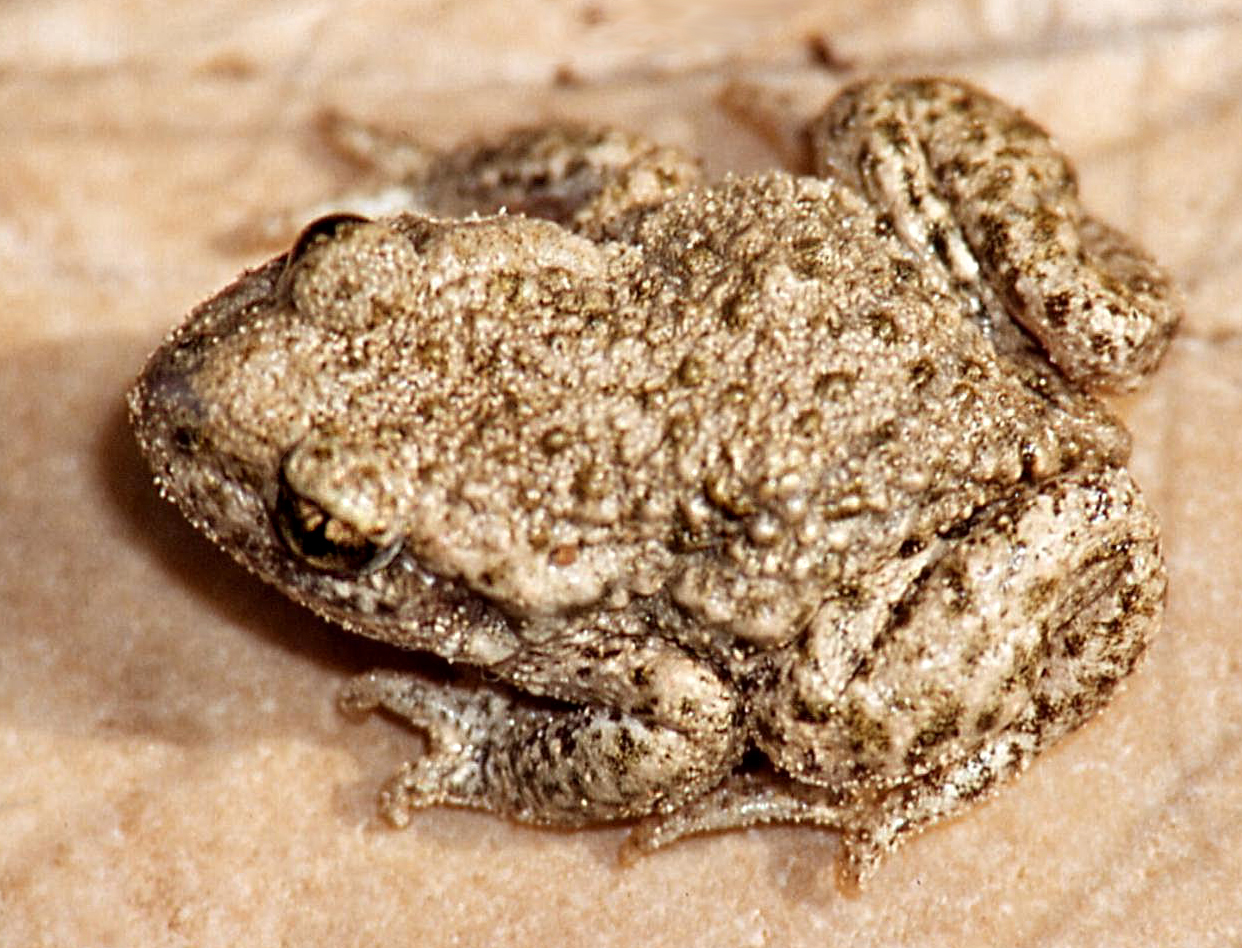
- Alytes obstetricans

Scientific classification
- Kingdom: Animalia
- Phylum: Chordata
- Class: Amphibia
- Order: Anura
- Suborder: Archaeobatrachia
- Family: Alytidae; Fitzinger, 1843

Genera
- Genus Alytes; Genus Discoglossus; Genus Latonia
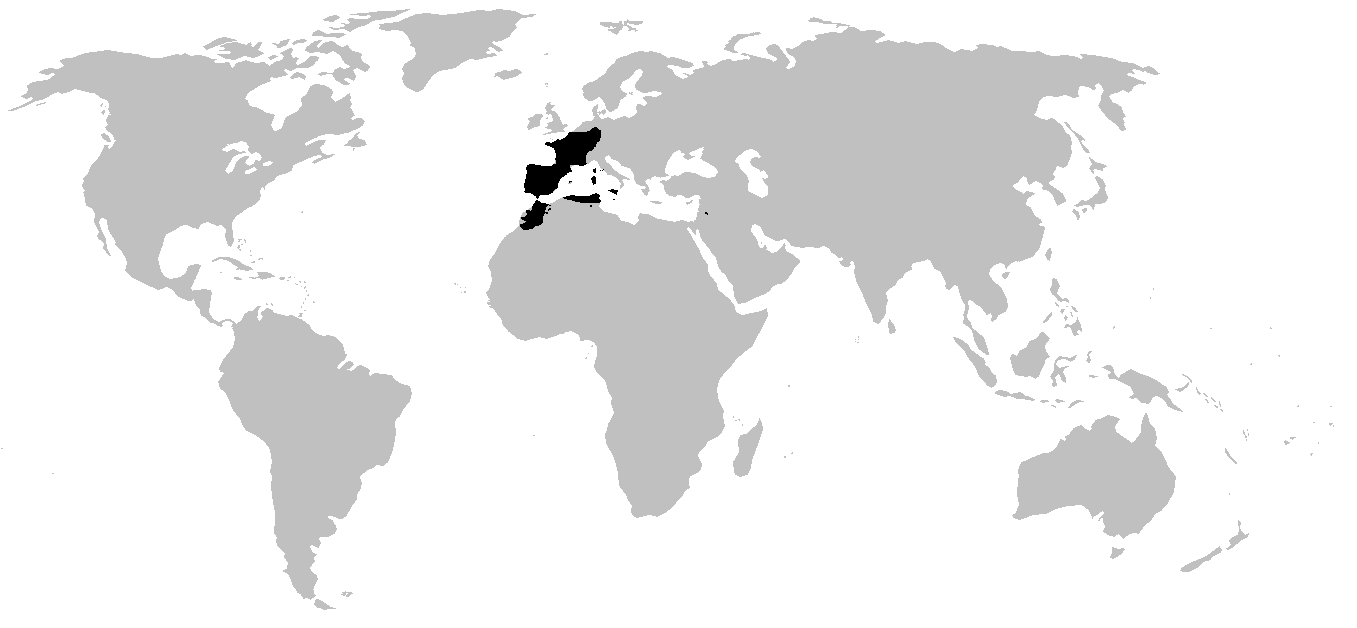
- Distribution of Discoglossidae (in black)

Synonyms
- Discoglossidae Günther, 1859

= Alytidae =

Alytidae Temporal range: Late Jurassic to Recent

Family of amphibians

The Alytidae are a family of primitive frogs. Their common name is painted frogs or midwife toads. Most are endemic to Europe, but three species occur in northwest Africa, and a species formerly thought to be extinct is found in Israel.

This family is also known as Discoglossidae, but the older name Alytidae has priority and is now recognized by major reference works. Some researchers, though, suggest that Alytes and Discoglossus are different enough to be treated as belonging to separate families, implying resurrection of the Discoglossidae. The term "discoglossid" has also been used to refer to many primitive fossil frogs that share plesiomorphic (ancestral) similities to alytids, but that are probably not closely related.

== Genera and species ==
The family contains three extant genera, Alytes, Discoglossus, and Latonia. The first is somewhat toad-like and can often be found on land. The second is smoother and more frog-like, preferring the water. The third genus was until recently considered extinct, and is represented by the recently rediscovered Hula painted frog. All of the species have pond-dwelling tadpoles.

The genera Bombina and Barbourula also used to be under this family, but have now been moved to the Bombinatoridae.

=== Extant genera ===
Image	Genus	Species
	Alytes Wagler, 1830	Alytes cisternasii - Iberian midwife toad; Alytes dickhilleni - southern midwife toad; Alytes maurus - Moroccan midwife toad; Alytes muletensis - Majorcan midwife toad; Alytes obstetricans - common midwife toad
	Discoglossus Otth, 1837	Discoglossus galganoi - West Iberian painted frog; Discoglossus jeanneae - Spanish painted frog; Discoglossus montalentii - Corsican painted frog; Discoglossus pictus - common painted frog; Discoglossus sardus - Tyrrhenian painted frog; Discoglossus scovazzi - Moroccan painted frog
	Latonia Meyer, 1843	Latonia nigriventer - Hula painted frog; †Latonia seyfriedi; †Latonia gigantea; †Latonia vertaizoni; †Latonia ragei

=== Extinct genera ===
Family Alytidae

- Genus †Enneabatrachus (prehistoric)
  - †Enneabatrachus hechti
- Genus †Aralobatrachus (prehistoric)
  - †Aralobatrachus robustus
- Genus †Callobatrachus (prehistoric)
  - †Callobatrachus sanyanensis
- Genus †Bakonybatrachus (prehistoric)
  - †Bakonybatrachus fedori
- Genus †Eodiscoglossus (prehistoric)
  - †Eodiscoglossus oxoniensis
  - †Eodiscoglossus santonjae
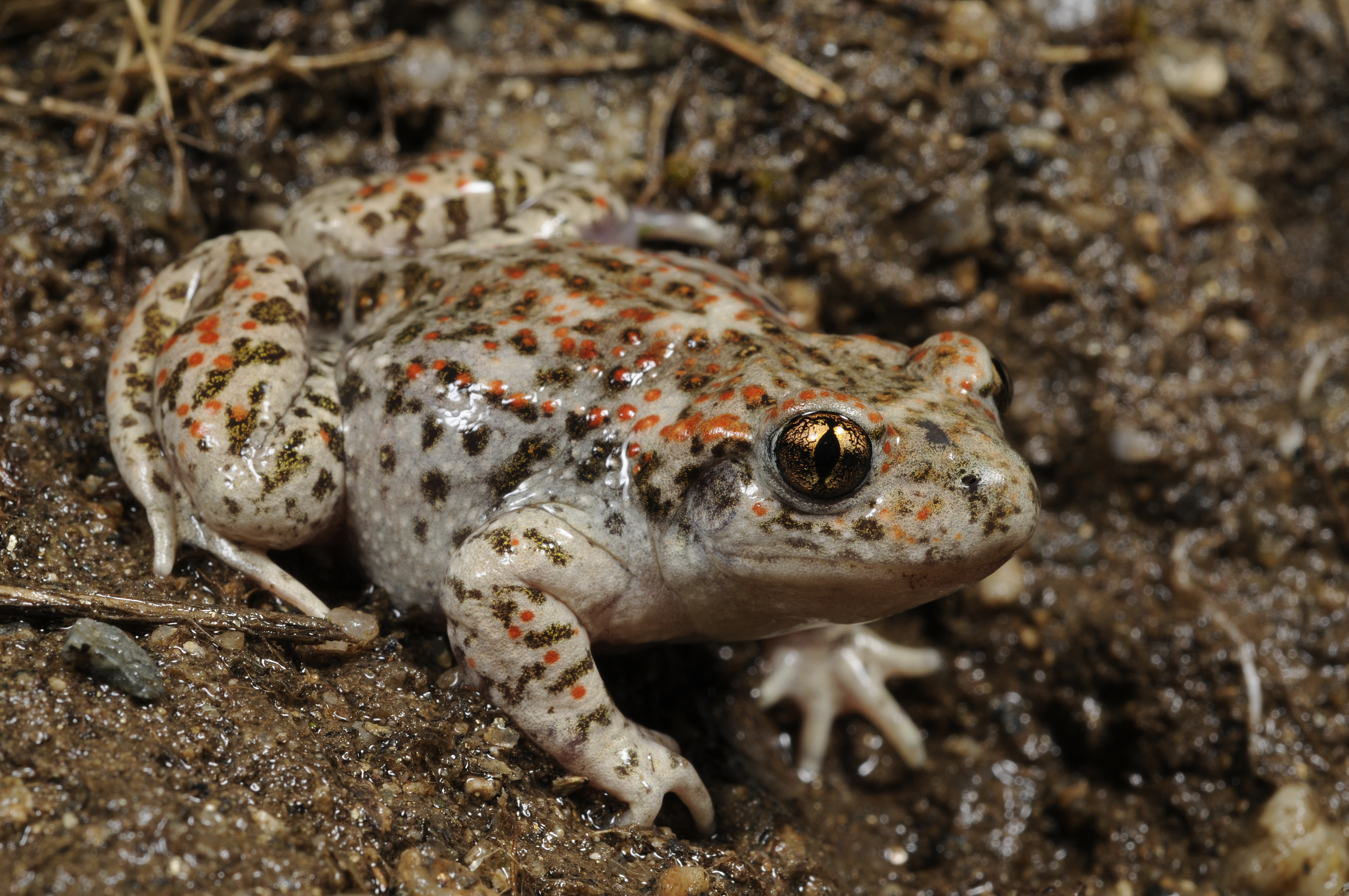
Iberian midwife toad (Alytes cisternasii)

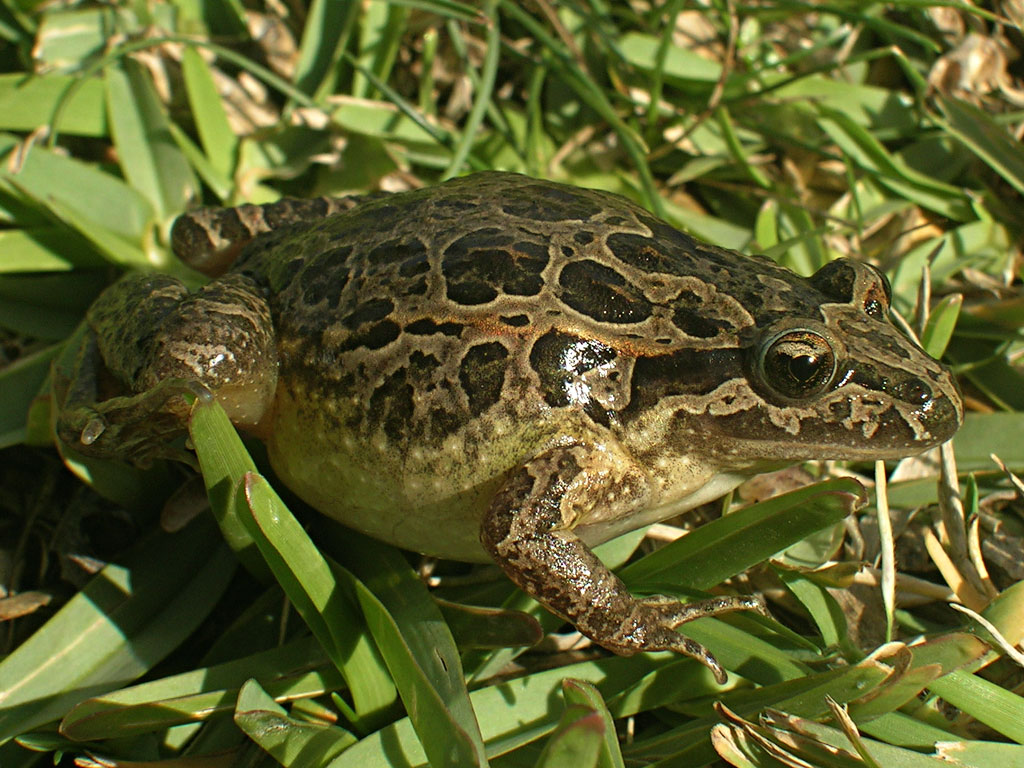
Iberian or Portuguese painted frog (Discoglossus galganoi)

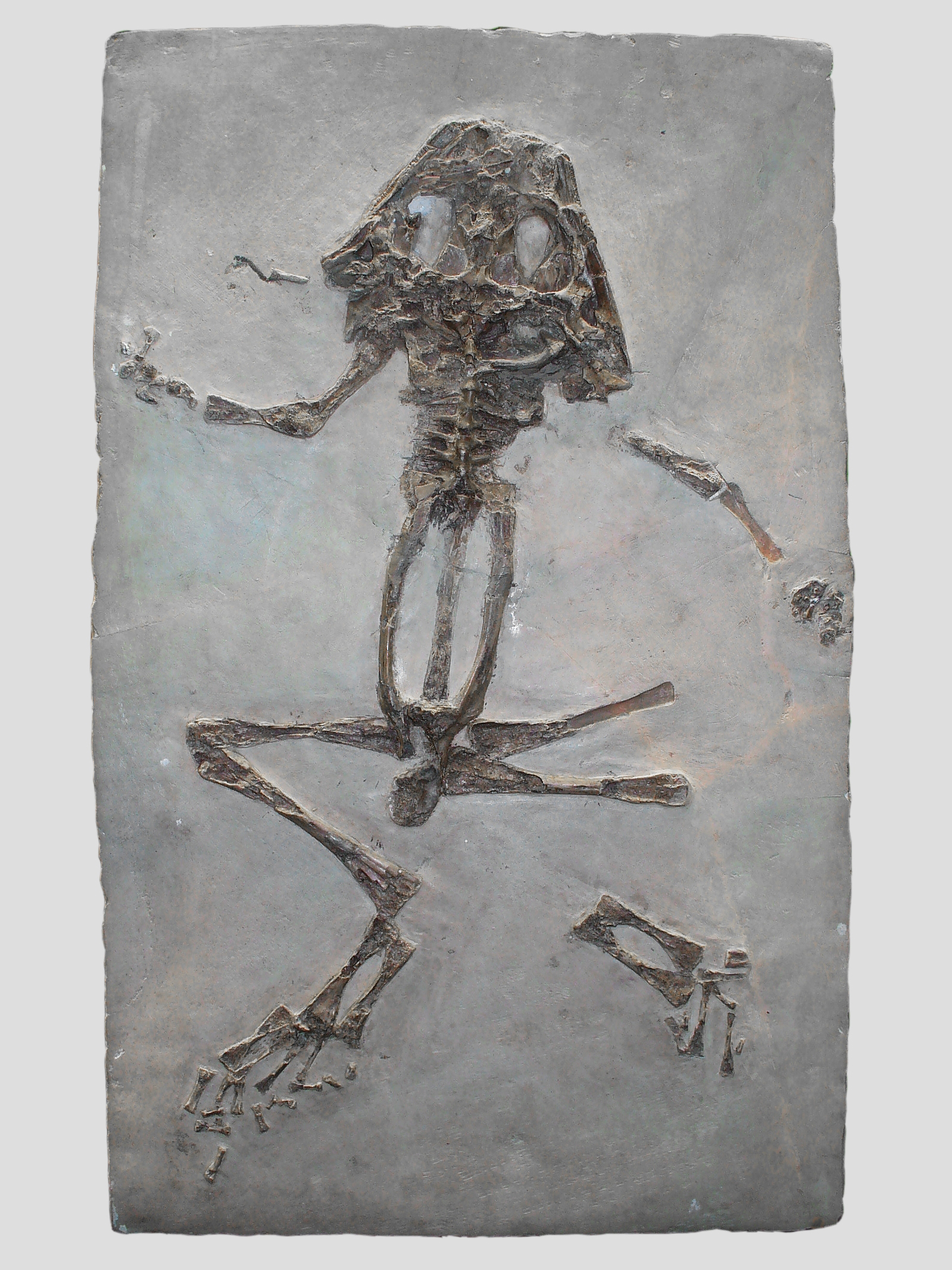
Fossil discoglossid from Miocene (†Latonia seyfriedi)
