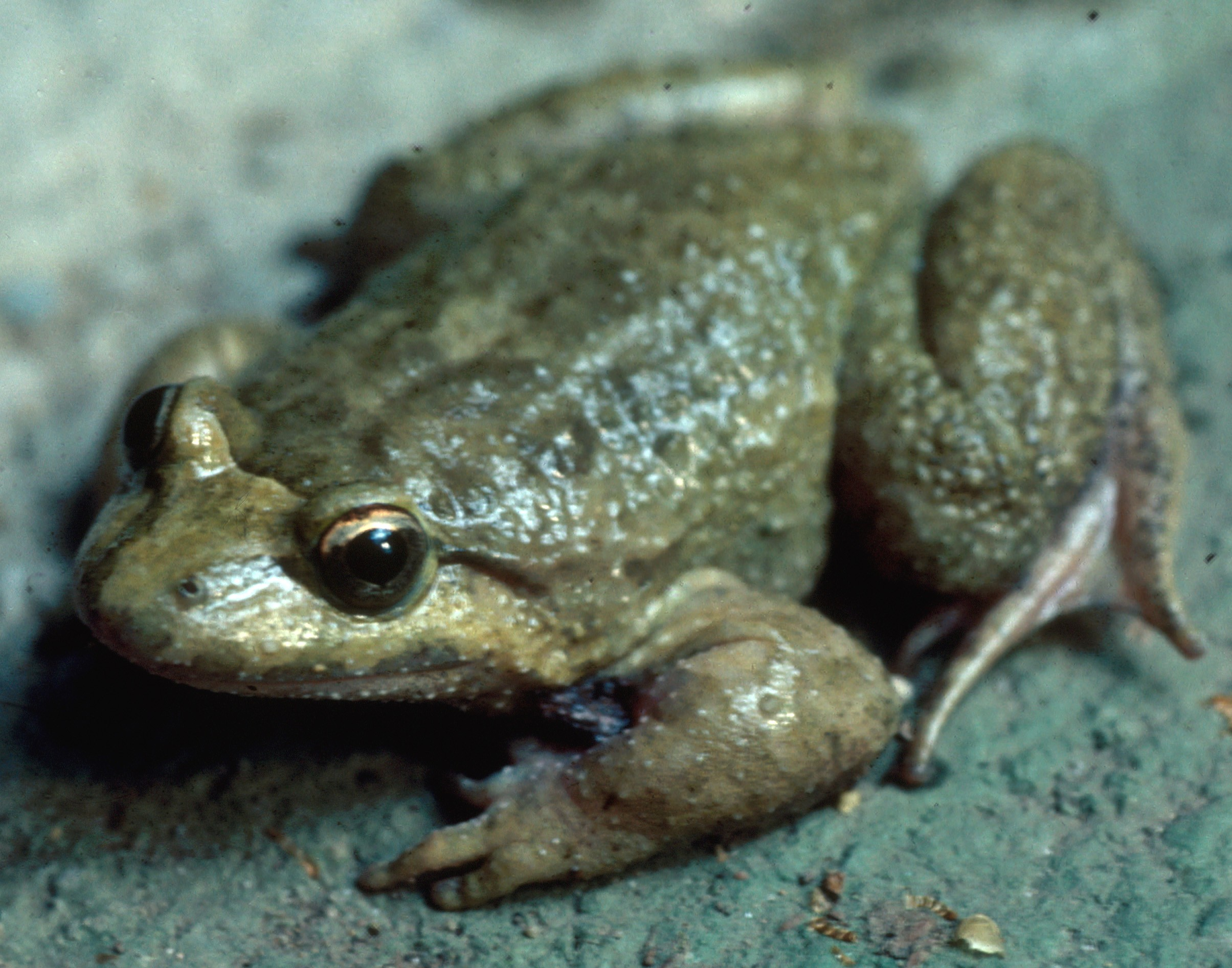

Conservation status
- Near Threatened (IUCN 3.1)

Scientific classification
- Kingdom: Animalia
- Phylum: Chordata
- Class: Amphibia
- Order: Anura
- Family: Alytidae
- Genus: Discoglossus
- Species: D. montalentii

Binomial name
- Discoglossus montalentii Lanza, Nascetti, Capula & Bullini, 1984

= Corsican painted frog =

Species of amphibian

The Corsican painted frog (Discoglossus montalentii) is a species of frogs in the family Alytidae (formerly Discoglossidae).

It is endemic to the French island of Corsica. Its natural habitats are temperate forests and rivers.

== Description ==
The Corsican painted frog is very similar in appearance to the Tyrrhenian painted frog but has a noticeably more rounded snout and a flatter back. The fourth finger of its front foot is tapering and not spatulate, and its hind legs are longer. It grows to about 6.5 centimetres (2.6 in) long. The colour varies and is either plain brown, grey or reddish brown, or one of these colours with dark brown spots. The underside is pale. The call is more musical than other painted frogs and consists of a repeated "poop – poop – poop".

== Distribution and habitat ==
The Corsican painted frog is found only on the island of Corsica. It mainly occurs in the central region at altitudes of 300 to 1,900 metres (980 to 6,230 ft), especially in mountain torrents and both still and flowing water in woods and forests. It shares its range with the Tyrrhenian painted frog ((Discoglossus sardus)) but is a more montane species, adept at leaping from rock to rock.

== Biology ==
Like other members of its family, the Corsican painted frog eats small invertebrates. It is unclear whether observations of this frog in the past were of D. sardus or D. montalentii. This is because they are so similar in appearance and were only recognised as different species in the late 20th century. Consequently, its reproductive habits are uncertain but it is believed to lay its eggs in small groups or singly on the bottom of watercourses. They are brownish-black and 1 to 1.5 millimetres (0.039 to 0.059 in) in diameter with a thick, gelatinous casing.
