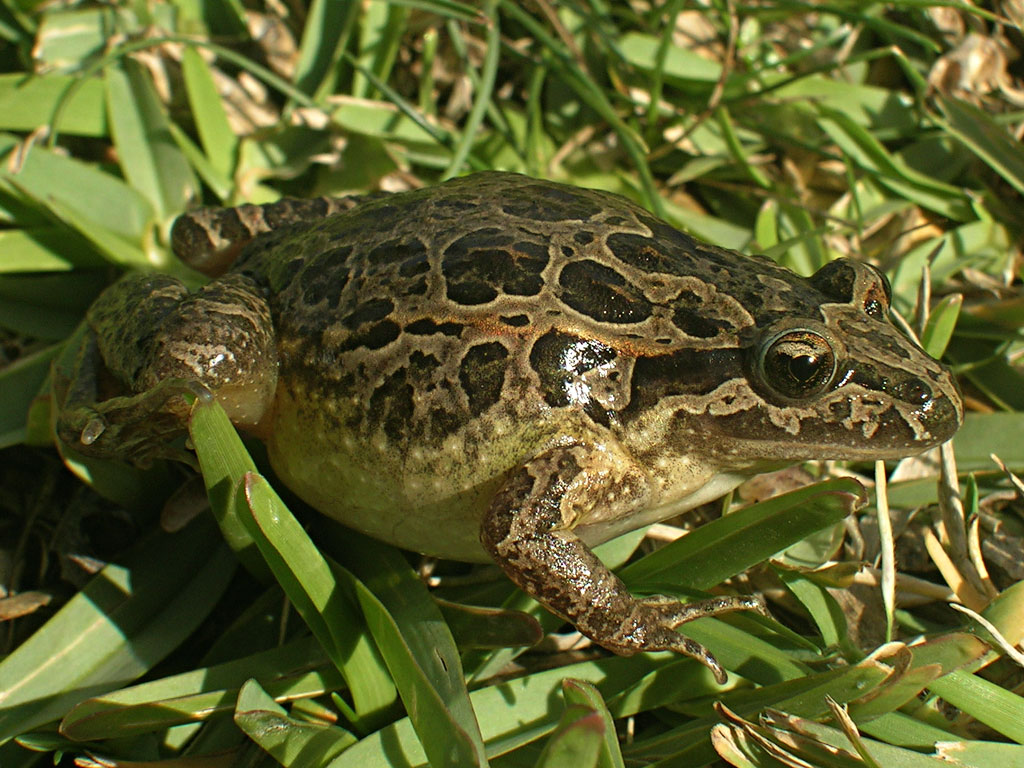

Conservation status
- Least Concern (IUCN 3.1)

Scientific classification
- Kingdom: Animalia
- Phylum: Chordata
- Class: Amphibia
- Order: Anura
- Family: Alytidae
- Genus: Discoglossus
- Species: D. galganoi

Binomial name
- Discoglossus galganoi Capula, Nascetti, Lanza, Bullini & Crespo, 1985
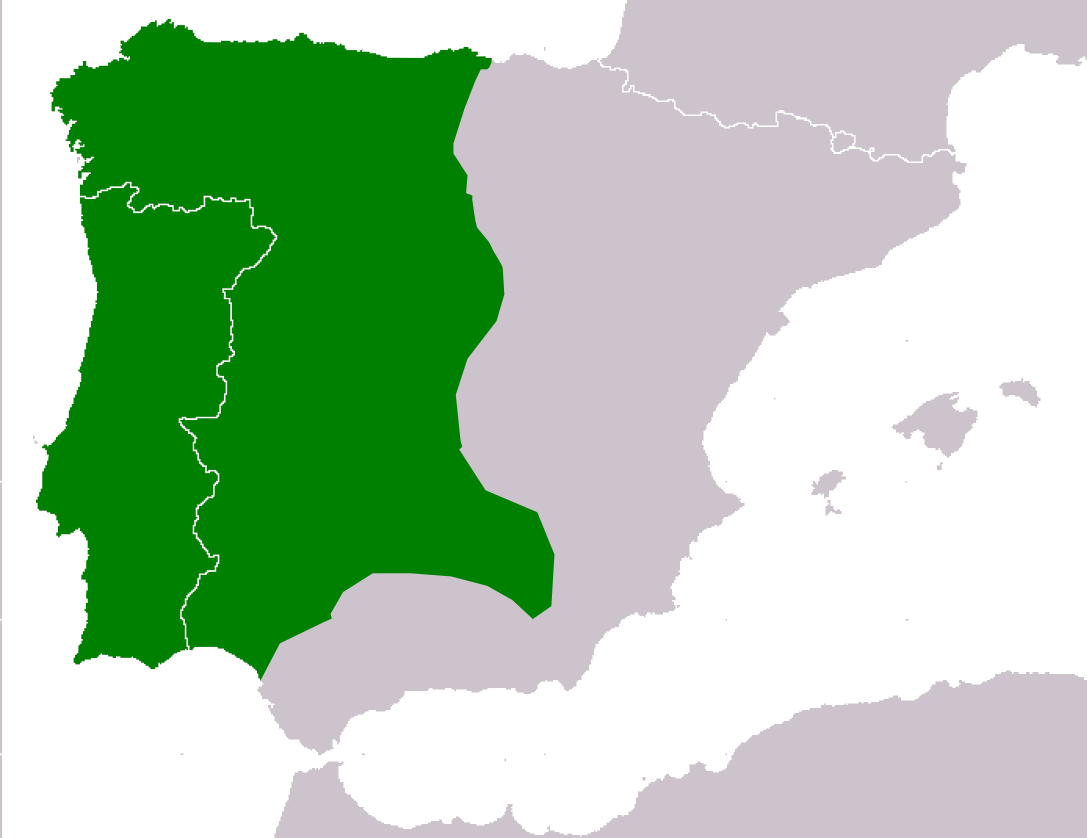

Synonyms
- Discoglossus hispanicus Lataste, 1879

= Iberian painted frog =

Species of amphibian

The Iberian painted frog (Discoglossus galganoi) is a species of frog in the family Alytidae (formerly Discoglossidae). It is found in Portugal and Spain, where its natural habitats are temperate forests, temperate shrubland, Mediterranean-type shrubby vegetation, rivers, intermittent rivers, swamps, freshwater marshes, intermittent freshwater marshes, sandy shores, arable land, and grassland. It is threatened by habitat loss.

== Description ==
This small frog has a broad head and stout body. It usually has longitudinal rows of warts on its back, but these are not present in all individuals. The pupils of the eyes are said to resemble an "upside-down droplet". This frog occurs in three different colour forms - a plain shade of greyish-brown, a pattern of large dark spots with pale rims, and a dorsal and two lateral bright bands on a dark background.

== Distribution and habitat ==
The Iberian painted frog is endemic to Spain and Portugal. It occurs at altitudes of up to 1,940 m (6,360 ft) and its typical habitats include open areas, rough grassland, thickets, woodland verges, swamps, and gulleys, usually in or near water.

== Biology ==
The breeding period usually lasts from October to December. Females mate several times and can produce as many as 5,000 eggs in several clutches during the season. The eggs are laid in water either singly or in small groups, on the bottom or attached to plants. They hatch after 2-6 days according to the temperature. The tadpoles undergo metamorphosis after between 22 and 60 days of development, and the juveniles are about 1 cm (0.4 in) long when they leave the water.

== Status ==
The Iberian painted frog is listed by the IUCN as being of least concern. It is common over most of its range and the number of individuals may be declining slowly, but the rate of loss is not sufficient to justify placing it in a more threatened category.
