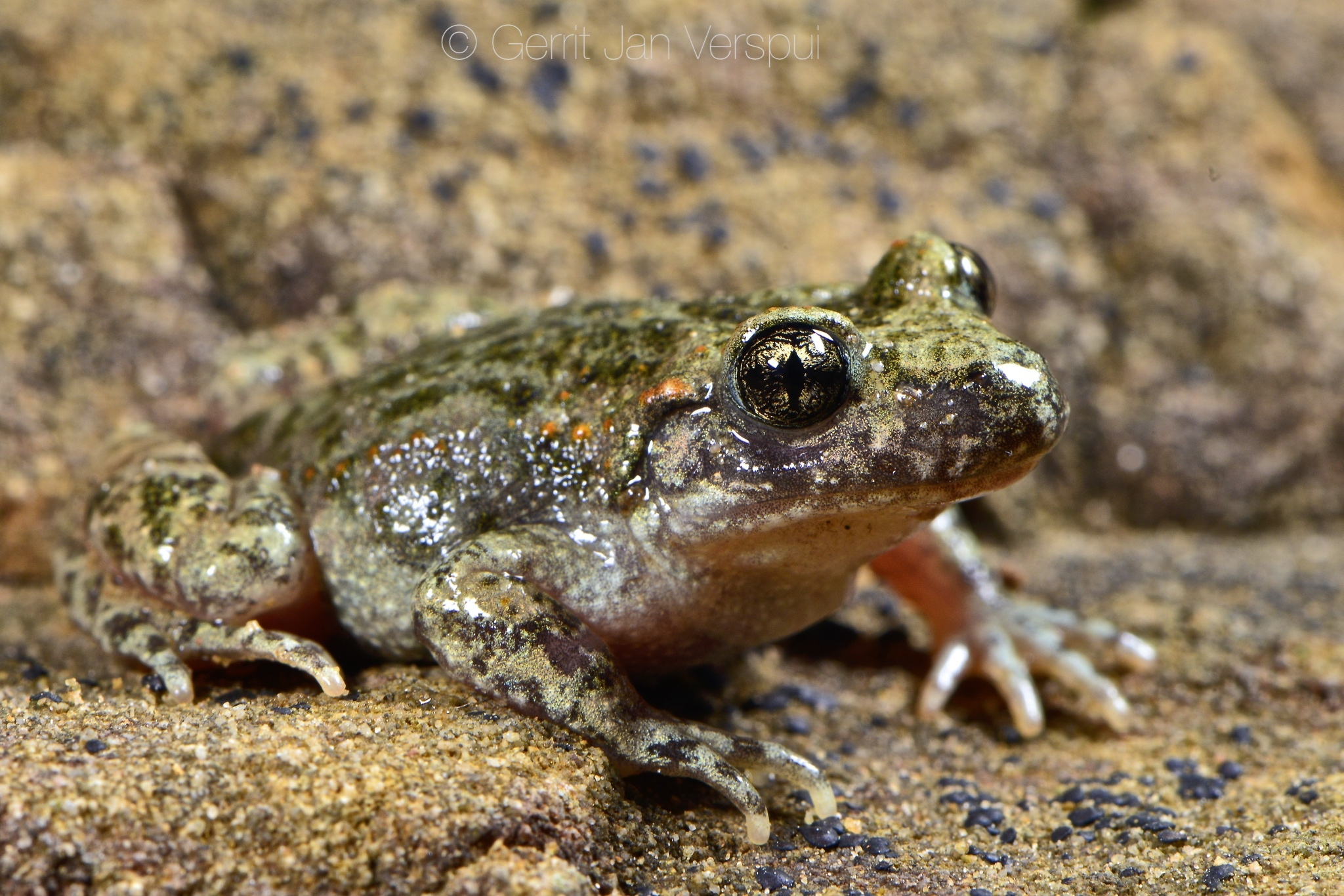

Conservation status
- Endangered (IUCN 3.1)

Scientific classification
- Kingdom: Animalia
- Phylum: Chordata
- Class: Amphibia
- Order: Anura
- Family: Alytidae
- Genus: Alytes
- Species: A. maurus

Binomial name
- Alytes maurus (Pasteur & Bons, 1962)
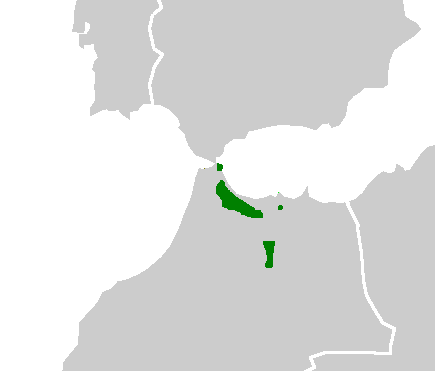

= Alytes maurus =

Species of frog

Alytes maurus, commonly known as the Moroccan midwife toad, is a species of frog in the family Alytidae. It is endemic to Morocco. Its natural habitats are temperate forests, Mediterranean-type shrubby vegetation, rivers, freshwater marshes, freshwater springs, rocky areas, and rural gardens. Phenomena such as habitat fragmentation, water pollution, climate change, and the introduction of chytrid fungus into ecosystems all pose threats to the well-being of these organisms.

== Sources ==
- Dietterich, Lee (2011). "Alytes maurus". African Amphibians.
- Escoriza, D.; Ben Hassine, J. (2019). Amphibians of North Africa. London: Elsevier. ISBN 978-0-12-815476-2.
- de Pous, P.; Metallinou, M.; Donaire-Barroso, D.; Carranza, S.; Sanuy, D. (2013). "Integrating mtDNA analyses and ecological niche modelling to infer the evolutionary history of Alytes maurus (Amphibia; Alytidae) from Morocco". Herpetological Journal. 23 (3): 153–160. hdl:10261/113242.
