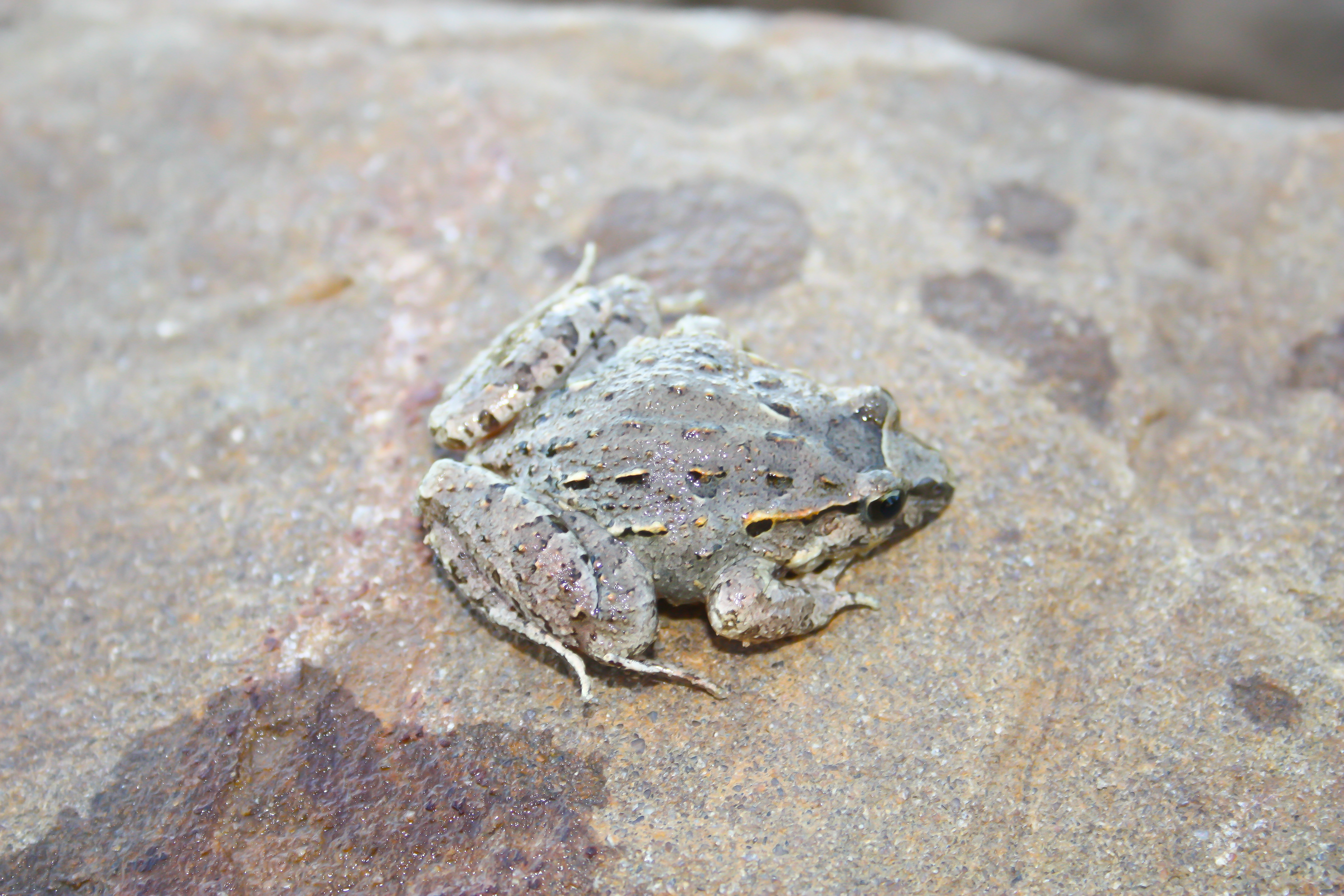

Conservation status
- Least Concern (IUCN 3.1)

Scientific classification
- Kingdom: Animalia
- Phylum: Chordata
- Class: Amphibia
- Order: Anura
- Family: Alytidae
- Genus: Discoglossus
- Species: D. scovazzi

Binomial name
- Discoglossus scovazzi Camerano, 1878
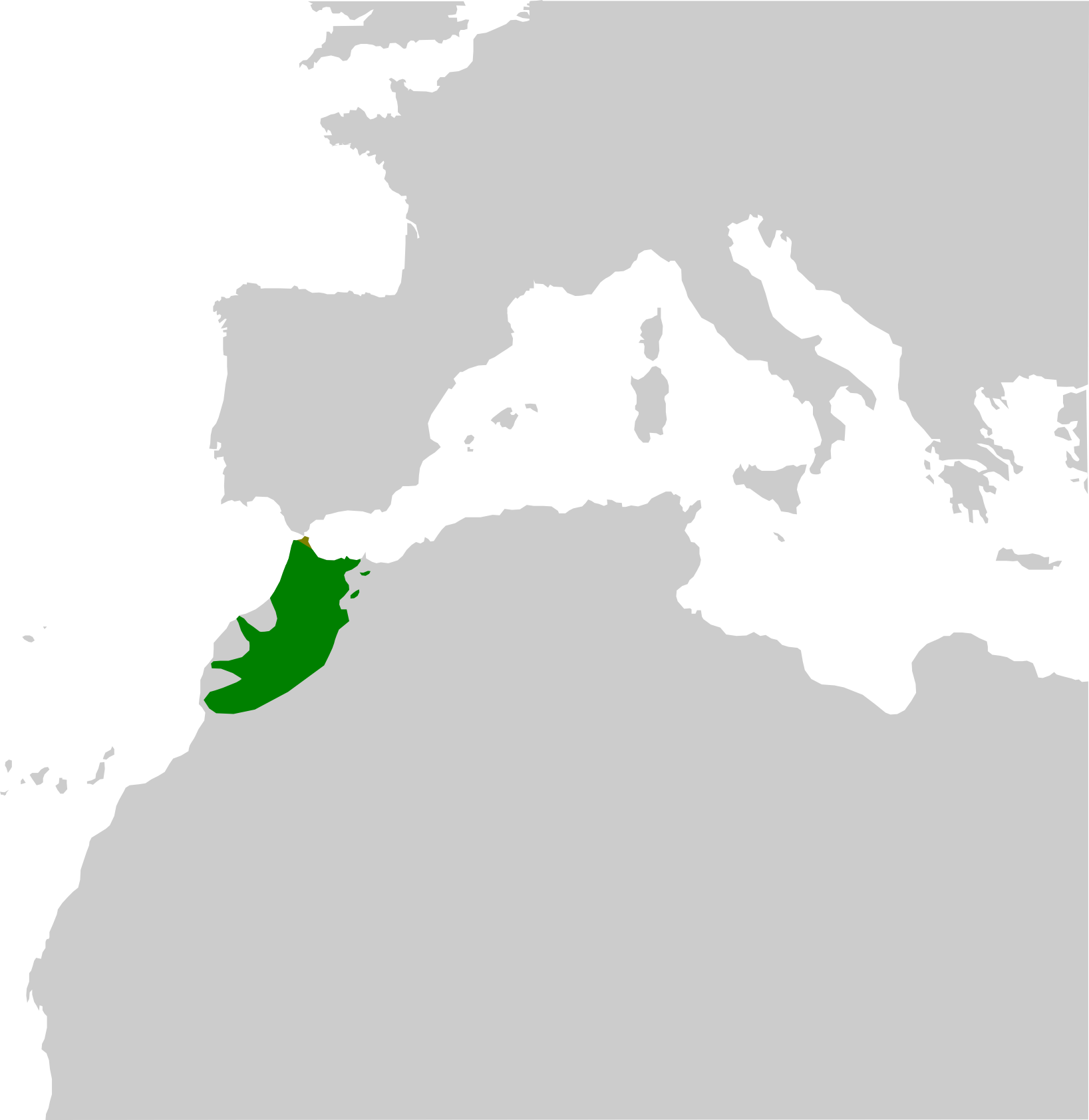

= Discoglossus scovazzi =

Moroccan painted frog

Species of amphibian

Discoglossus scovazzi, the Moroccan painted frog, in French discoglosse peint or discoglosse à ventre blanc, is a species of frog in the family Alytidae. It is found in Morocco and the Spanish North African enclaves Ceuta and Melilla.

== Habitat ==
D. scovazzi lives near streams, cisterns, and pools of either fresh or brackish water, often in Quercus forest, Nerium oleander scrub, or near ruins. It is a relatively common species in Morocco.

== Conservation and threats ==
Increasing pressure on agricultural land conversion and from surface water extraction to serve the expanding regional human population is placing downward pressure on this species (as well as other amphibians in the region). However, the species is not considered significantly threatened.

D. scovazzi is listed among the "Top 100 EDGE amphibians". It is believed to have diverged from its closest relative some 5–10 million years ago.
