= List of amphibians of Corsica =

The amphibians that live in Corsica comprise 7 species, of which 3 are endemic to the island.

== Anura ==
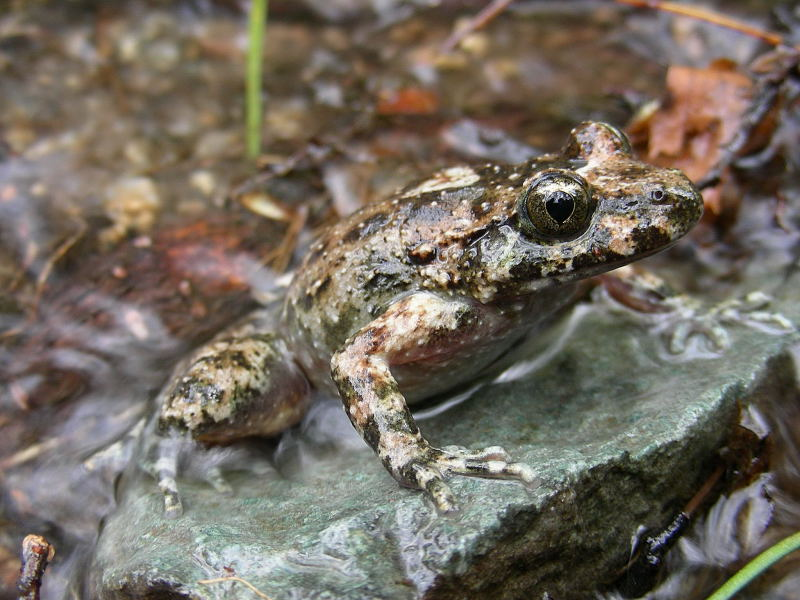
Corsican painted frog

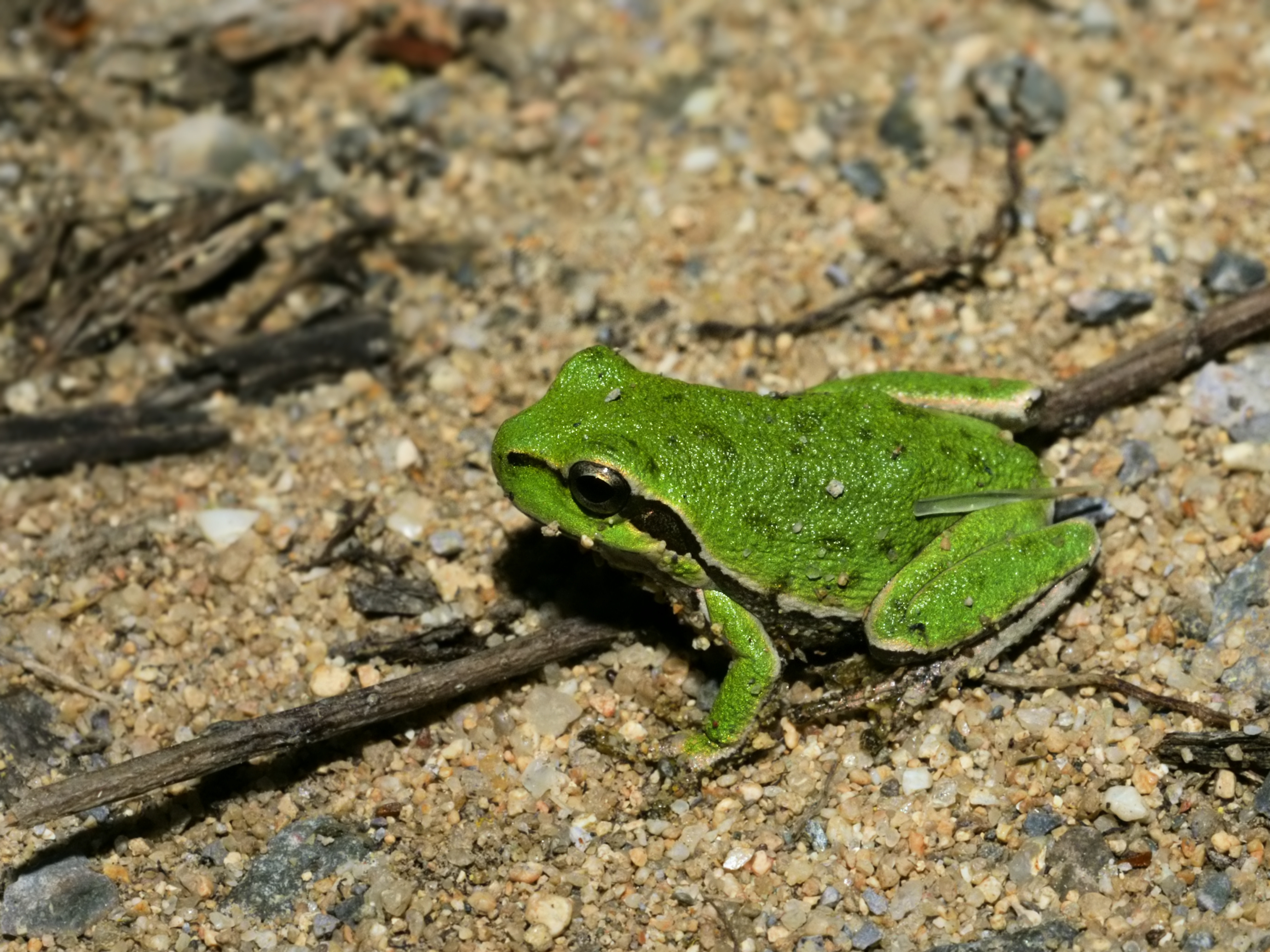
Tyrrhenian tree frog

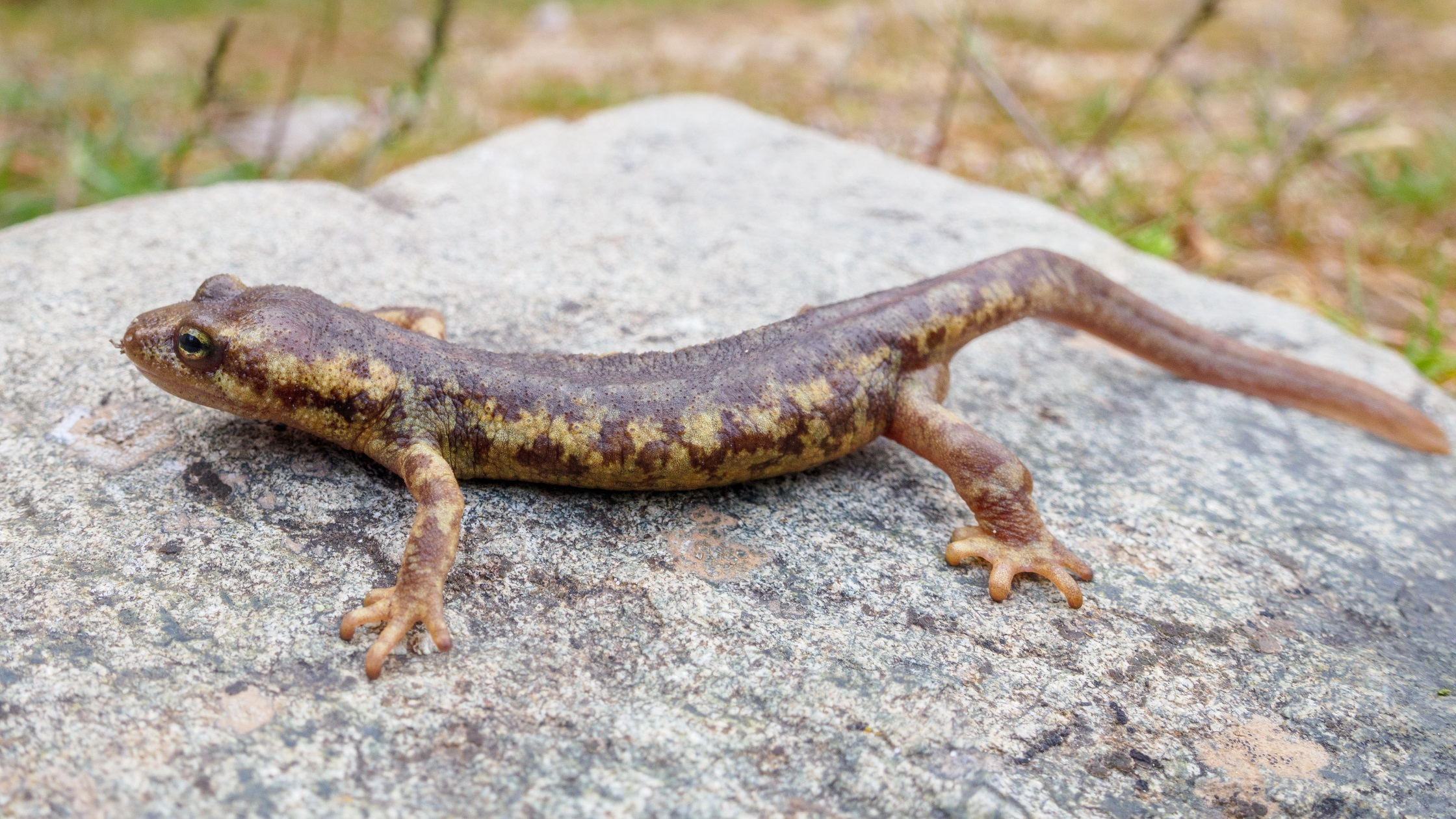
Corsican mountain newt

=== Alytidae ===
- Corsican painted frog (Discoglossus montalentii) NT
- Tyrrhenian painted frog (Discoglossus sardus) LC

=== Bufonidae ===
- Balearic green toad (Bufotes balearicus) LC

=== Hylidae ===
- Tyrrhenian tree frog (Hyla sarda) LC

=== Ranidae ===
- Italian pool frog (Pelophylax bergeri) LC

== Caudata ==
=== Salamandridae ===
- Corsican mountain newt (Euproctus montanus) LC
- Corsican fire salamander (Salamandra corsica) LC

== See also ==
- List of mammals of Corsica
- List of amphibians of Sardinia
- List of amphibians of Sicily
