= List of amphibians of Sardinia =

The amphibians that live in Sardinia comprise about 11 species. The 6 species of salamanders and newts are endemic to the island. Meanwhile, the introduction of water frogs to Sardinia from different origins and their ability to hybridize with each other make their taxonomy more complex.

== Anura ==
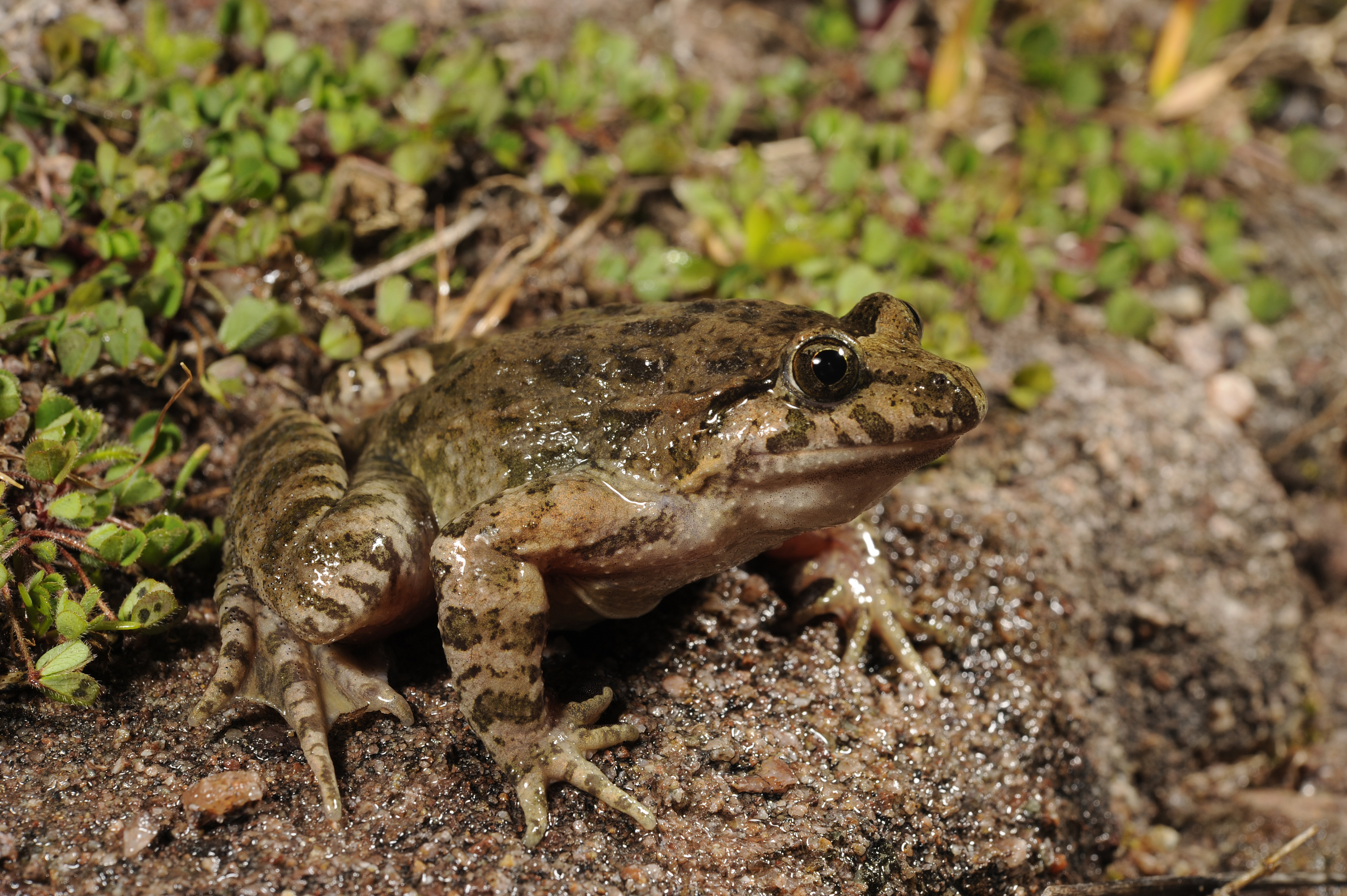
Tyrrhenian painted frog

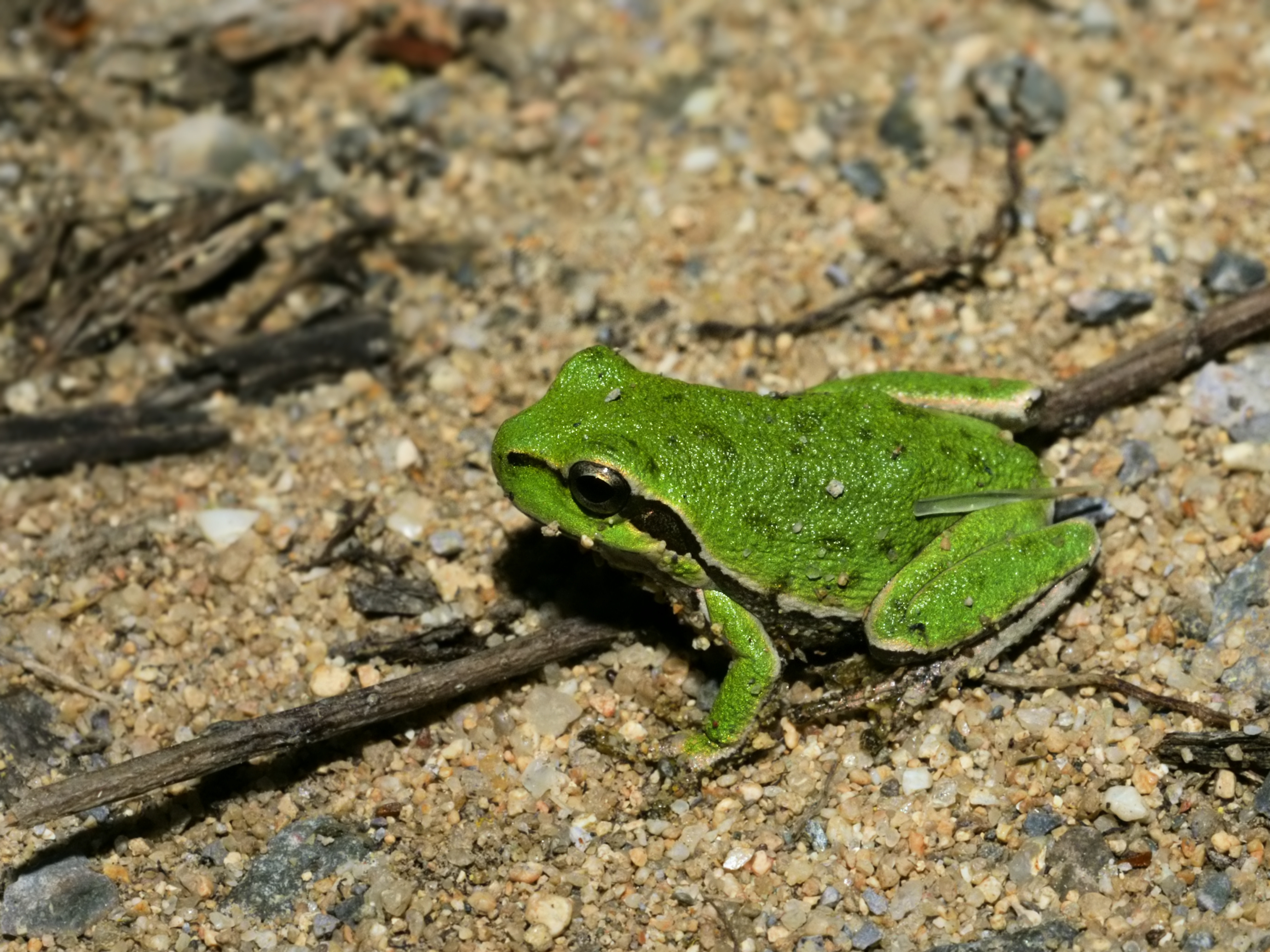
Tyrrhenian tree frog

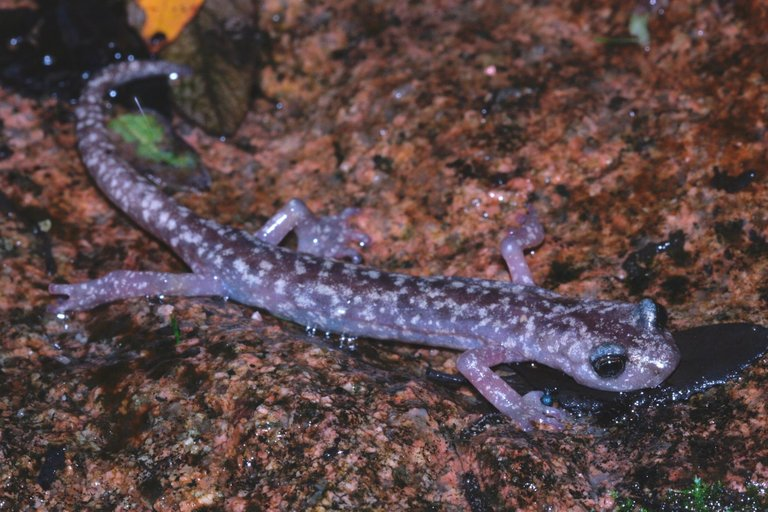
Sarrabus' cave salamander

=== Alytidae ===
- Tyrrhenian painted frog (Discoglossus sardus) LC

=== Bufonidae ===
- Balearic green toad (Bufotes balearicus) LC
- Common toad (Bufo bufo) LC

=== Hylidae ===
- Tyrrhenian tree frog (Hyla sarda) LC

=== Ranidae ===
- Italian pool frog (Pelophylax bergeri) LC
- Marsh frog (Pelophylax ridibundus) LC

== Caudata ==
=== Salamandridae ===
- Sardinian mountain newt (Euproctus platycephalus) EN

=== Plethodontidae ===
- Monte Albo cave salamander (Speleomantes flavus) EN
- Gene's cave salamander (Speleomantes genei) VU
- Odorous cave salamander (Speleomantes imperialis) NT
- Sarrabus' cave salamander (Speleomantes sarrabusensis) CR
- Supramonte cave salamander (Speleomantes supramontis) EN

== See also ==
- List of mammals of Sardinia
- List of amphibians of Italy
- List of amphibians of Corsica
- List of amphibians of Sicily
