= List of amphibians of Italy =

There are 39 species of amphibians of Italy (including introduced and naturalised species) in two orders; no Caecilian is known to live in the country.

They are listed here by family.

== Anura ==
=== Ranidae ===
- Bullfrog, Lithobathes catesbeiana (introduced)
- Italian pool frog, Pelophylax bergeri
- Pool frog, Pelophylax lessonae
- Marsh frog, Pelophylax ridibunda
- Agile frog, Rana dalmatina
- Italian stream frog, Rana italica (endemic)
- Italian agile frog, Rana latastei
- Perez's frog, Rana perezi
- Common frog, Rana temporaria

=== Discoglossidae ===
- Mediterranean painted frog, Discoglossus pictus
- Tyrrhenian painted frog, Discoglossus sardus

=== Bombinatoridae ===
- Apennine yellow-bellied toad, Bombina pachypus (endemic)
- Yellow-bellied toad, Bombina variegata

=== Hylidae ===
- European tree frog, Hyla arborea
- Italian tree frog, Hyla intermedia
- Mediterranean tree frog, Hyla meridionalis
- Sardinian tree frog, Hyla sarda

=== Bufonidae ===
- Balearic green toad, Bufo balearicus
- Common toad or European toad, Bufo bufo
- Sicilian green toad, Bufo siculus (endemic)
- European green toad, Bufo viridis

=== Pelobatidae ===
- Common spadefoot, Pelobates fuscus

=== Pelodytidae ===
- Common parsley frog, Pelodytes punctatus

== Caudata ==
=== Salamandridae ===
- Sardinian brook salamander, Euproctus platycephalus (endemic)
- Alpine newt, Ichthyosaura alpestris
- Smooth newt, Lissotriton vulgaris
- Alpine salamander, Salamandra atra
- Lanza's alpine salamander, Salamandra lanzai
- Fire salamander, Salamandra salamandra
- Spectacled salamander, Salamandrina terdigitata (endemic)
- Italian crested newt, Triturus carnifex

=== Plethodontidae ===
- Ambrosi's cave salamander, Speleomantes ambrosii (endemic)
- Monte Albo cave salamander, Speleomantes flavus (endemic)
- Imperial cave salamander, Speleomantes imperialis (endemic)
- Italian cave salamander, Speleomantes italicus (endemic)
- Sarrabus' cave salamander, Speleomantes sarrabusensis (endemic)
- Strinati's cave salamander, Speleomantes strinatii
- Supramonte cave salamander, Speleomantes supramontis (endemic)

=== Proteidae ===
- Olm, Proteus anguinus

== See also ==
- List of amphibians of Sardinia
- List of amphibians of Sicily
