= Zembra =

Tunisian island

Coordinates: 37°08′10″N 10°48′32″E

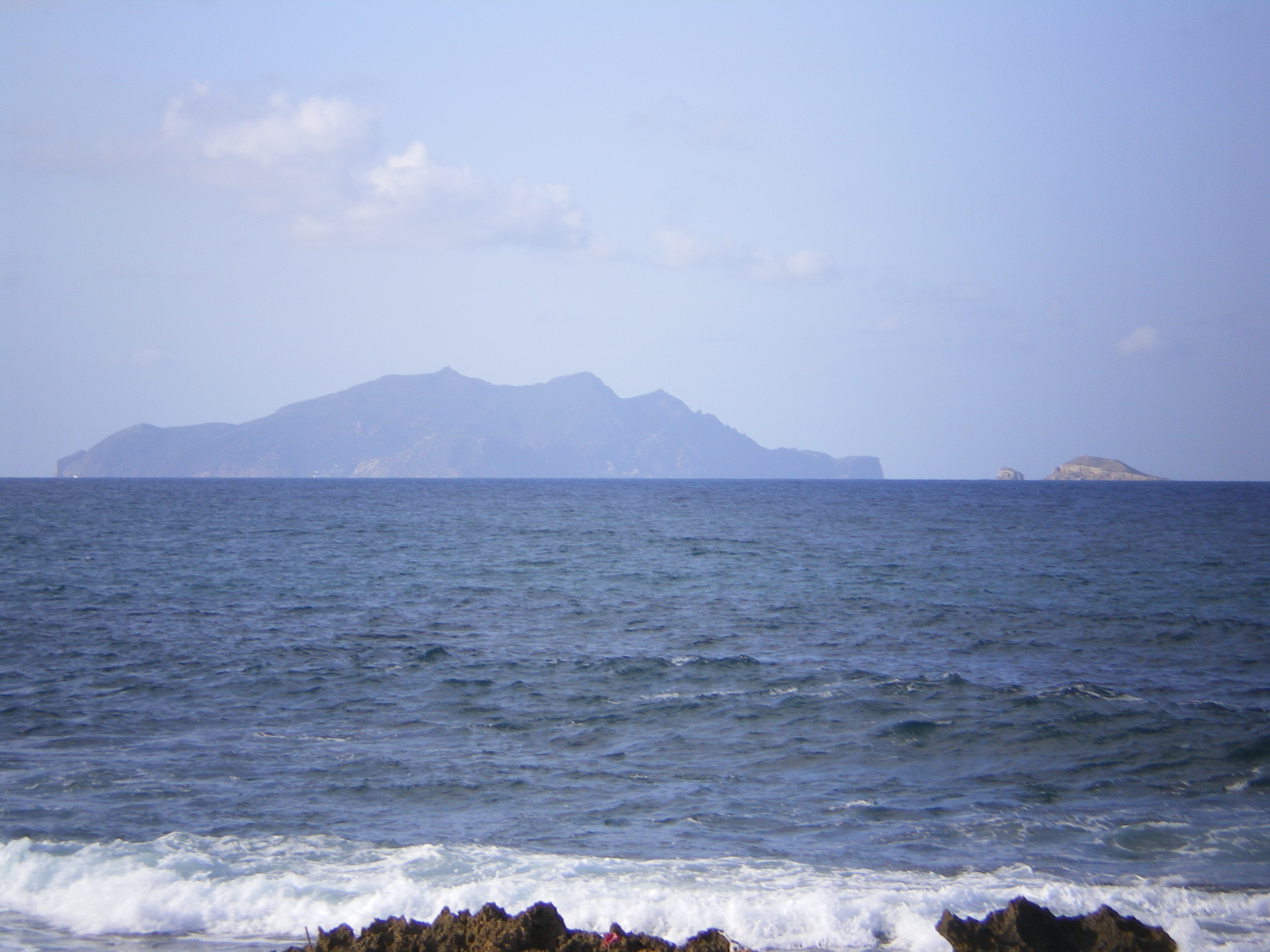
View of Zembra (left) and Zembretta (right)

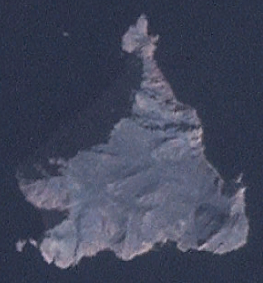
Satellite image of Zembra.

Zembra (Tunisian Arabic: زمبرة Zimbra) is a Tunisian island. The island is a 432-metre-tall (1,417-foot) rock formation, and as such contains many 400 metre-high cliffs. It has an area of 369 hectares (912 acres). Located 15 kilometres (8 nautical miles) from El Haouaria and 50 km (27 nmi) from the port of La Goulette, it is a natural extension of the peninsula of Cap Bon. Zembra is a natural fortress that housed a resort until 1976 and then passed into the hands of the Tunisian army. On the southern coast there are remains of an ancient harbour.

Zembra is most probably the same island called Aegimurus (Ancient Greek: Αἰγίμορος) by many ancient writers. Pliny the Elder called both Zembra and Zembretta Aegimuri.

== Environment ==
Zembra has a fragile ecosystem and has been classified as a protected area by UNESCO since 1977. With the nearby islet of Zembretta, it is also classified as an Important Bird Area (TN003). The island has a Mediterranean climate. The native soils include rock, clay, sand and magnesium lime.

=== Flora and fauna ===
Zembra is a local hotspot (nano-hotspot) for the vascular flora on the scale of Tunisia, and an Important Plant Area (IPA) for North Africa. The island's vegetation consists of about 266 plant species; the flora is characterised by a canopy of dense bush, including olive, Phoenician juniper and gorse, and the presence of rare plants which favour saline soils.

There are also invertebrates and terrestrial mammals introduced by humans, such as rabbit, Corsican sheep, black rat and feral cat. Dolphins are also common in the waters surrounding the island. The Mediterranean monk seal Monachus monachus (CR) used to visit the island, but the last sightings were reported in 1975.

In addition, Zembra is located on an avian migration route between Tunisia and the Strait of Sicily, and hosts more than 25,000 pairs of migrating birds which nest in the rocky cliffs. The island is home to the largest colony of Scopoli's shearwaters in the Mediterranean (20,000 breeding pairs). The 9 km of cliffs of the island also hold 10 breeding pairs of Peregrine falcons Falco peregrinus, one of the highest densities known for this species. Other breeding birds include the rare Audouin's gulls Larus audouinii (10 pairs), European shags Phalacrocorax aristotelis and Caspian gulls Larus cachinnans (100 pairs).

The island, along with the neighbouring islet of Zembretta, has been designated an Important Bird Area (IBA) by BirdLife International.
