= Zembretta =

Tunisian island

Coordinates: 37°06′24″N 10°52′26″E

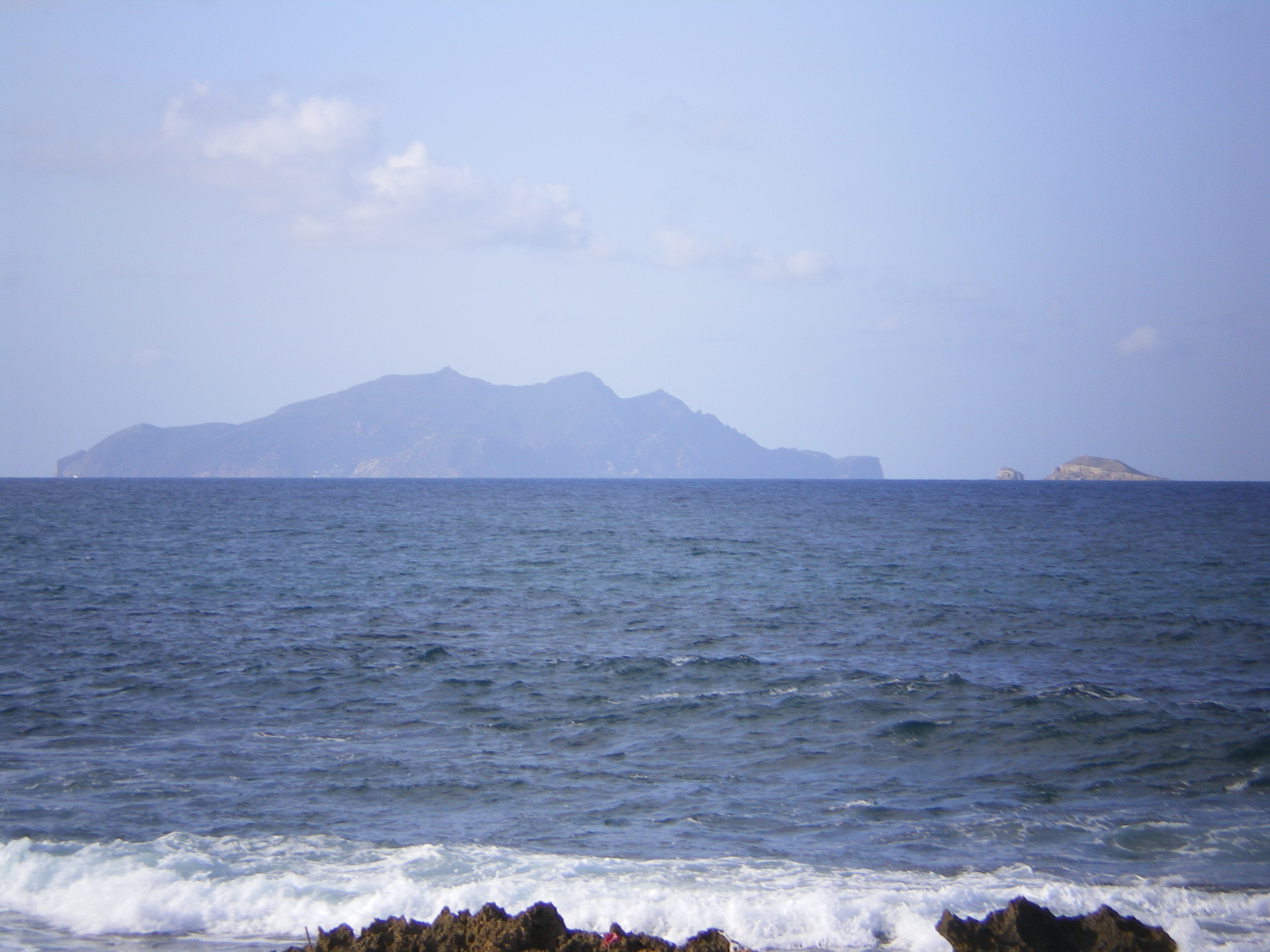
View from El Haouaria

Zembretta (Arabic: الجامور الصغير) is an island located in the north-eastern Gulf of Tunis about 8 kilometres (5 miles) east of the island of Zembra. Its area is two hectares.

With Zembra, it is also classified as an Important Bird Area (TN003).
