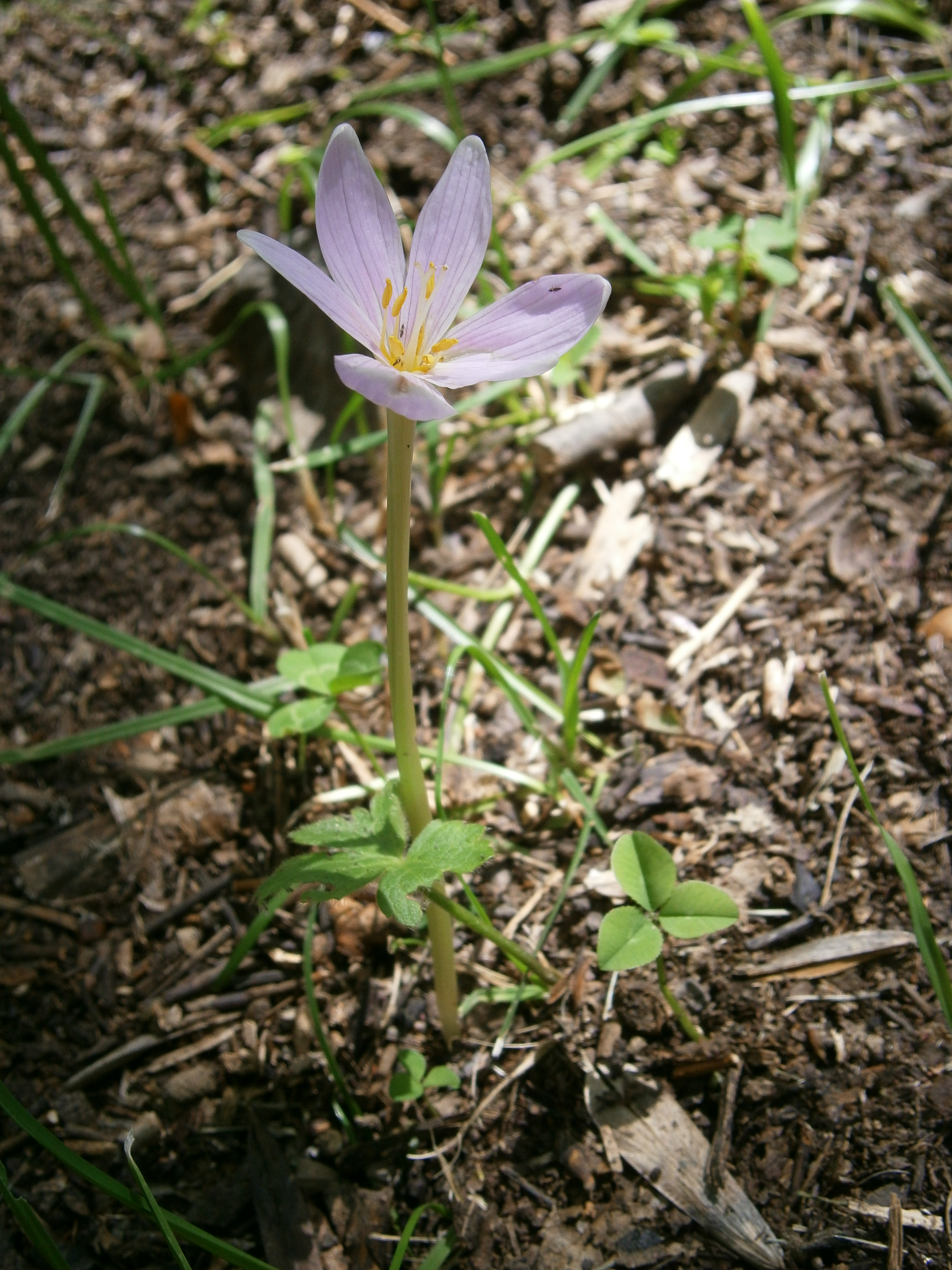

Scientific classification
- Kingdom: Plantae
- Clade: Tracheophytes
- Clade: Angiosperms
- Clade: Monocots
- Order: Liliales
- Family: Colchicaceae
- Genus: Colchicum
- Species: C. alpinum

Binomial name
- Colchicum alpinum DC.

Synonyms
- Colchicum parvulum Ten.; Colchicum alpinum var. parvulum (Ten.) Baker; Colchicum alpinum subsp. parvulum (Ten.) Nyman; Colchicum merenderoides E.P.Perrier & Songeon; Colchicum alpinum subsp. merenderoides (E.P.Perrier & Songeon) Rouy; Colchicum pseudoparvulum Lojac.; Colchicum vallis-demonis Lojac.

= Colchicum alpinum =

Species of flowering plant

Colchicum alpinum, the alpine autumn crocus, is a corm-forming perennial with pale, delicate rosy-purple flowers, similar to C. autumnale but smaller. It is native to the Alps and the Appennini of Italy, Switzerland, France and Sicily, and cultivated as an ornamental in other regions.

== Vegetative cycle and phenology ==
Colchicum alpinum emerges from underground corms—swollen storage organs up to about 40 × 30 mm—each late summer to produce flowers without any accompanying leaves. These flowers open in August, then wither and give way to capsules the following year. The flowers have four outer tepals 30–50 mm long (rarely under 30 mm) atop scapes clothed in 4–6 leaves. In the spring after flowering, a rosette of leaves unfolds, and the previously formed fruits (capsules) mature by early summer. This pattern of flowering in one year and fruiting in the next constitutes a biennial life cycle that distinguishes C. alpinum from its close relative, C. autumnale, which typically flowers and fruits within the same growing season.

Under certain conditions—particularly at lower elevations or when grown in milder climates—some individuals may complete both flowering and fruiting in a single year, or even produce leaves concurrently with flowers. Transplant experiments have shown that extending the length of the growing season can shift C. alpinum towards an annual cycle more similar to C. autumnale, demonstrating the influence of environmental factors on its phenology.

== Distribution and habitat ==
In Sardinia, Colchicum alpinum occurs throughout the interior highlands, with confirmed populations at Ortakis (the type locality), the Supramonte of Orgosolo, Monte Albo, the Mandas–Marghine region and other upland sites. These stands grow both on calcareous outcrops (e.g. Ortakis, Monte Albo) and siliceous terrains (Supramonte d'Otulu), demonstrating an ecological flexibility across substrate types.

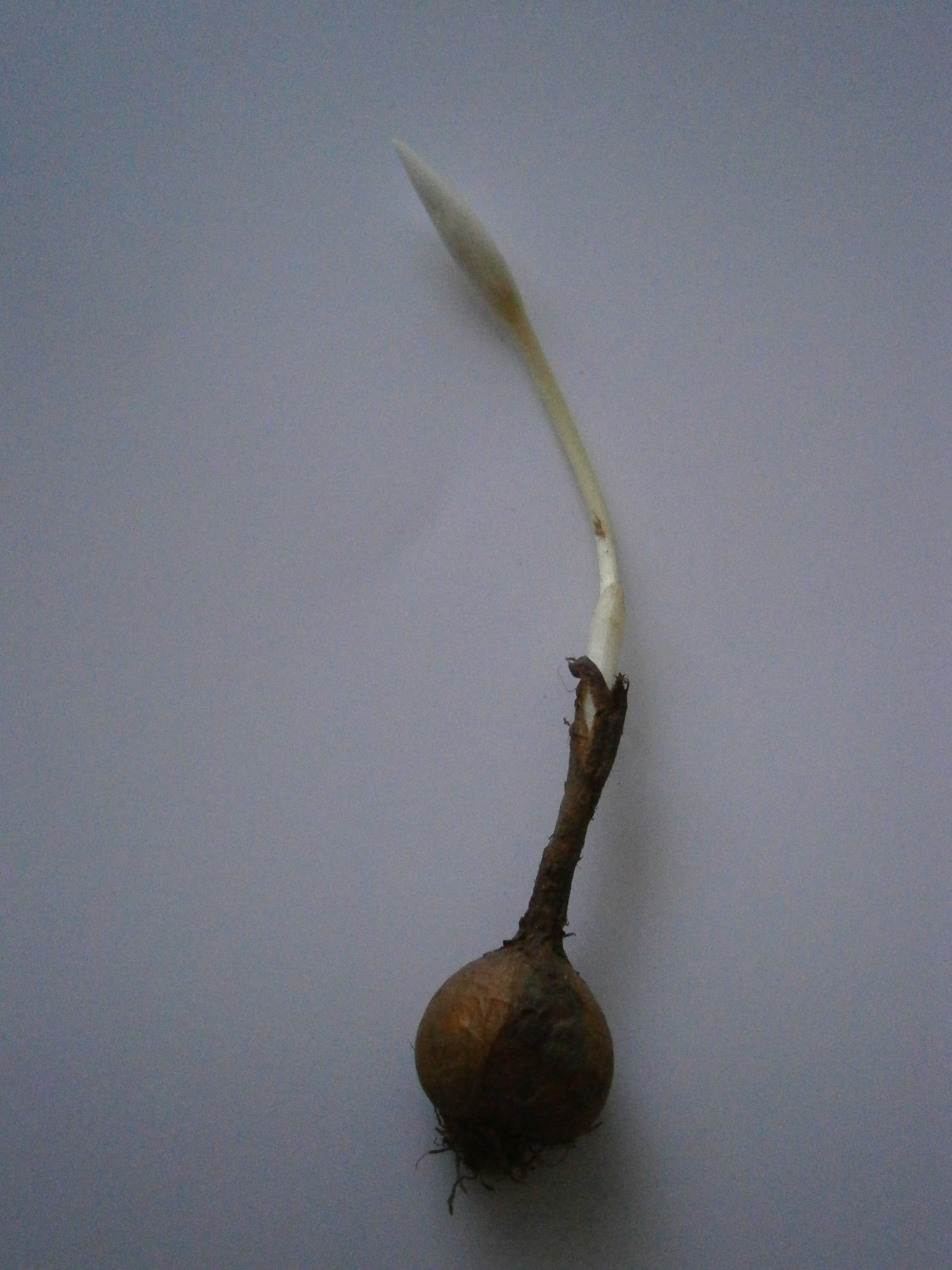
Corm with flower bud

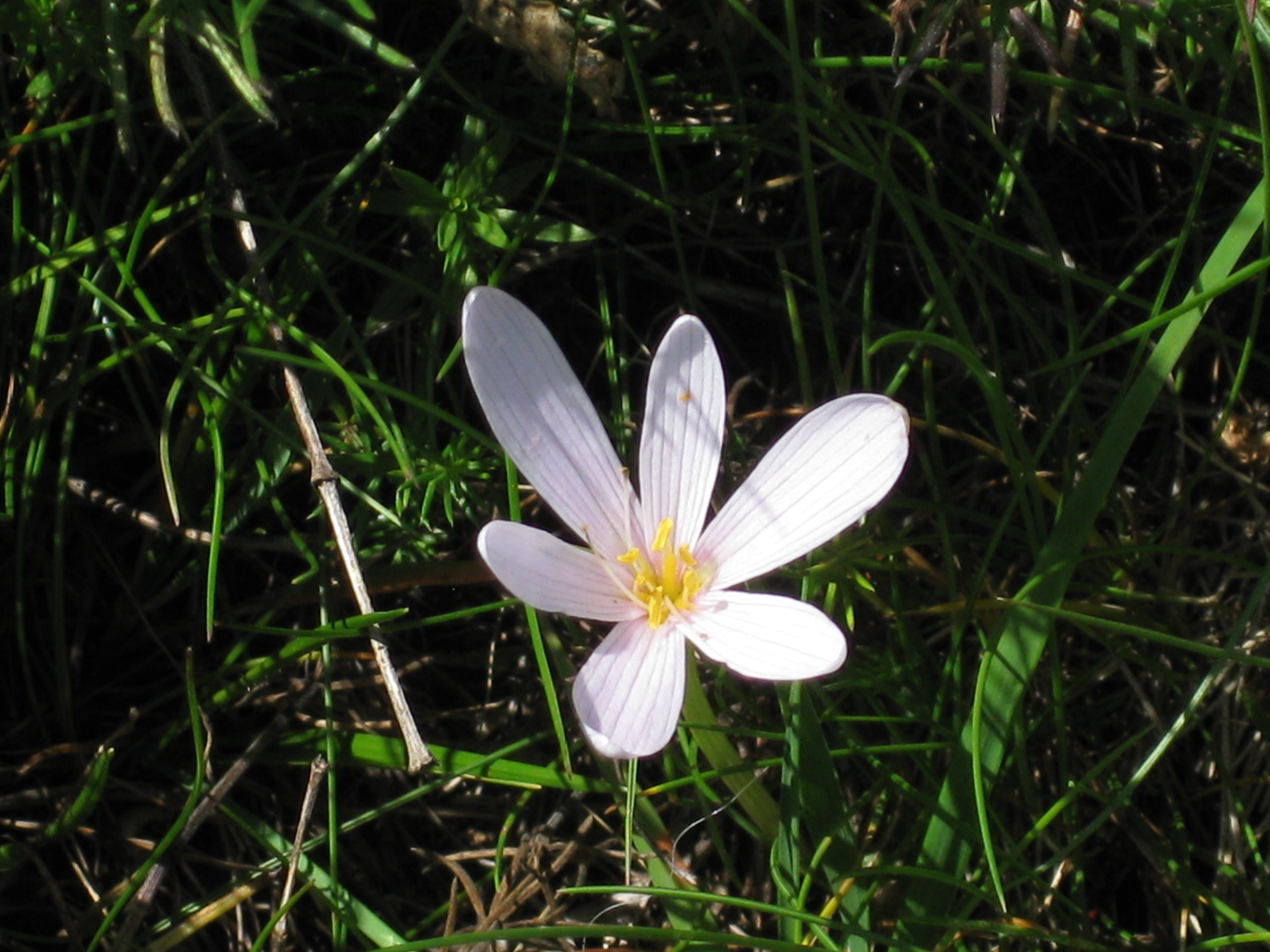
Colchicum alpinum in Les Grandes Rousses (Oisans)

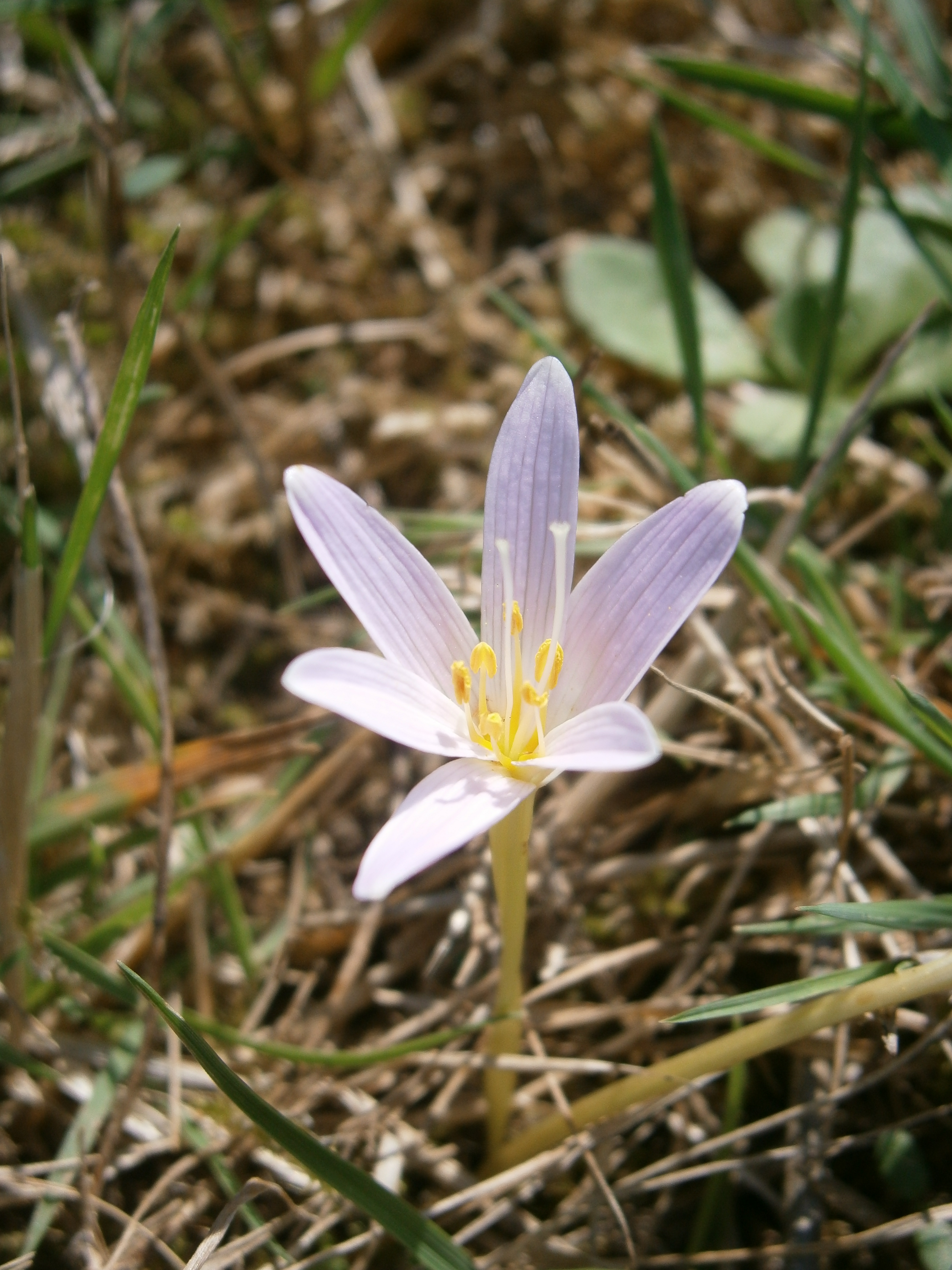
Colchicum alpinum in a collector garden

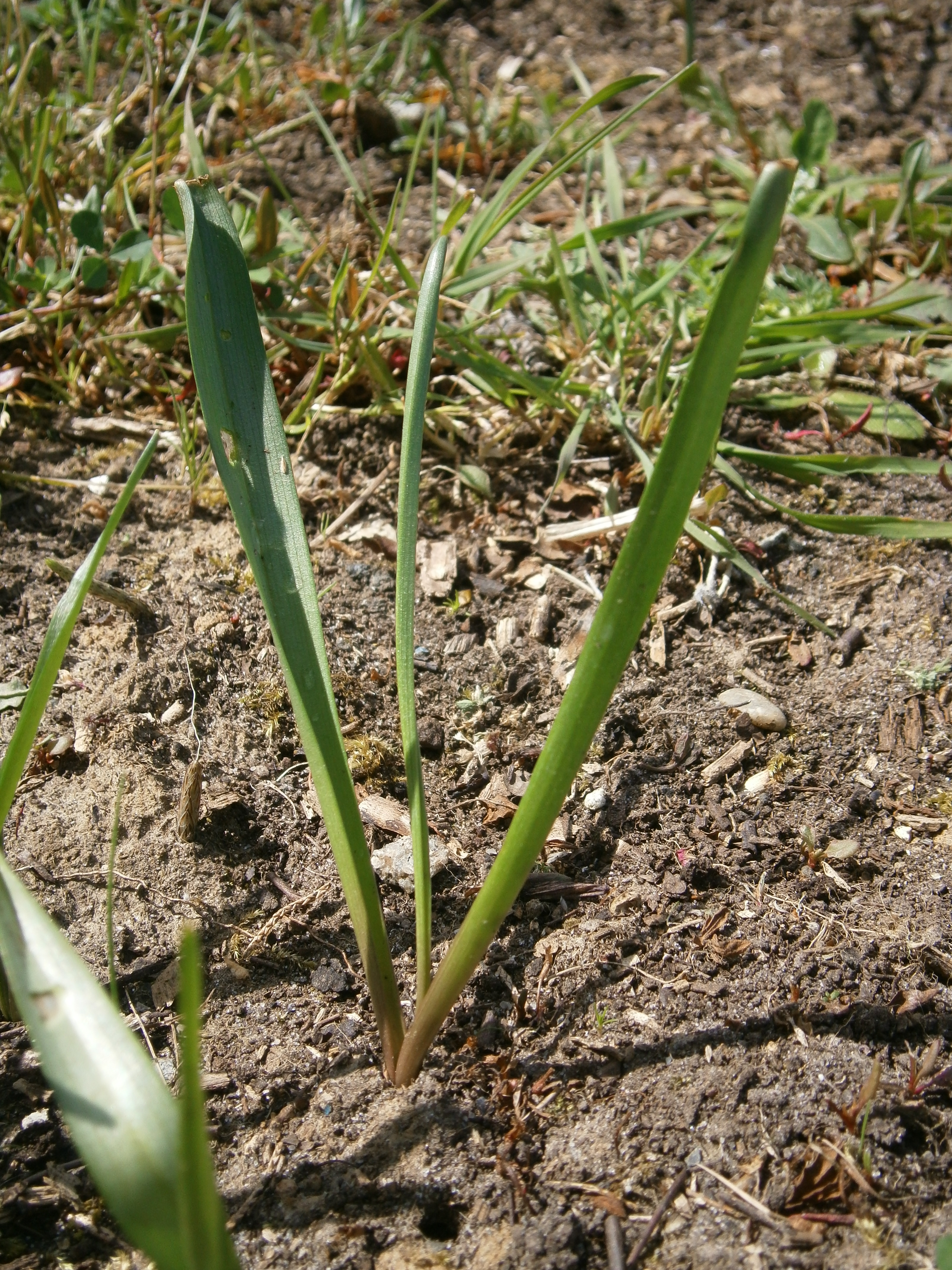
Leaves in the spring

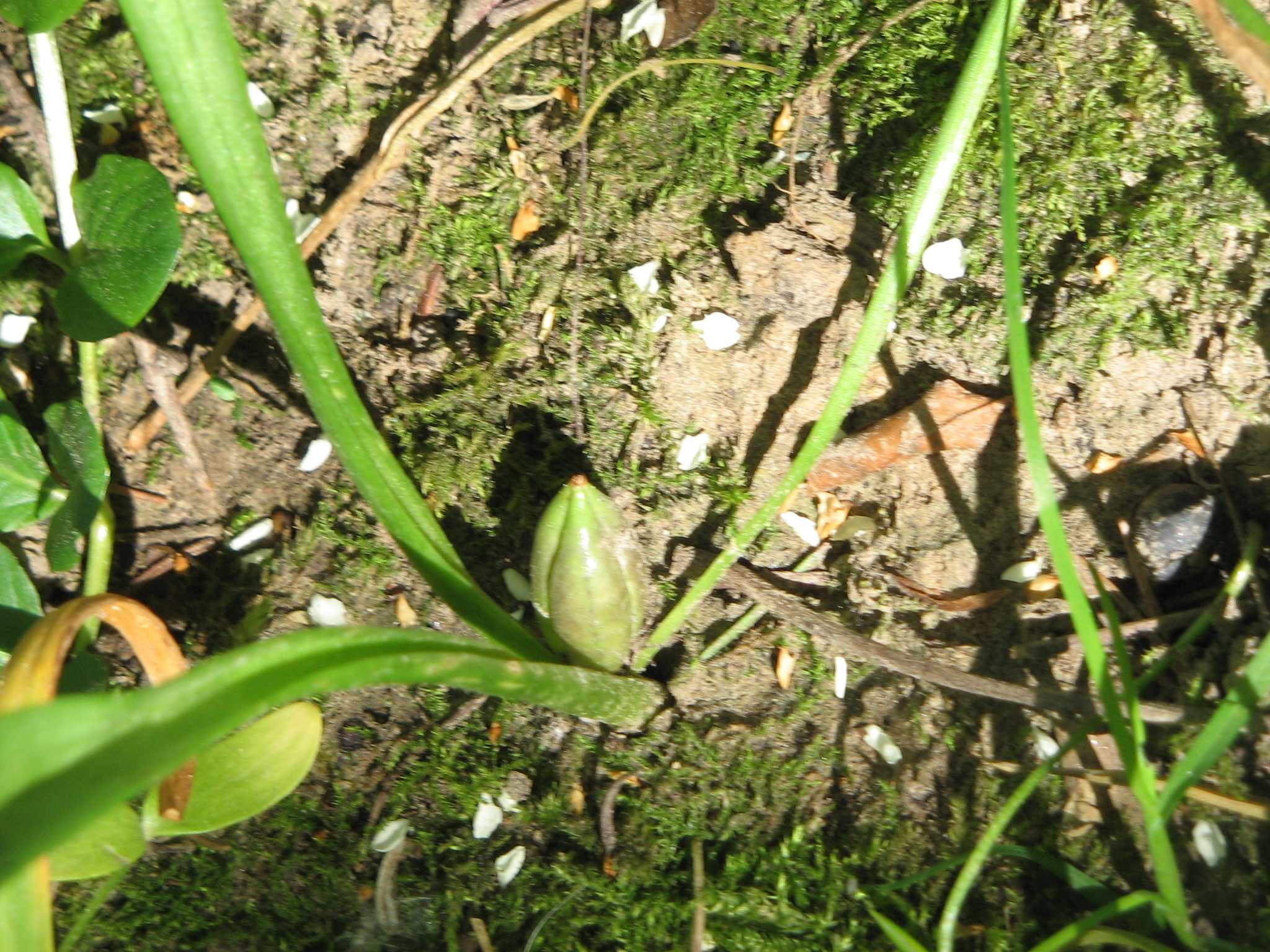
Seed capsule
