= Monte Albo =

Limestone massif on the Island of Sardinia, Italy

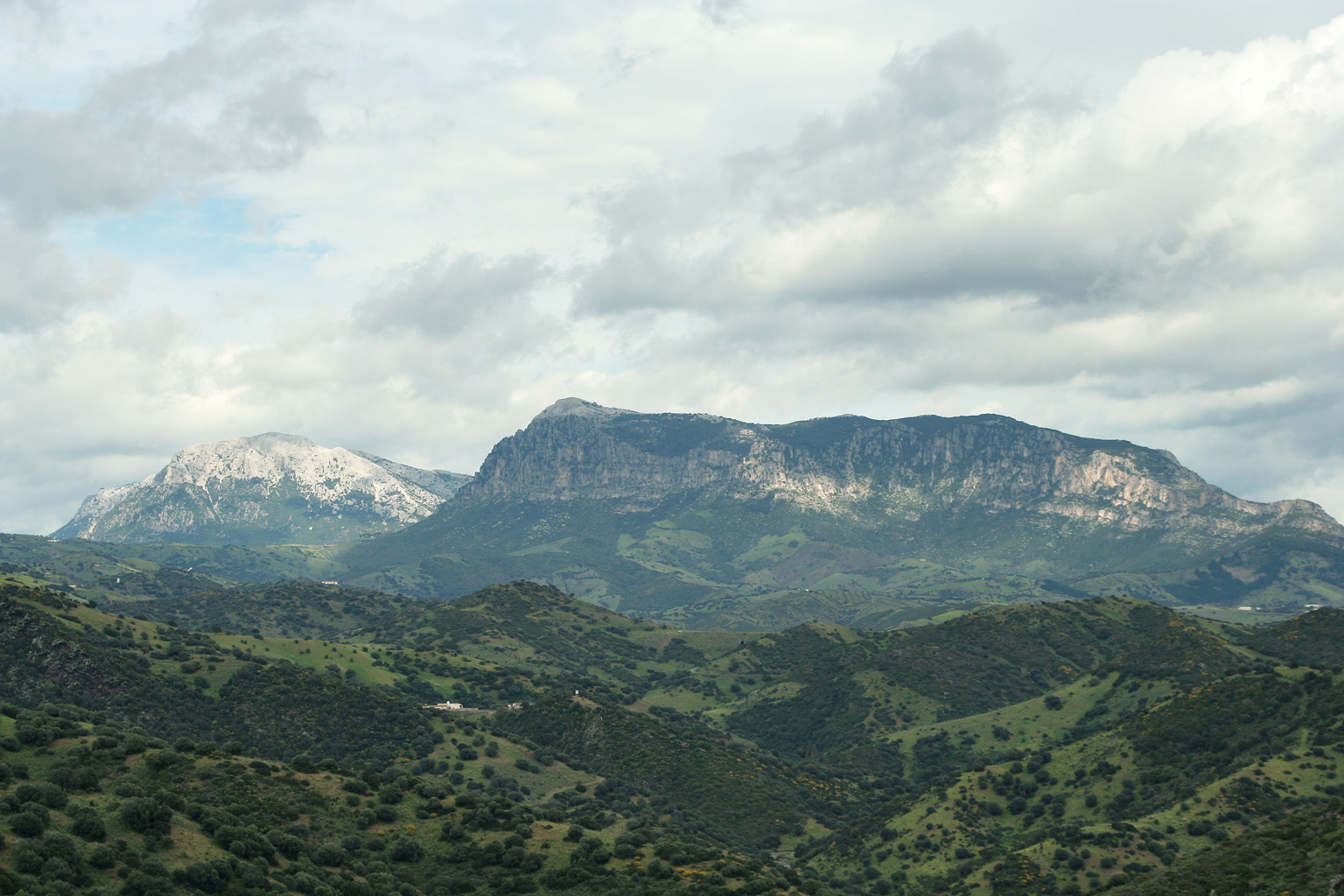
- Monte Albo seen from Su Tempiesu (Orune)

Highest point
- Peak: Punta Catirina/Monte Turuddo
- Elevation: 1,127 m (3,698 ft)
- Coordinates: 40°32′N 9°35′E

Naming
- Native name: Monte Albu, Monte Arbu (Sardinian)

Geography
- Location within Italy
- Country: Italy
- Region: Sardinia

The Monte Albo (Monte Arbu in Sardinian) is a limestone massif 20 kilometres (12 mi) in length in the central eastern portion of Island of Sardinia, Italy. Punta Catirina and Monte Turuddo, both at 1,127 metres (0.700 mi), are the highest points. The massif forms a prominent hogback ridge characterized by dramatic vertical cliffs on its northwestern flank and extensive karst features, including sinkholes, collapse features, and underground water systems. Monte Albo's geological composition consists primarily of Middle Jurassic to Lower Cretaceous limestones and dolostones deposited on a Palaeozoic metamorphic basement, which have been uplifted and tilted by tectonic forces. The mountain is recognized as a biodiversity hotspot, hosting 18 amphibian and reptile species, including 8 endemic taxa such as the Monte Albo cave salamander, which is found exclusively in this massif.

== Geology and geomorphology ==
Monte Albo is a prominent karst massif in north-eastern Sardinia, extending some 30 km in a northeast–southwest direction and up to 5 km wide. It rises from roughly 50 m above sea level at its base to peaks exceeding 1,100 m, such as Punta Catirina (1,127 m). The core of the chain consists of Middle Jurassic to Lower Cretaceous limestones and dolostones deposited on an eroded Palaeozoic metamorphic basement of phyllites, schists and gneisses. These carbonates record a succession of shallow-marine environments—from tidal flats and ooid shoals through reef and back-reef facies to lagoonal Purbeckian-age marls—and are cut by a complex network of joints and bedding planes.

Tectonic forces associated with the Pyrenean and Apennine orogenies have uplifted and tilted this sedimentary pile along two principal fault systems (NE–SW and E–W), producing the classic hogback profiles of Monte Albo. Overthrusting on the Nuoro Fault emplaced younger carbonates atop the metamorphic basement, and ongoing differential erosion has carved tall, vertical cliffs on the north-western flank. Acidic rainfall infiltrating the carbonate rocks has driven karstification since the Neogene, creating both micro-scale solution features—such as rillenkarren (narrow solution grooves) and solution pans—and macro-forms including large dolines (sinkholes), perched valleys, and deep collapse features. The massif hosts some of Sardinia's most striking karst sites: broad depressions like Campu 'e Susu and Sas Puntas, the massive 45×30 m Tumba 'e Nudorra sinkhole, vertical shafts over 100 m deep (e.g. Tumba 'e Nurai), relic horizontal caves preserved high on the slopes, and active resurgence systems (particularly the Locoli spring) that channel underground rivers back to the surface after heavy rainfall.

== Biodiversity ==
The Monte Albo massif is a recognised biodiversity hotspot for amphibians and reptiles. Surveys carried out between 2012 and 2016 recorded 18 species: five amphibians—Speleomantes flavus, Euproctus platycephalus, Bufo balearicus, Discoglossus sardus and Hyla sarda—and thirteen reptiles, including the European pond turtle Emys orbicularis and the Italian wall lizard Podarcis siculus. Two taxa, the marginated tortoise Testudo marginata and the grass snake subspecies Natrix natrix cetti, were reported here for the first time, raising the reptile tally to 14 and emphasising the area’s conservation value. Eight of the 18 species are endemic to Sardinia or the Corsica–Sardinia region—with the cave salamander S. flavus confined exclusively to Monte Albo.
