= List of amphibians of Sicily =

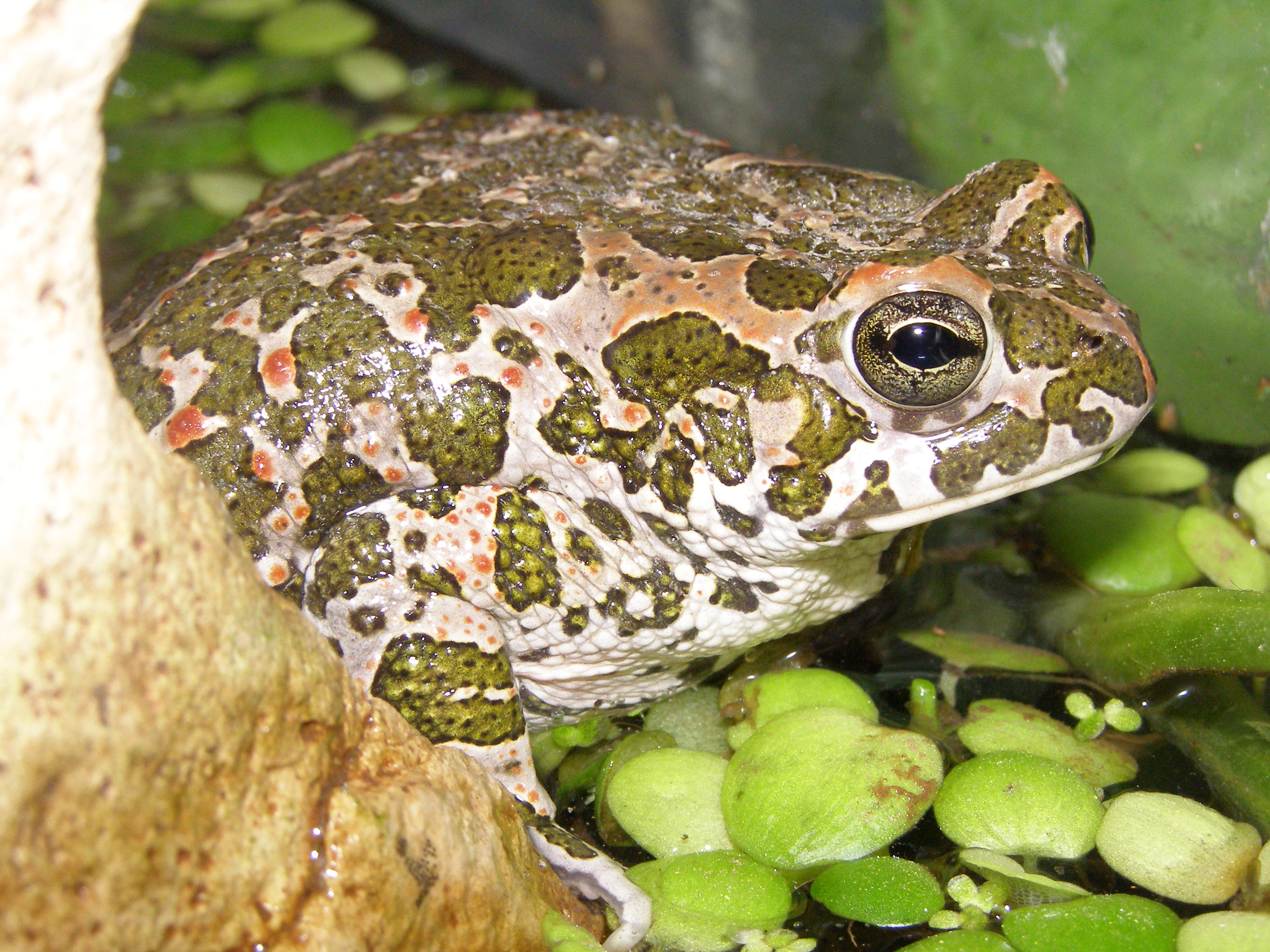
The African green toad population constitutes a unique subspecies, the Sicilian green toad, sometimes treated as a separate species.

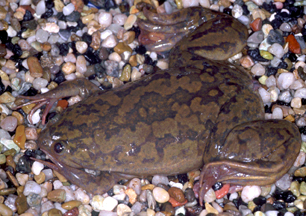
The introduced population of the African clawed frog on the island is considered to be the largest in Europe.

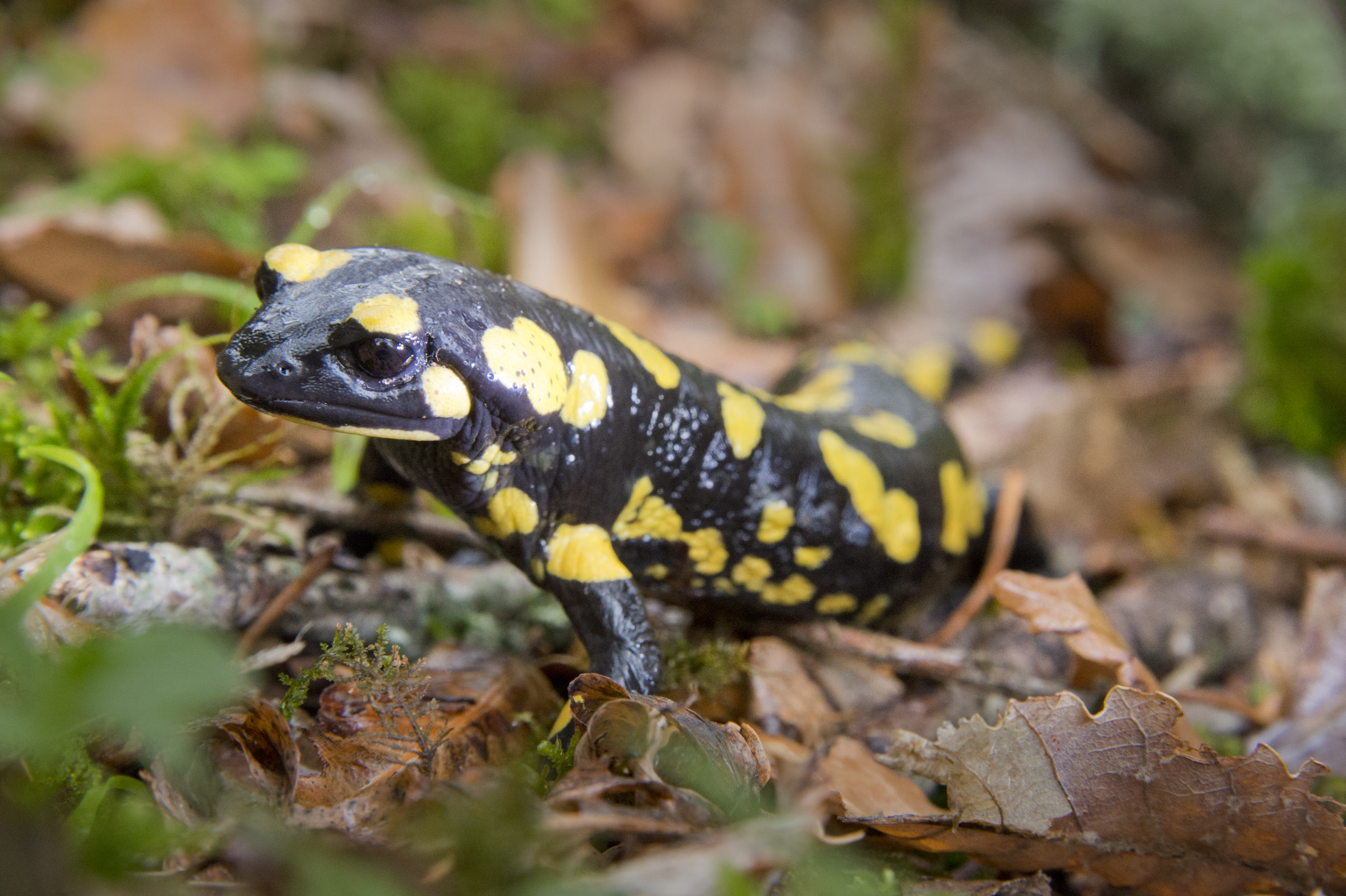
The presence of fire salamanders in Sicily is extremely rare and could be extinct.

There are nine amphibian species that live on the island of Sicily.

== Anura ==
=== Alytidae ===
- Mediterranean painted frog (Discoglossus pictus) LC

=== Bufonidae ===
- Balearic green toad (Bufotes balearicus) LC
- African green toad (Bufotes boulengeri) LC
  - Sicilian green toad (Bufotes boulengeri siculus / Bufotes siculus) LC
- Common toad (Bufo bufo) LC

=== Hylidae ===
- Italian tree frog (Hyla intermedia) LC

=== Ranidae ===
- Italian pool frog (Pelophylax bergeri) LC
- Italian edible frog (Pelophylax kl. hispanicus) LC

=== Pipidae ===
- African clawed frog (Xenopus laevis) LC

== Caudata ==
=== Salamandridae ===
- Fire salamander (Salamandra salamandra) VU

== See also ==
- List of mammals of Sicily
- List of amphibians of Italy
- List of amphibians of Corsica
- List of amphibians of Sardinia
