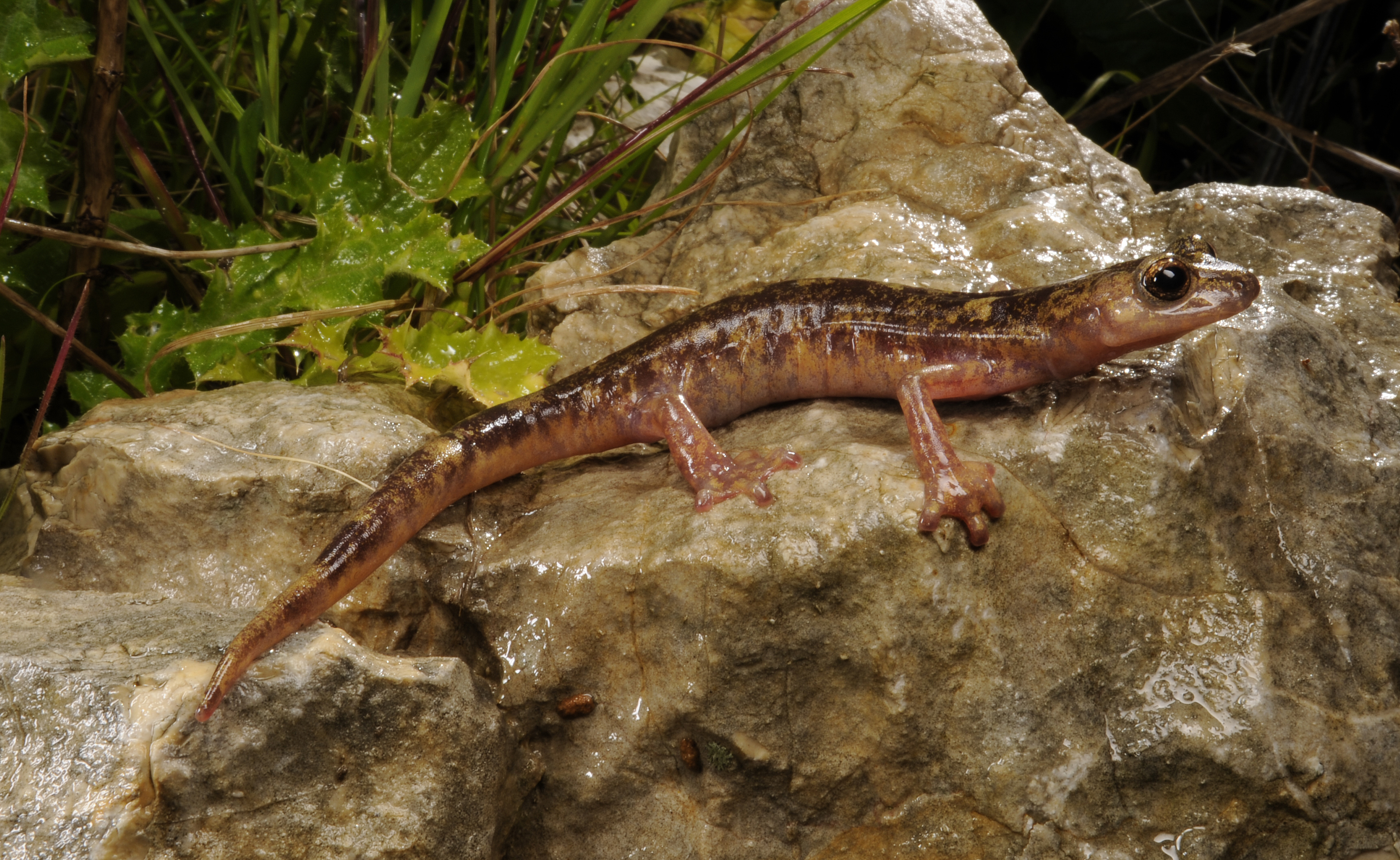

Conservation status
- Endangered (IUCN 3.1)

Scientific classification
- Kingdom: Animalia
- Phylum: Chordata
- Class: Amphibia
- Order: Urodela
- Family: Plethodontidae
- Genus: Speleomantes
- Species: S. flavus

Binomial name
- Speleomantes flavus (Stefani, 1969)
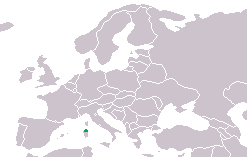

Synonyms
- Hydromantes flavus Stefani, 1969

= Monte Albo cave salamander =

Species of amphibian

The Monte Albo cave salamander or Stefani's salamander (Speleomantes flavus) is a species of salamander in the family Plethodontidae, endemic to Sardinia.

Its natural habitats are temperate forests, rocky areas, caves, and subterranean habitats (other than caves) in the vicinity of streams. The preferred habitat often has a good covering of damp moss. It reproduces through the direct development of a few terrestrial eggs

It is threatened by habitat loss.
