= El Haouaria =

Coordinates: 37°03′N 11°01′E

El Haouaria الهوارية
- Commune and town
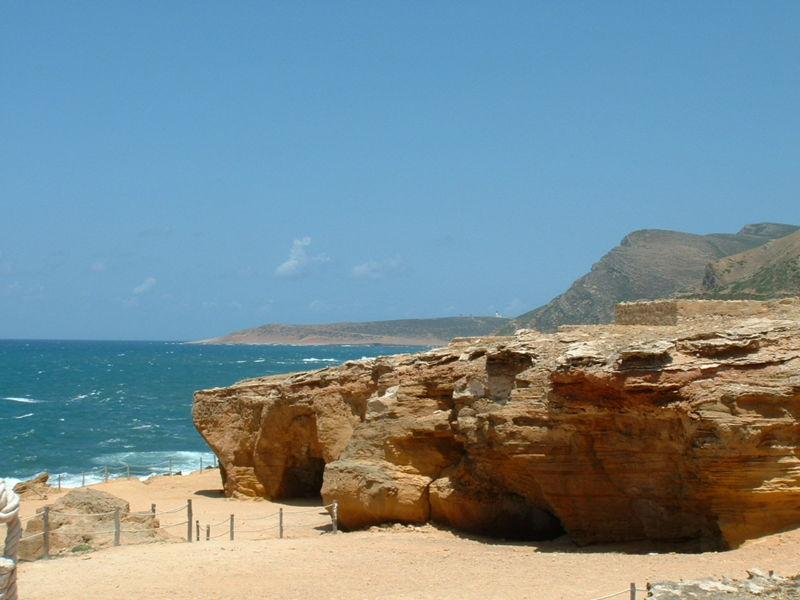
- Interactive map of El Haouaria
- Country: Tunisia
- Governorate: Nabeul Governorate

Government
  - Mayor: Nawfel Miladi (Nidaa Tounes)

Population (2014)
  - Total: 9,629
- Time zone: UTC+1 (CET)

El Haouaria is a coastal town and commune in the Nabeul Governorate, situated in north-eastern Tunisia. As of 2004 it had a population of 9,273.

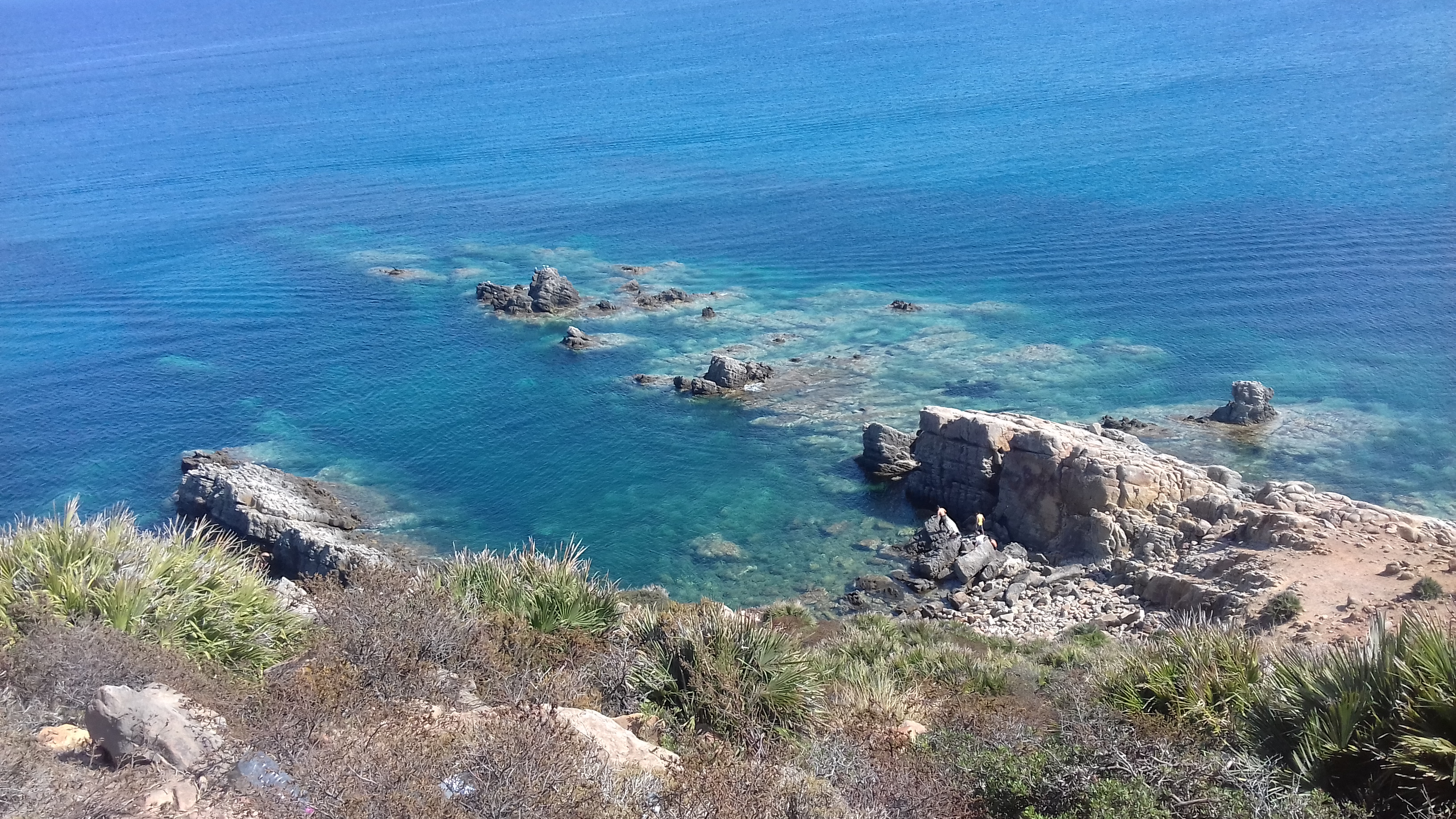
Water El Haouaria

== History ==
El Haouaria, referred to by the Greeks as Hermaea, is first mentioned in the ancient Greek Periplus of Pseudo-Skylax (4th–3rd century BC). In this text, it is described as a polis (city) and recognized as one of the oldest maritime ports on the Cap Bon Peninsula.

Caves of El Haouaria are located three kilometers west of the city, near the Ghar El Kebir site. These artificial quarries were probably dug by prisoners or slaves under the authority of the Carthaginians and later the Romans. The stone blocks extracted from them were transported by sea to Carthage, across the Gulf of Tunis. They were used to build the Punic city, as well as the construction of the forts in the Medina of Tunis.

== Mayors ==
A list of Mayors of El Haouaria since the creation of the municipality:

- Hamed Ben Salem
- Mahmoud Miladi
- Alaya Ben Taleb
- Kilani Lassoued
- Maouia Bel Haj
- Hamadi Bouaicha
- Faouzi Ben Jdira
- Ahmed Boussak
- Bechir Hmissi
- Farid Ben Fadhel

== See also ==
- List of cities in Tunisia
