= List of mammals of Corsica =

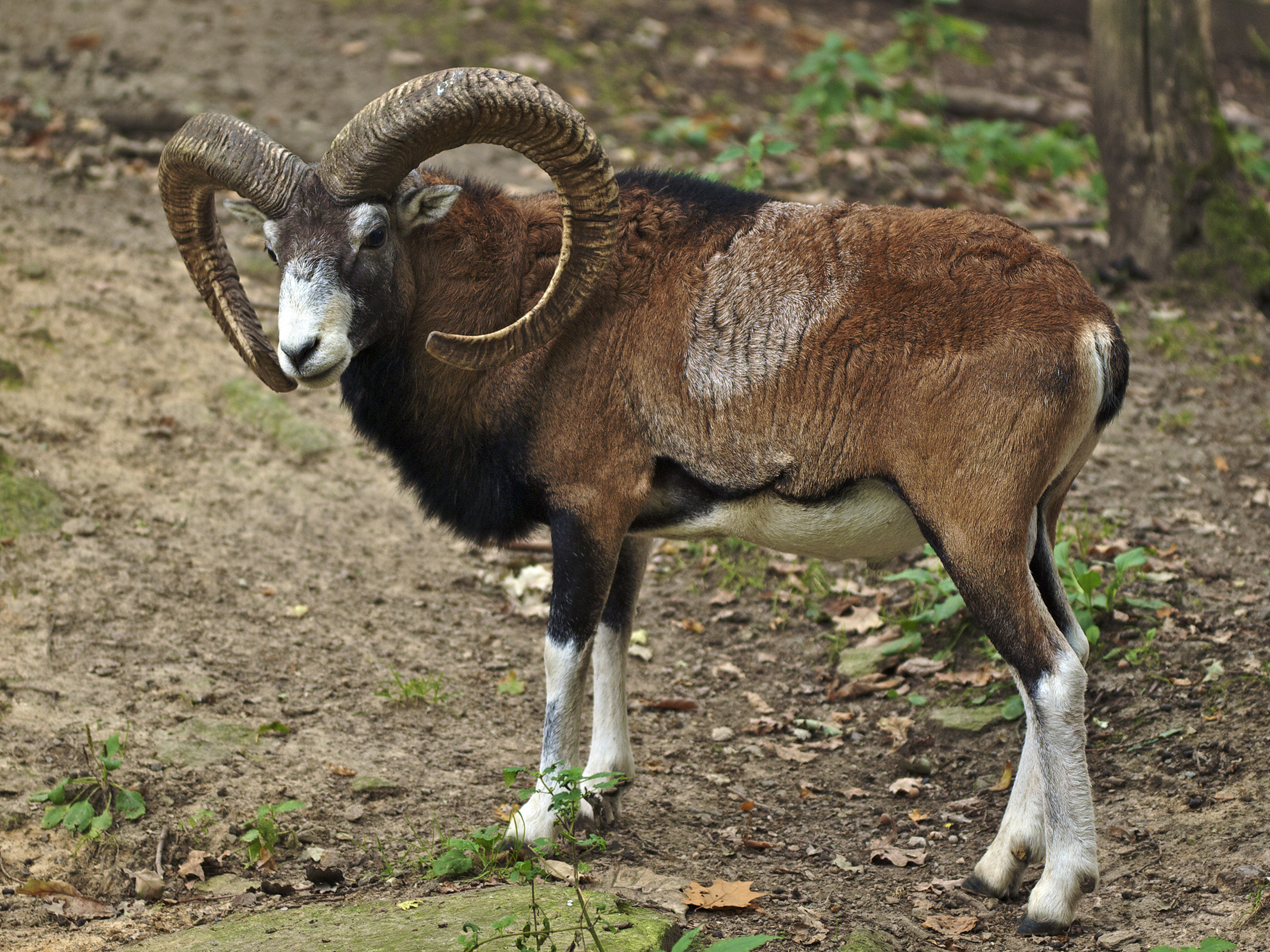
The Corsican mouflon, first introduced to the island in the Neolithic, is the origin of many populations now found on the European continent and the world.

This is a list of the mammal species recorded in Corsica, France.

The following tags are used to highlight each species' conservation status as assessed by the International Union for Conservation of Nature.

EX	Extinct	No reasonable doubt that the last individual has died.
EW	Extinct in the wild	Known only to survive in captivity or as a naturalized populations well outside its previous range.
CR	Critically endangered	The species is in imminent risk of extinction in the wild.
EN	Endangered	The species is facing an extremely high risk of extinction in the wild.
VU	Vulnerable	The species is facing a high risk of extinction in the wild.
NT	Near threatened	The species does not meet any of the criteria that would categorise it as risking extinction but it is likely to do so in the future.
LC	Least concern	There are no current identifiable risks to the species.
DD	Data deficient	There is inadequate information to make an assessment of the risks to this species.

== Subclass: Theria ==
=== Infraclass: Eutheria ===
==== Order: Rodentia (rodents) ====
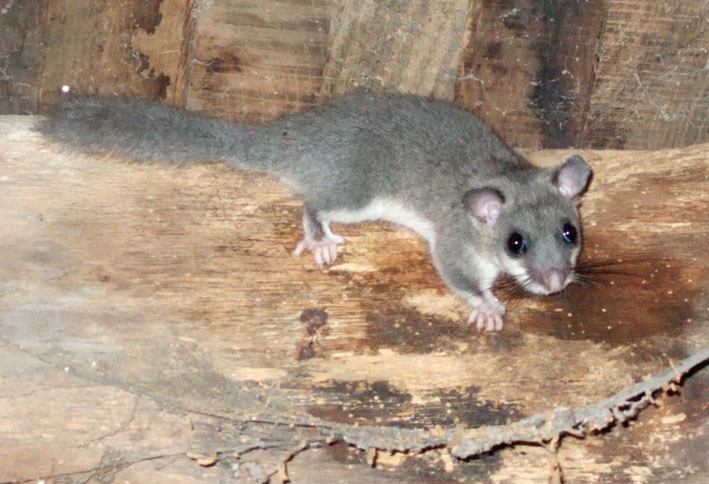
Edible dormouse

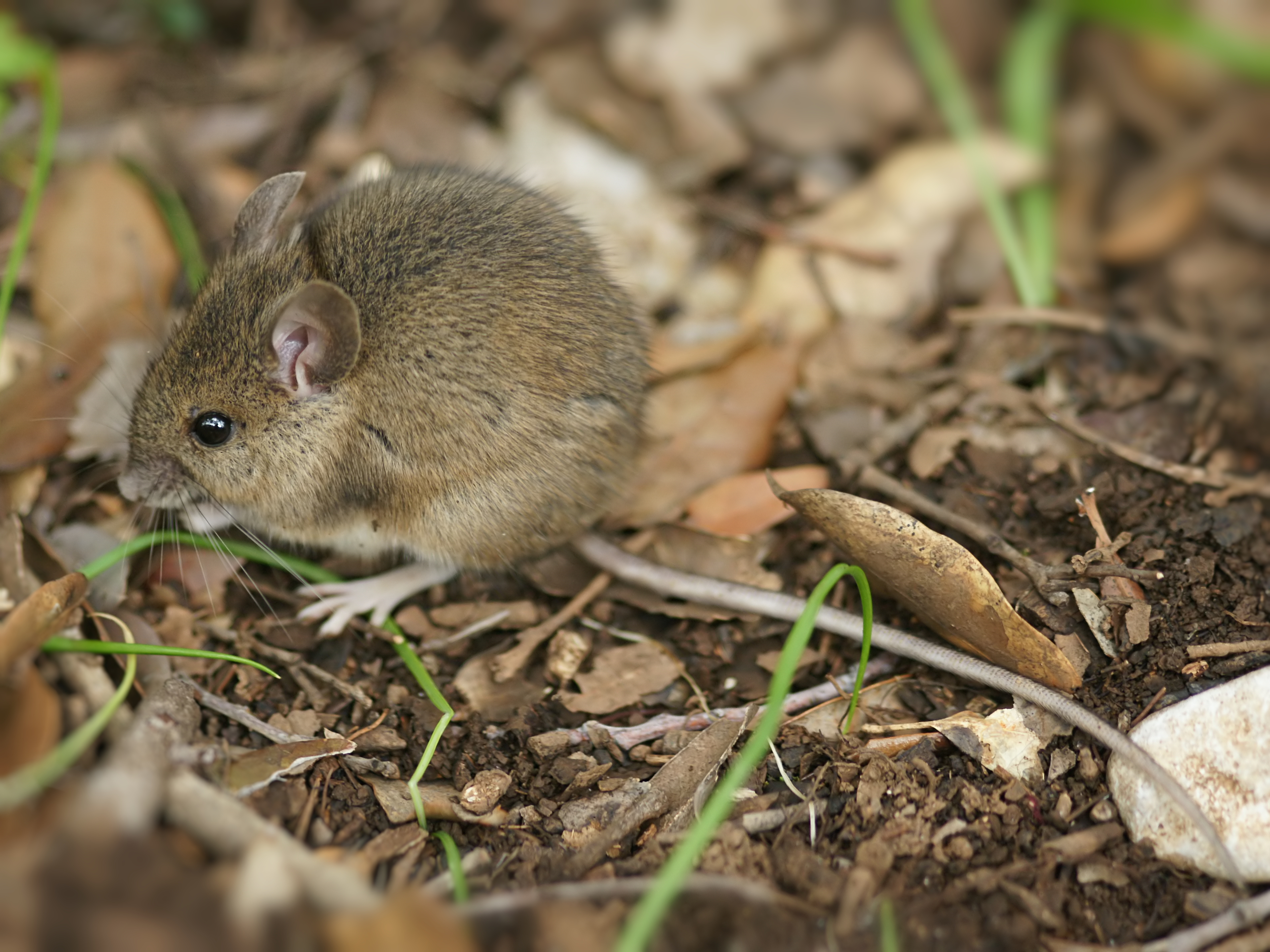
Wood mouse

Rodents make up the largest order of mammals, with over 40% of mammalian species. They have two incisors in the upper and lower jaw which grow continually and must be kept short by gnawing.

- Suborder: Sciuromorpha
  - Family: Gliridae (dormice)
    - Subfamily: Glirinae
      - Genus: Glis
        - Edible dormouse, G. glis LC
    - Subfamily: Leithiinae
      - Genus: Eliomys
        - Garden dormouse, E. quercinus LC
- Suborder: Myomorpha
  - Family: Muridae (mice and rats)
    - Subfamily: Murinae
      - Genus: Apodemus
        - Wood mouse, A. sylvaticus LC
      - Genus: Mus
        - House mouse, M. musculus LC introduced
      - Genus: Rattus
        - Brown rat, R. norvegicus LC introduced
        - Black rat, R. rattus LC introduced

==== Order: Lagomorpha (lagomorphs) ====
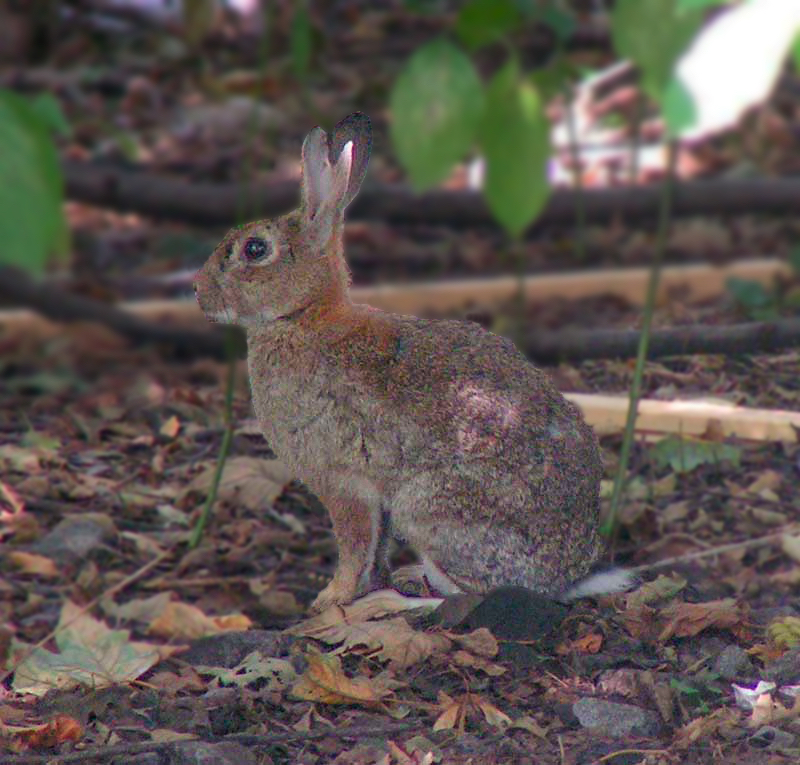
European rabbit

The lagomorphs comprise two families, Leporidae (hares and rabbits), and Ochotonidae (pikas). Though they can resemble rodents, and were classified as a superfamily in that order until the early 20th century, they have since been considered a separate order. They differ from rodents in a number of physical characteristics, such as having four incisors in the upper jaw rather than two.

- Family: Leporidae (rabbits, hares)
  - Genus: Oryctolagus
    - European rabbit, Oryctolagus cuniculus EN introduced
  - Genus: Lepus
    - Corsican hare, L. corsicanus VU introduced
    - European hare, L. europaeus LC introduced
- Family: Ochotonidae (pikas)
  - Genus: Prolagus
    - Sardinian pika, P. sardus EX

==== Order: Erinaceomorpha (hedgehogs and gymnures) ====
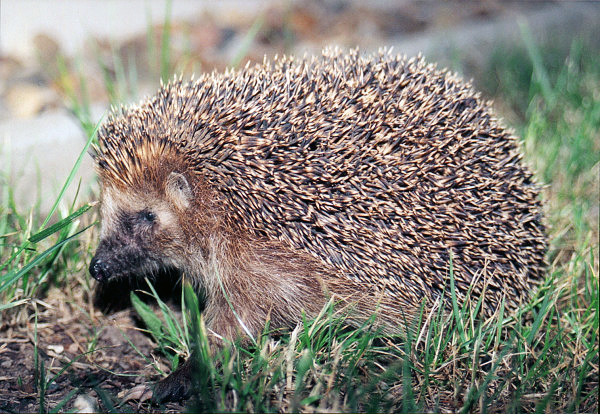
European hedgehog

The order Erinaceomorpha contains a single family, Erinaceidae, which comprise the hedgehogs and gymnures. The hedgehogs are easily recognised by their spines while gymnures look more like large rats.

- Family: Erinaceidae (hedgehogs)
  - Subfamily: Erinaceinae
    - Genus: Erinaceus
      - European hedgehog, Erinaceus europaeus LC

==== Order: Soricomorpha (shrews, moles, and solenodons) ====
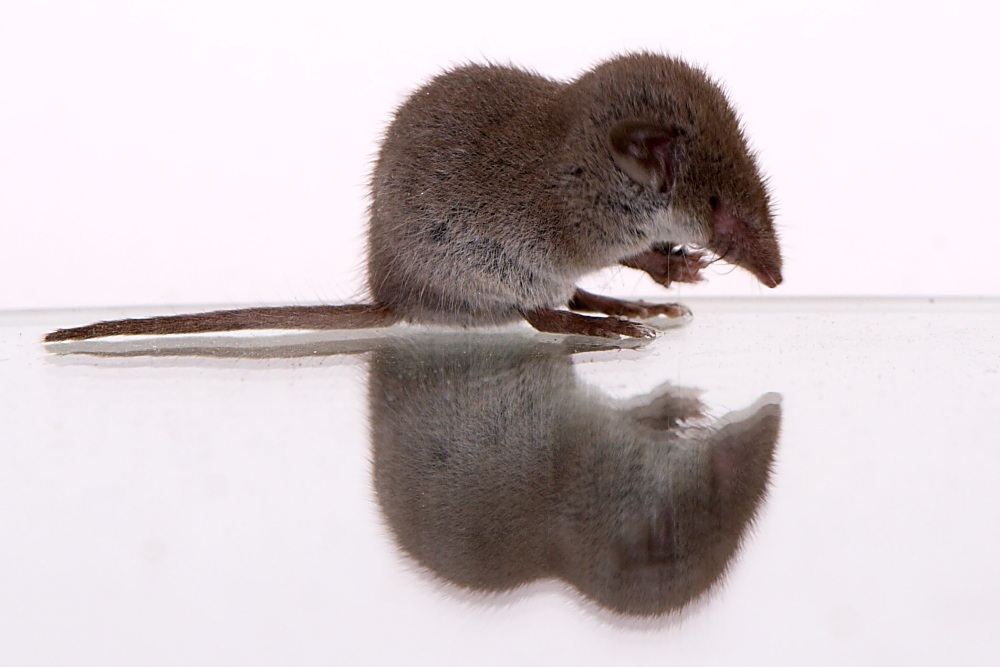
Lesser white-toothed shrew

The "shrew-forms" are insectivorous mammals. The shrews and solenodons closely resemble mice while the moles are stout bodied burrowers.

- Family: Soricidae (shrews)
  - Subfamily: Crocidurinae
    - Genus: Crocidura
      - Lesser white-toothed shrew, Crocidura suaveolens LC
    - Genus: Suncus
      - Etruscan shrew, Suncus etruscus LC

==== Order: Chiroptera (bats) ====
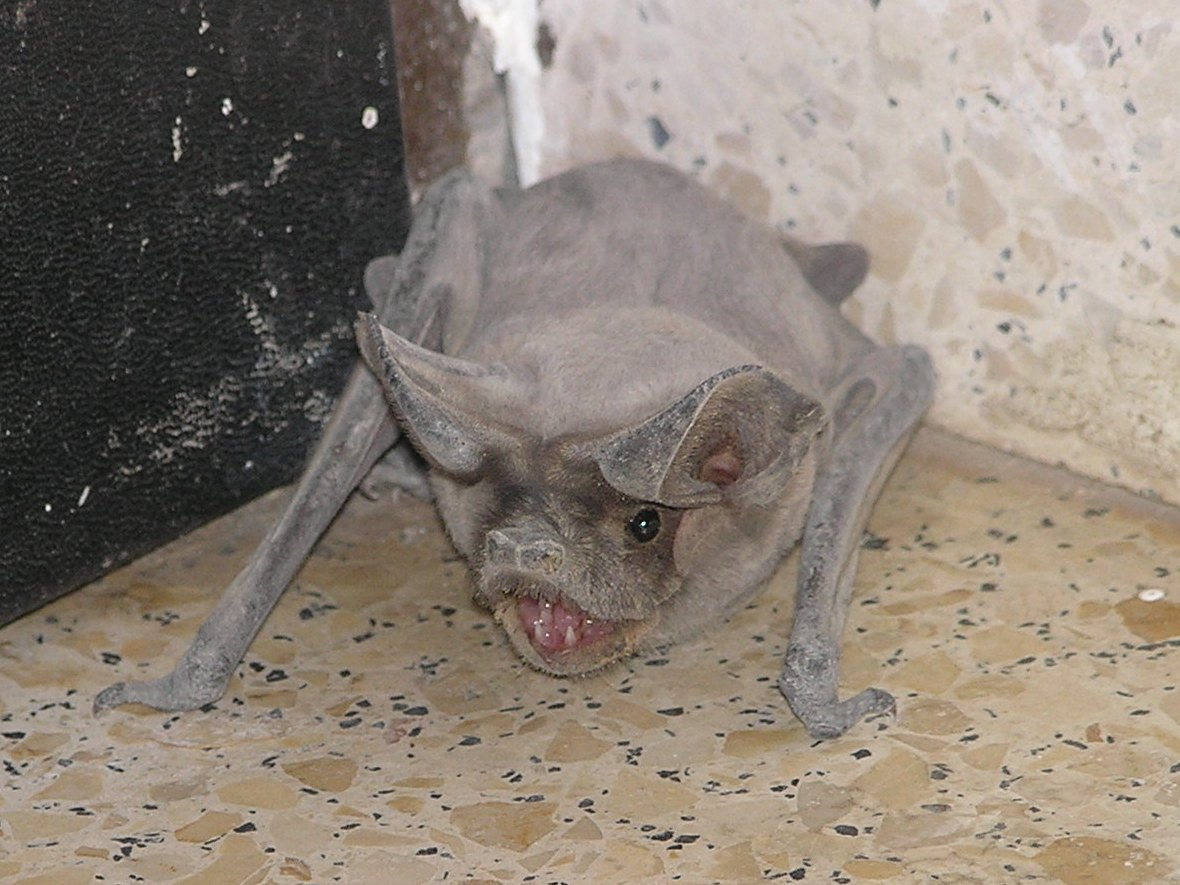
European free-tailed bat

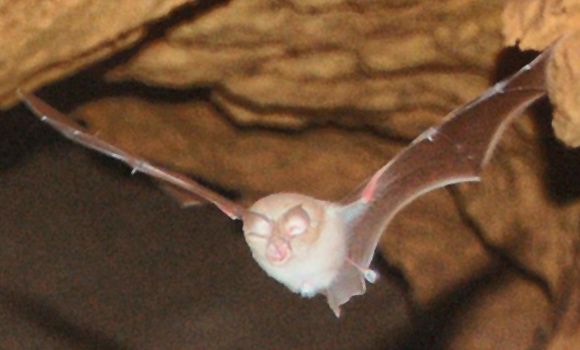
Mediterranean horseshoe bat

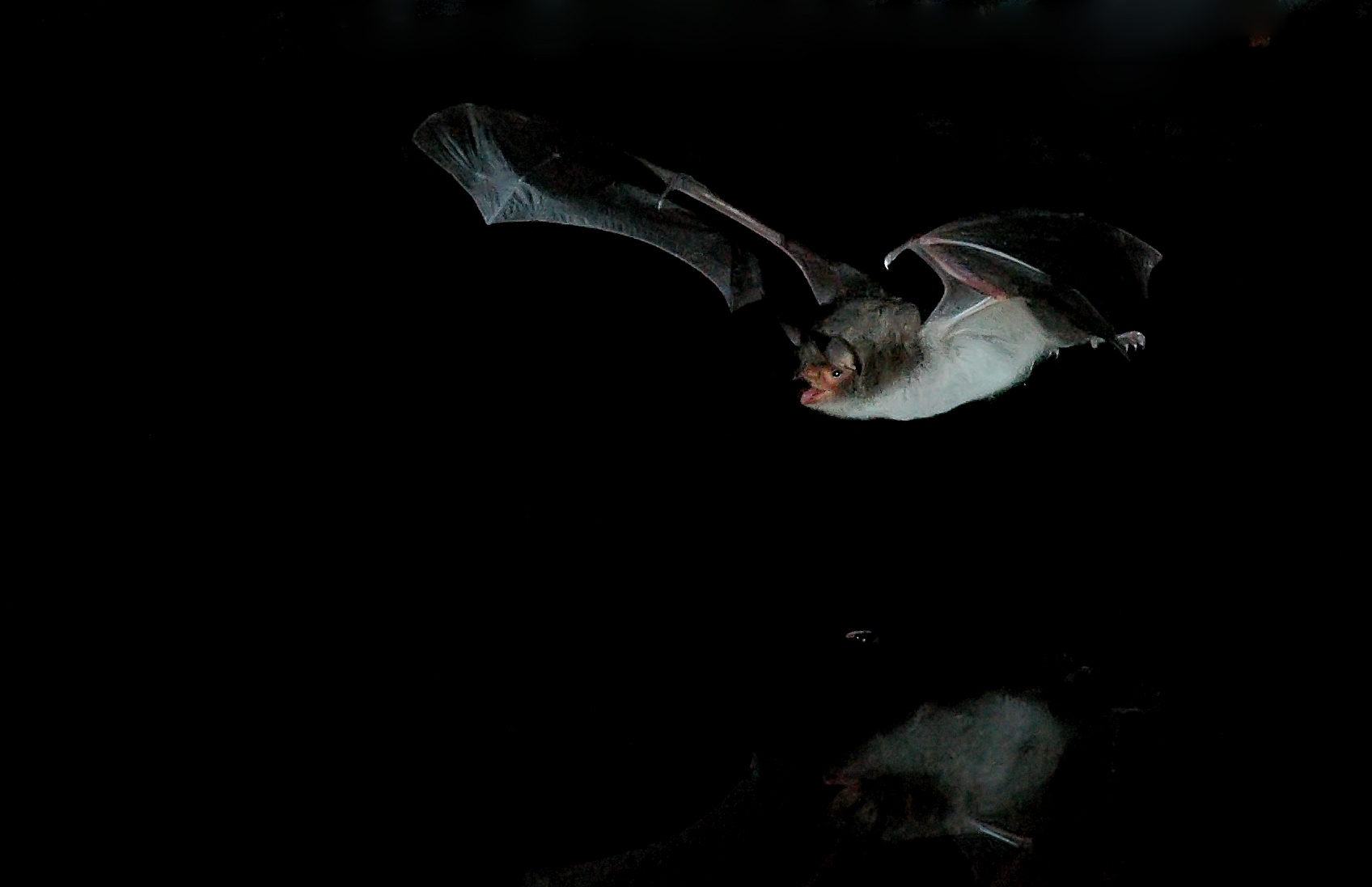
Long-fingered bat

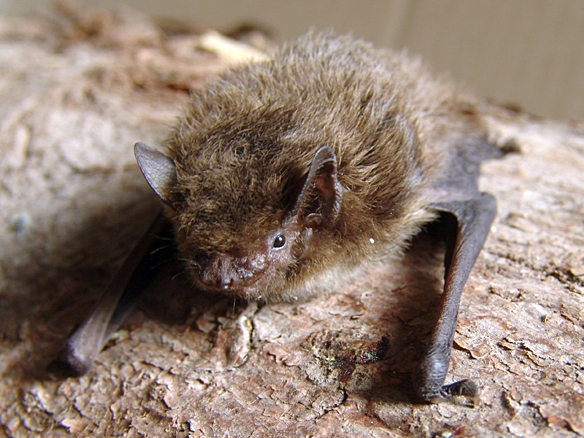
Nathusius's pipistrelle

The bats' most distinguishing feature is that their forelimbs are developed as wings, making them the only mammals capable of flight. Bat species account for about 20% of all mammals.

- Family: Miniopteridae (long-winged bats)
  - Subfamily: Miniopterinae
    - Genus: Miniopterus
      - Common bent-wing bat, Minioterus schreibersii NT
- Family: Molossidae (free-tailed bats)
  - Subfamily: Molossinae
    - Genus: Tadarida
      - European free-tailed bat, Tadarida teniotis LC
- Family: Rhinolophidae (horseshoe bats)
  - Subfamily: Rhinolophinae
    - Genus: Rhinolophus
      - Mediterranean horseshoe bat, Rhinolophus euryale VU
      - Greater horseshoe bat, Rhinolophus ferrumequinum NT
      - Lesser horseshoe bat, Rhinolophus hipposideros NT
- Family: Vespertilionidae (mouse-eared bats)
  - Subfamily: Myotinae
    - Genus: Myotis
      - Bechstein's bat, Myotis bechsteinii NT
      - Long-fingered bat, Myotis capaccinii VU
      - Daubenton's bat, Myotis daubentonii LC
      - Geoffroy's bat, Myotis emarginatus LC
      - Whiskered bat, Myotis mystacinus LC
      - Natterer's bat, Myotis nattereri LC
      - Felten's myotis, Myotis punicus NT
  - Subfamily: Verpertilioninae
    - Genus: Barbastella
      - Barbastelle, Barbastella barbastellus NT
    - Genus: Eptesicus
      - Serotine bat, Eptesicus serotinus LC
    - Genus: Hypsugo
      - Savi's pipistrelle, Hypsugo savii LC
    - Genus: Nyctalus
      - Lesser noctule, Nyctalus leisleri LC
    - Genus: Plecotus
      - Grey long-eared bat, Plecotus austriacus LC
    - Genus: Pipistrellus
      - Kuhl's pipistrelle, Pipistrellus kuhlii LC
      - Nathusius's pipistrelle, Pipistrellus nathusii LC
      - Common pipistrelle, Pipistrellus pipistrellus LC
      - Soprano pipistrelle, Pipistrellus pygmaeus LC

==== Order: Cetacea (whales) ====
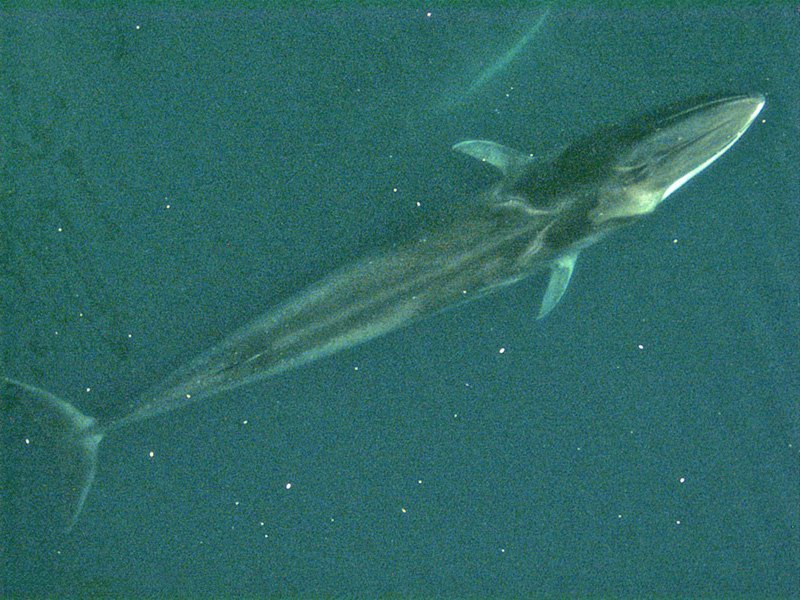
Fin whale

Killer whale

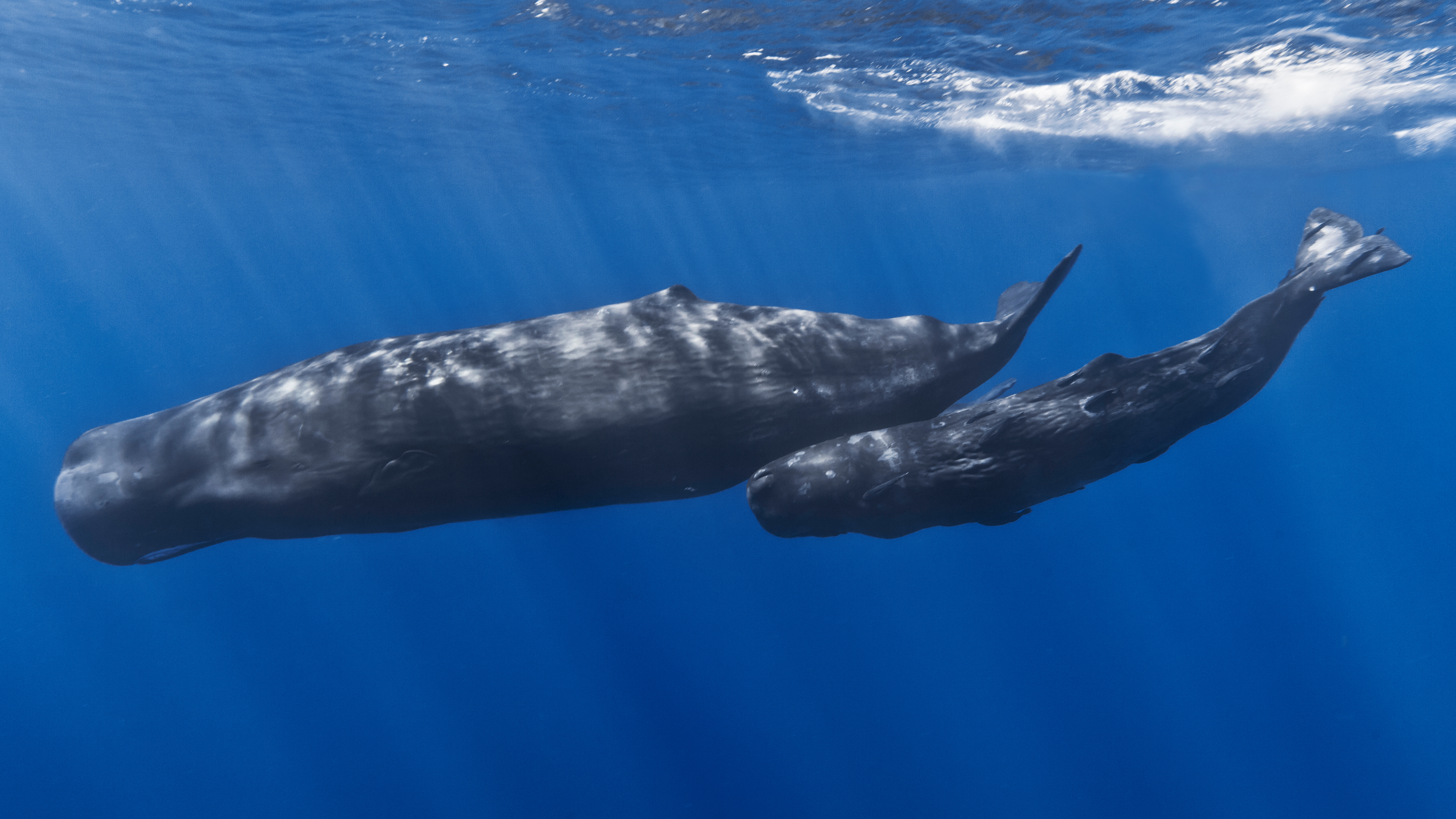
Sperm whale and calf

The order Cetacea includes whales, dolphins and porpoises. They are the mammals most fully adapted to aquatic life with a spindle-shaped nearly hairless body, protected by a thick layer of blubber, and forelimbs and tail modified to provide propulsion underwater.

- Suborder: Mysticeti
  - Family: Balaenopteridae (rorquals)
    - Genus: Balaenoptera
      - Common minke whale, Balaenoptera acutorostrata LC
      - Fin whale, Balaenoptera physalus VU
- Suborder: Odontoceti
  - Family: Delphinidae (dolphins and pilot whales)
    - Genus: Delphinus
      - Short-beaked common dolphin, Delphinus delphis EN
    - Genus: Grampus
      - Risso's dolphin, Grampus griseus DD
    - Genus: Globicephala
      - Long-finned pilot whale, Globicephala melas DD
    - Genus: Orcinus
      - Killer whale, Orcinus orca DD
    - Genus: Stenella
      - Striped dolphin, Stenella coeruleoalba VU
    - Genus: Steno
      - Rough-toothed dolphin, Steno bredanensis LC
    - Genus: Tursiops
      - Common bottlenose dolphin, Tursiops truncatus VU
  - Family: Physeteridae (sperm whales)
    - Genus: Physeter
      - Sperm whale, Physeter macrocephalus EN
  - Family: Ziphiidae (beaked whales)
    - Genus: Ziphius
      - Cuvier's beaked whale, Ziphius cavirostris VU

==== Order: Carnivora (carnivorans) ====
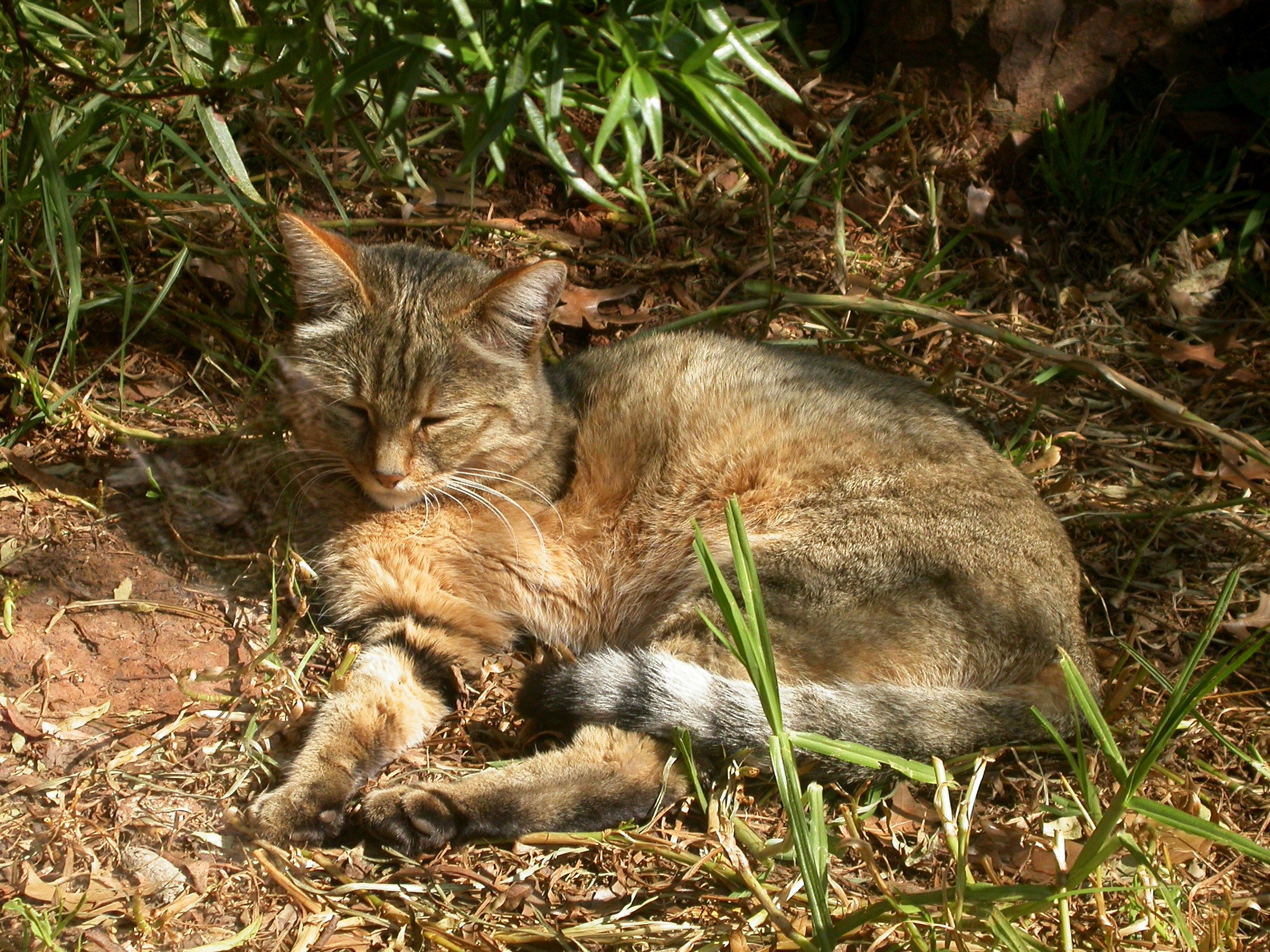
African wildcat

There are over 260 species of carnivorans, the majority of which feed primarily on meat. They have a characteristic skull shape and dentition.

- Suborder: Feliformia
  - Family: Felidae (cats)
    - Genus: Felis
      - Wildcat, Felis silvestris LC
- Suborder: Caniformia
  - Family: Canidae (dogs, foxes, wolves)
    - Genus: Vulpes
      - Red fox, Vulpes vulpes LC
  - Family: Mustelidae (weasels)
    - Genus: Mustela
      - Least weasel, Mustela nivalis LC
    - Genus: Martes
      - European pine marten, Martes martes LC
  - Family: Phocidae (earless seals)
    - Genus: Monachus
      - Mediterranean monk seal, M. monachus EN possibly extirpated

==== Order: Artiodactyla (even-toed ungulates) ====
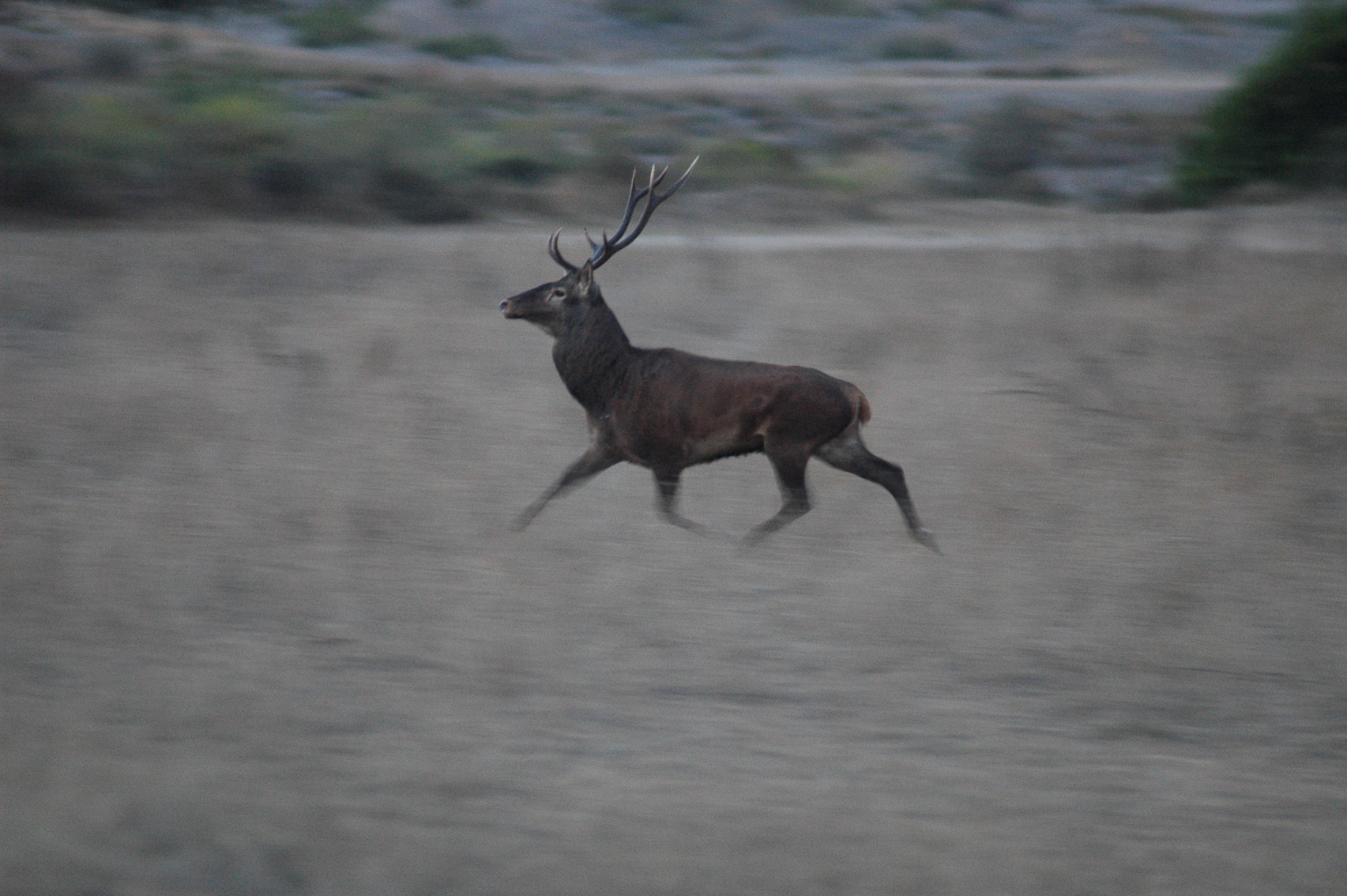
The Corsican red deer is the smallest subspecies of red deer

The even-toed ungulates are ungulates whose weight is borne about equally by the third and fourth toes, rather than mostly or entirely by the third as in perissodactyls. There are about 220 artiodactyl species, including many that are of great economic importance to humans.

- Family: Suidae (pigs)
  - Subfamily: Suinae
    - Genus: Sus
      - Wild boar, S. scrofa LC
- Family: Bovidae (cattle, antelope, sheep, goats)
  - Subfamily: Caprinae
    - Genus: Ovis
      - European mouflon, Ovis aries musimon
- Family: Cervidae (deer)
  - Subfamily: Cervinae
    - Genus: Cervus
      - Red deer, C. elaphus LC
        - Corsican red deer, C. e. corsicanus

== See also ==
- List of chordate orders
- Lists of mammals by region
- List of prehistoric mammals
- Mammal classification
- List of mammals described in the 2000s
