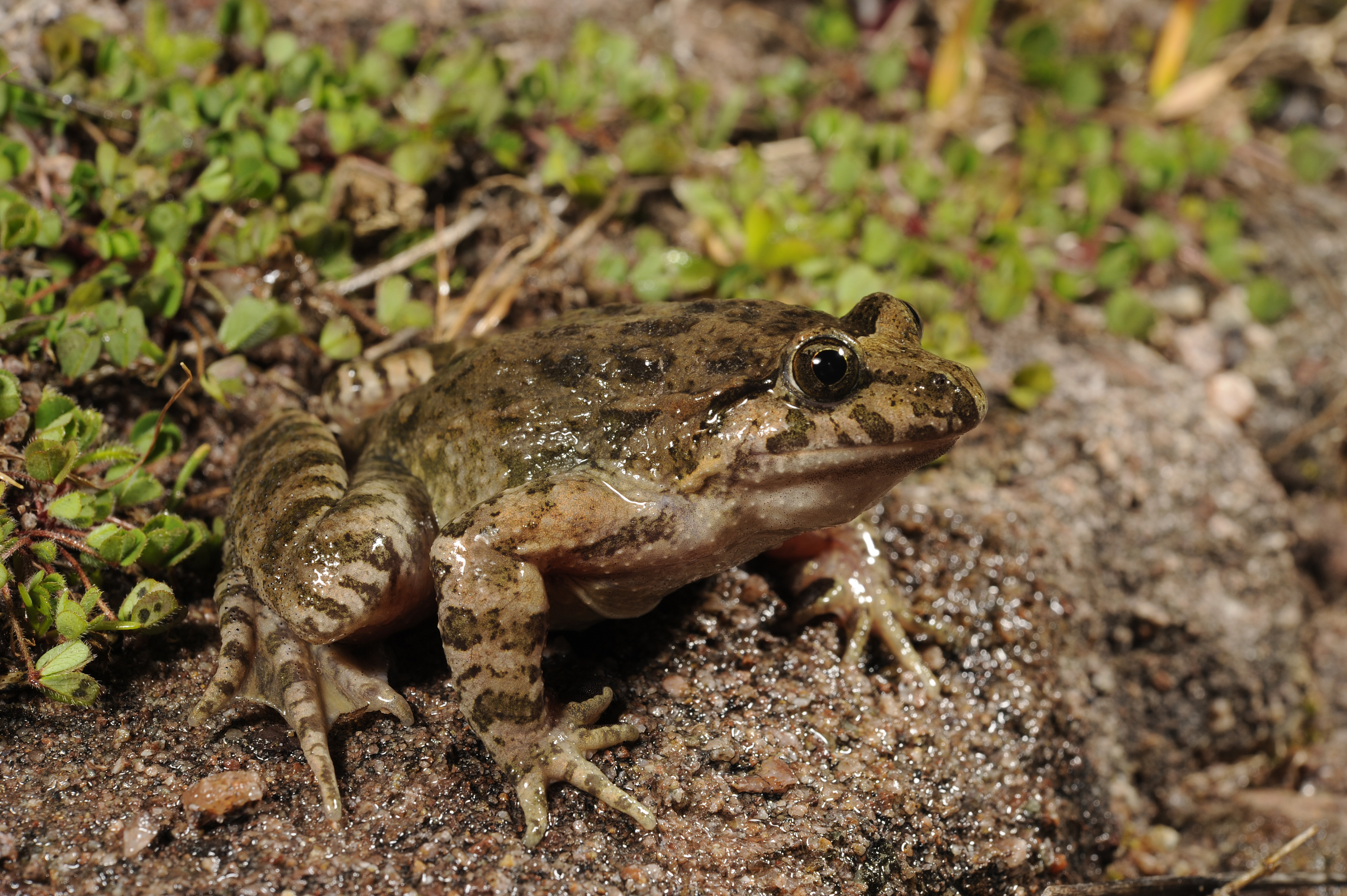

Conservation status
- Least Concern (IUCN 3.1)

Scientific classification
- Kingdom: Animalia
- Phylum: Chordata
- Class: Amphibia
- Order: Anura
- Family: Alytidae
- Genus: Discoglossus
- Species: D. sardus

Binomial name
- Discoglossus sardus Tschudi, 1837
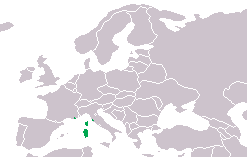

= Tyrrhenian painted frog =

Species of amphibian

The Tyrrhenian painted frog (Discoglossus sardus) is a species of frog in the family Alytidae (formerly Discoglossidae).

Endemic to the Tyrrhenian Sea basin, it is found in a handful of Western Mediterranean islands, namely Sardinia, Corsica, and the Tuscan Archipelago. A species with high stakes in terms of conservation, it is very similar to the related Corsican painted frog, Discoglossus montalentii, with whom it shares part of its habitat in Corsica.

Its natural habitats are temperate forests, rivers, intermittent rivers, freshwater marshes, and intermittent freshwater marshes. It can be found from sea level up to more than 1 700 meters of altitude. Able to endure slight water pollution, it is nevertheless threatened by habitat loss.

The species isn't immediately threatened and is classified as Least Concern (LC) on the IUCN Red List. It still fragile and subject to several threats justifying strong conservation efforts in both France and Italy, where it is fully protected and part of Annex 2 of the Habitats Directive. On top of habitat loss caused by urbanization, the species is sensible to chytridiomycosis, a skin disease threatening amphibian species across the globe.

Not well known from the wider public, the Tyrrhenian painted frog figures among the emblematic species of several protected area, including the Port-Cros National Park in France.

== Description ==
The Tyrrhenian painted frog is a short amphibian species of robust build, ranging from 5 to 7.5 cm (2.0 to 3.0 in) in length.

Its color varies from dark brown to grey, black or reddish brown. Lighter spots are very commonplace, with plain individuals being rare. Most of the time, a large light spot is present between the shoulders and a large dark spot between the eyes, with a lighter, straight front edge. A bright crescent-shaped spot can sometimes be present on the top of the head between the snout and the midpoint of the eyes, near the shoulder girdle.

The belly is yellowish to cream white. The pupil is shaped like a reverse droplet, with the iris divided between a lighter golden upper half and a darker lower half, as characteristic of Discoglossus. As with other species of the genus, the eardrum is barely visible.

Skin is most often smooth. However, during mating season, males present a dry, rough skin. Soft warts are present on the neck and limbs, often in line patterns. The head is larger than it is wide, with the snout being slightly pointed and thinned out - noticeably more so than D. montalentii. The fourth finger of its front foot is spatulated rather than tapering and its hind legs are shorter.

== Distribution and habitat ==
The Tyrrhenian painted frog is found in most parts of the islands of Corsica and Sardinia, but it is not present in the central highlands. It is also present on several small islands in the Tyrrhenian Sea, such as Iles d'Hyères, Giglio, Montecristo, and the Monte Argentario peninsula in Tuscany. Its habitats include coastal plains, forest streams, maquis shrubland, and upland coniferous forests. Slow streams and pools are used for breeding, and this frog can tolerate brackish water.

== Biology ==
Like other members of its family, the Corsican painted frog eats small invertebrates. Whether observations of this frog in the past were of D. sardus or D. montalentii is unclear, because they are so similar in appearance and were only recognised as different species in the late 20th century. Consequently, its reproductive habits are uncertain, but it is believed to lay its eggs in small groups or singly on the bottom of watercourses. They are brownish-black and 1 to 1.5 mm (0.04 to 0.06 in) in diameter with a thick, gelatinous casing.

== Status ==
The IUCN has listed this frog as being of least concern. The populations in Corsica and Sardinia seem stable, but mainland populations are decreasing and populations on smaller islands may suffer from lack of genetic diversity. The main threats faced by this frog are degradation of its woodland and aquatic habitats, but it seems adaptable and able to tolerate some disturbance to its habitat.
