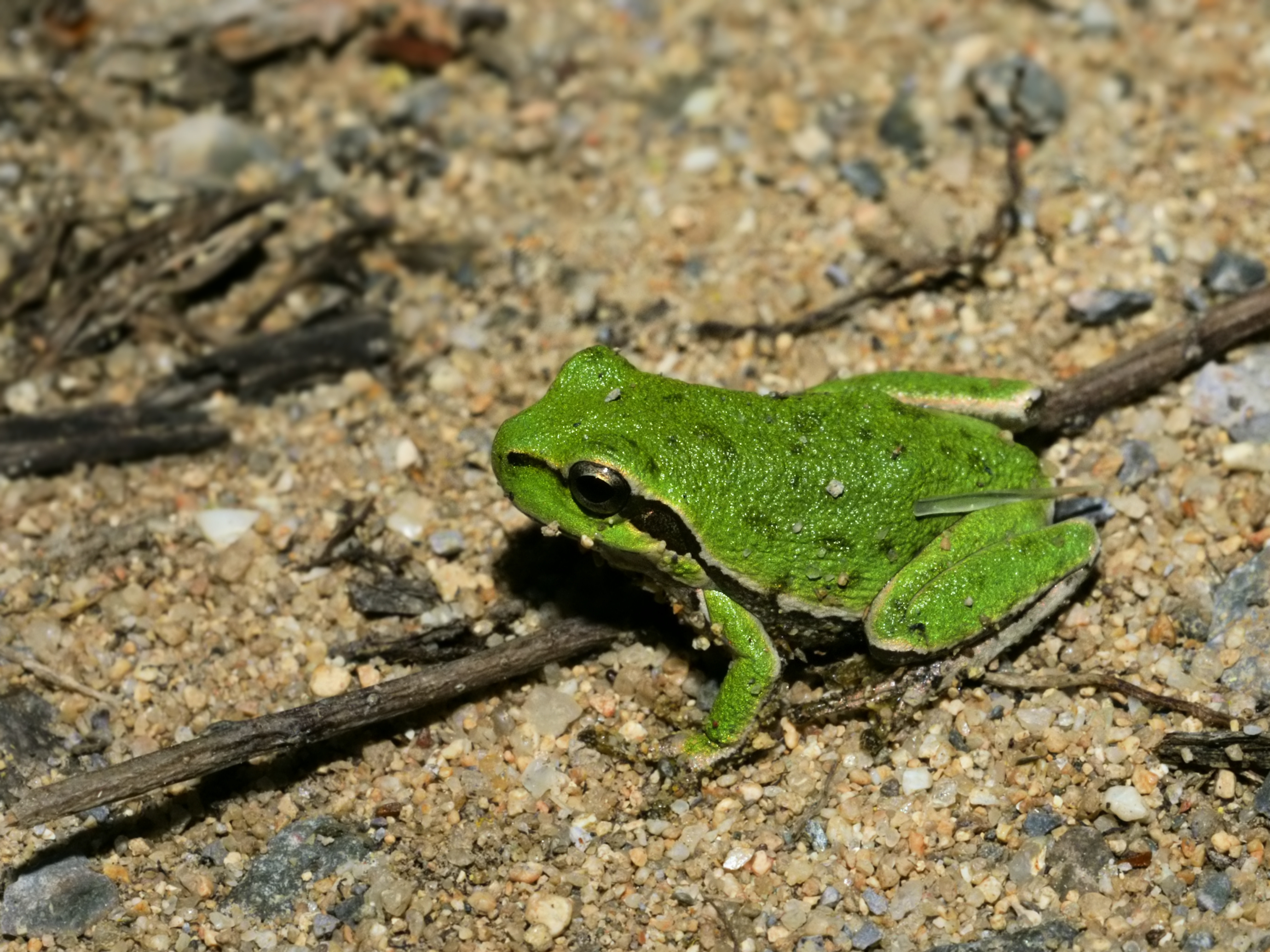

Conservation status
- Least Concern (IUCN 3.1)

Scientific classification
- Kingdom: Animalia
- Phylum: Chordata
- Class: Amphibia
- Order: Anura
- Family: Hylidae
- Genus: Hyla
- Species: H. sarda

Binomial name
- Hyla sarda (De Betta, 1853)

= Sardinian tree frog =

Species of amphibian

The Sardinian tree frog or Tyrrhenian tree frog (Hyla sarda) is a species of frog in the family Hylidae, found in Corsica, Sardinia, and the Tuscan Archipelago.

Its natural habitats are temperate forests, temperate shrubland, rivers, intermittent rivers, freshwater marshes, intermittent freshwater marshes, and urban areas.
