= Palace of Versailles =

Former royal residence in Versailles, France

- Château de Versailles (French)
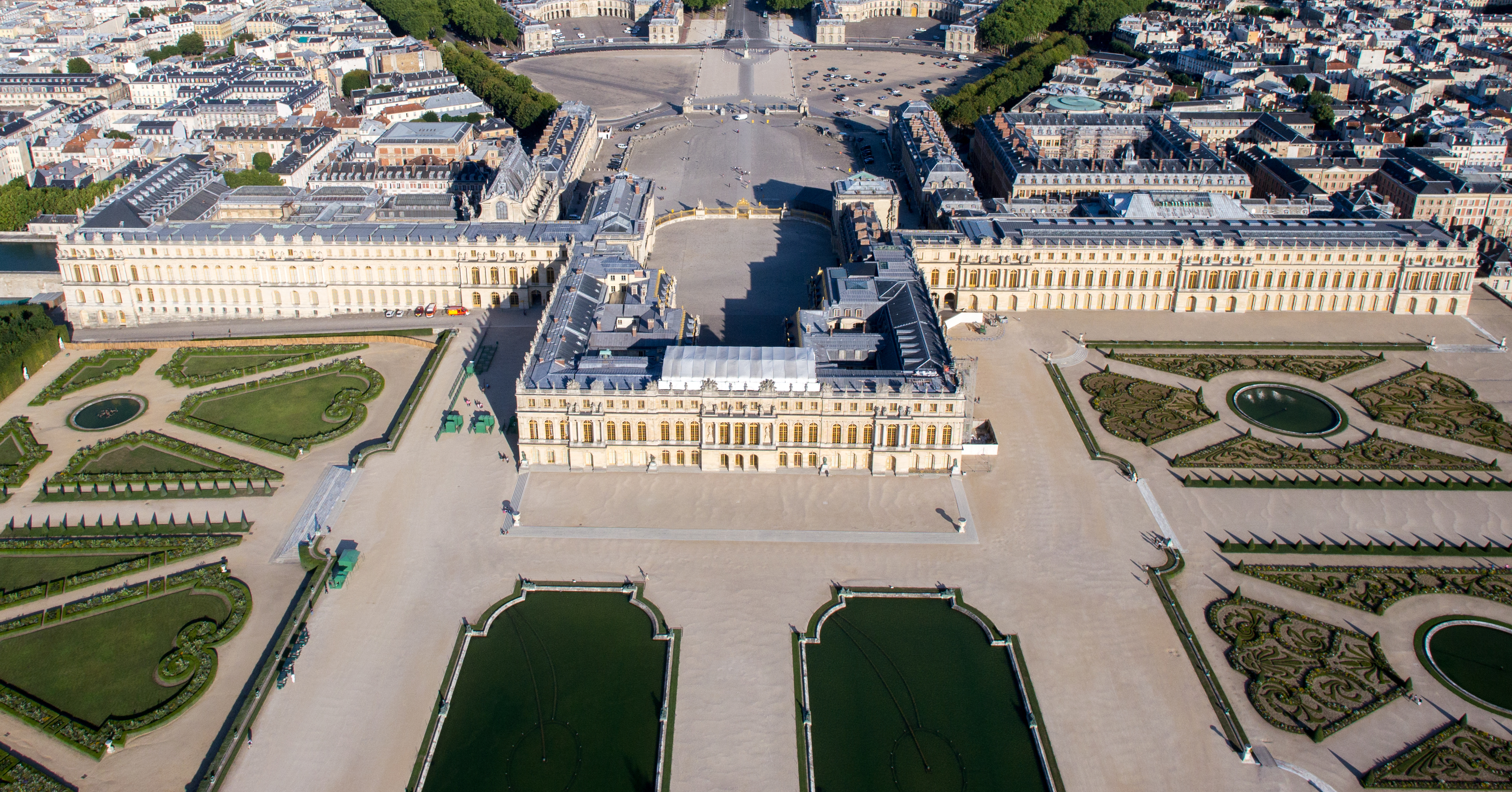
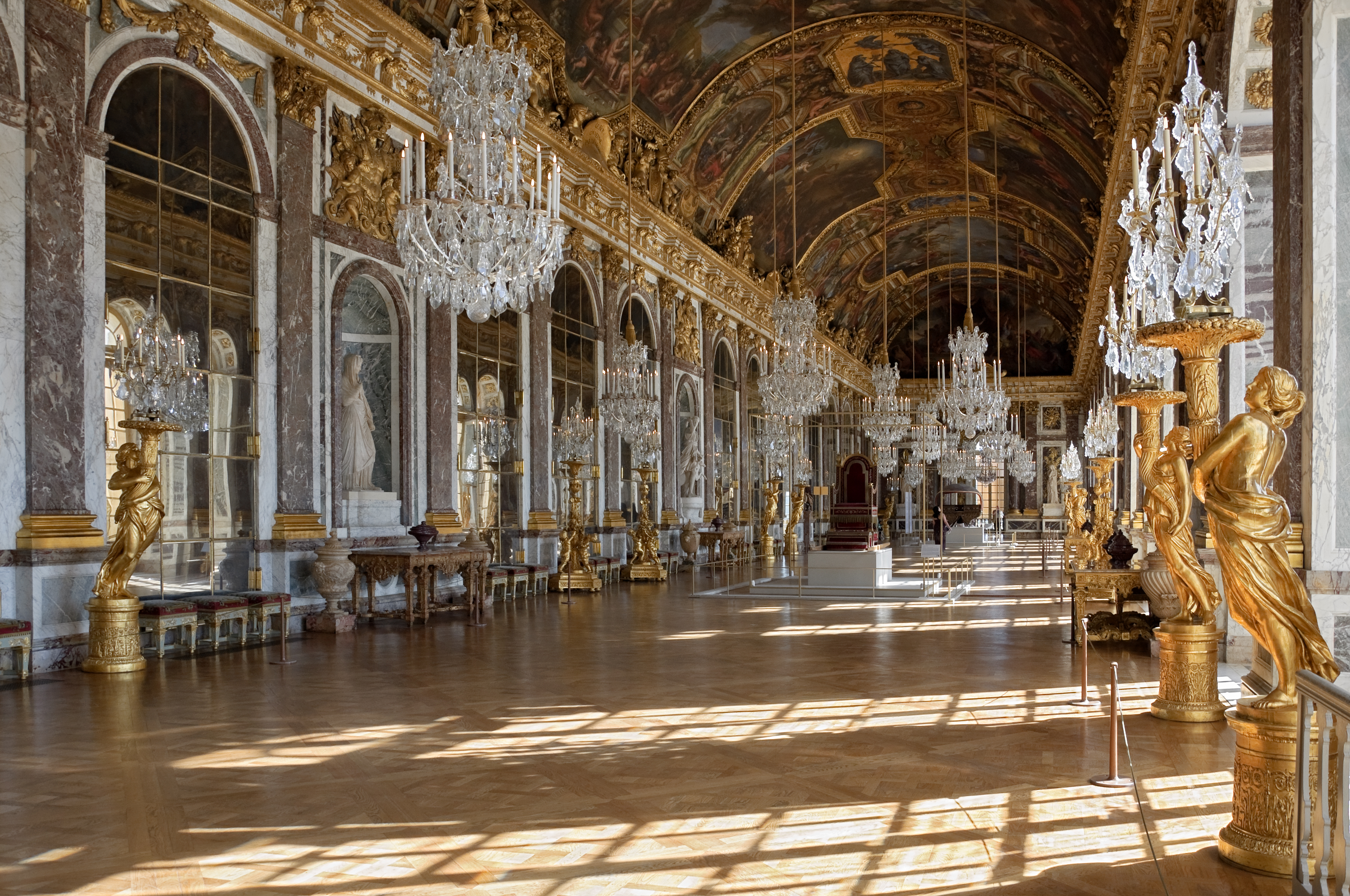
- Garden façade; Hall of Mirrors
- Interactive fullscreen map

General information
- Architectural style: French classicism
- Location: Versailles, France
- Coordinates: 48°48′17″N 2°07′13″E
- Construction started: 1661; 365 years ago
- Owner: French State

Website
- en.chateauversailles.fr

UNESCO World Heritage Site
- Official name: Chateau and Park of Versailles
- Criteria: Cultural: i, ii, vi
- Reference: 83
- Inscription: 1979 (3rd Session)
- Area: 800 ha (2,000 acres)
- Buffer zone: 9,467 ha (23,390 acres)

The Palace of Versailles (Note: /vɛərˈsaɪ, vɜːrˈsaɪ/ vair-SY, vur-SY) (French: Château de Versailles) (Note: French pronunciation: [ʃɑto d(ə) vɛʁsɑj]) is a château and historic monument in Versailles in the Yvelines department of France, southwest of Paris. It served as the principal residence of the French kings Louis XIV, Louis XV, and Louis XVI.

The king, the court, and the royal government lived there permanently from 6 May 1682 until 6 October 1789, except during the Regency years (1715–1723). Conceived by Louis XIV to glorify the French monarchy, the palace became the most important architectural project of his reign and is considered one of the masterpieces of French classical architecture. It exerted major influence across Europe in the 18th and 19th centuries in architecture and the decorative arts.

The palace forms a vast and complex ensemble of courtyards and buildings designed to maintain architectural harmony. It covers about 63,154 square metres and contains roughly 2,300 rooms, around 1,000 of which belong to the National Museum of the History of France housed in the Palace and the Trianons.

The park of the Palace of Versailles covers 815 hectares today, compared with more than 8,000 hectares before the French Revolution. Of this area, 93 hectares are formal gardens. The estate includes numerous features, such as the Petit Trianon and Grand Trianon—later used by Napoleon I, Louis XVIII, Charles X, Louis Philippe I, and Napoleon III—as well as the Hameau de la Reine, the Grand and Petit Canal, a former menagerie, the Orangerie, and the Pièce d'Eau des Suisses. As one of the most visited sites in Europe, the estate is central to ongoing discussions about managing overtourism.

== Location ==
The Palace of Versailles is located in the north‑west part of the commune of Versailles, on the Place d’Armes, about 16 kilometres south‑west of Paris. The term “Palace of Versailles” refers both to the main palace building and its immediate surroundings, as well as to the entire Versailles estate, which includes — among other elements — the Grand Trianon, the Petit Trianon, the Grand Canal, and the palace park.

== History ==
The site of Versailles is first mentioned in 1038 in a charter of the Abbey of Saint‑Père de Chartres. During the Middle Ages, the area consisted of small villages, farmland, and woodland. In the 16th century, the lands that would become Versailles were owned by the Gondi family, who were influential at the French court. Louis XIII acquired part of the land in 1623 and purchased the remainder in 1632.

Before the later palace existed, Louis XIII built a modest brick‑and‑stone hunting lodge in 1623. The building consisted of a central block flanked by two wings and measured about 35 metres in length. Surrounded by marshland, it was sometimes mocked by contemporaries as the “chétif château” (“puny château”) or the “château de cartes” (“house of cards”) because of its red brick, white stone, and slate colours. The lodge included a small gallery, several rooms hung with tapestries, and a central salon that later became the location of Louis XIV’s bedchamber. In 1630, the château was the site of the political event known as the Day of the Dupes, during which Cardinal Richelieu regained the king’s favour.

After the death of Louis XIII in 1643, the estate fell into neglect for nearly two decades. The lodge and its grounds were poorly maintained, and disputes arose among the estate’s staff. The captain of the hunt, Louis Lenormand de Beaumont, was assassinated in 1660, contributing to the disorder on the estate.

Louis XIV began to take an interest in Versailles shortly after his marriage in 1660. He ordered the reorganization of the gardens, the dismissal of corrupt staff, and the repair of the buildings. His valet, Jérôme Blouin, was placed in charge of restoring order to the estate. These early improvements prepared the site for the larger construction campaigns that began in 1664.

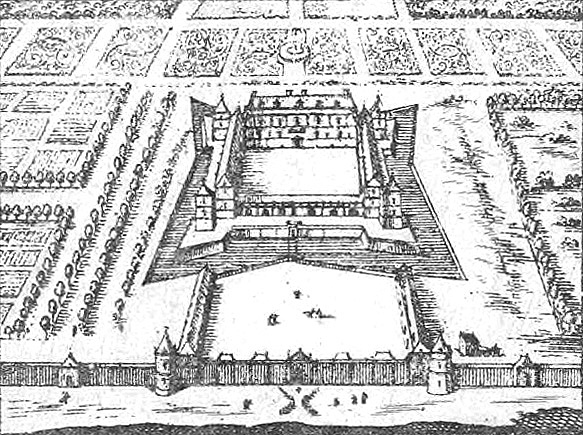
Versailles around 1652, engraving by Jacques Gomboust

In 1623, Louis XIII, king of France, built a hunting lodge on a hill in a favourite hunting ground, 19 kilometres (12 mi) west of Paris, and 16 kilometres (10 mi) from his primary residence, the Château de Saint-Germain-en-Laye. The site, near a village called Versailles, (Note: The name "Versailles", first used in 1038, from the Old French word versail, comes from the Latin word vertere; both mean "ploughed field".) was a wooded wetland that Louis XIII's court scorned as being generally unworthy of a king; one of his courtiers, François de Bassompierre, wrote that the lodge "would not inspire vanity in even the simplest gentleman". From 1631 to 1634, architect Philibert Le Roy replaced the lodge with a château for Louis XIII, who forbade his queen, Anne of Austria, from staying there overnight, even when an outbreak of smallpox at Saint-Germain-en-Laye in 1641 forced Louis XIII to relocate to Versailles with his three-year-old heir, the future Louis XIV.

When Louis XIII died in 1643, Anne became Louis XIV's regent, and Louis XIII's château was abandoned for the next decade. She moved the court back to Paris, where Anne and her chief minister, Cardinal Mazarin, continued Louis XIII's unpopular monetary practices. This led to the Fronde, a series of revolts against royal authority from 1648 to 1653 that masked a struggle between Mazarin and the princes of the blood, Louis XIV's extended family, for influence over him. In the aftermath of the Fronde, Louis XIV became determined to rule alone. Following Mazarin's death in 1661, Louis XIV reformed his government to exclude his mother and the princes of the blood, moved the court back to Saint-Germain-en-Laye, and ordered the expansion of his father's château at Versailles into a palace.

Louis XIV had hunted at Versailles in the 1650s, but did not take any special interest in Versailles until 1661. On 17 August 1661, Louis XIV was a guest at a sumptuous festival hosted by Nicolas Fouquet, the Superintendent of Finances, at his palatial residence, the Château de Vaux-le-Vicomte. Louis XIV was impressed by the château and its gardens, which were the work of Louis Le Vau, the court architect since 1654, André Le Nôtre, the royal gardener since 1657, and Charles Le Brun, a painter in royal service since 1647. Vaux-le-Vicomte's scale and opulence led him to imprison Fouquet that September, as he had also built an island fortress and a private army. But Louis XIV was also inspired by Vaux-le-Vicomte, and he recruited its authors for his own projects. Louis XIV replaced Fouquet with Jean-Baptiste Colbert, a protégé of Mazarin and enemy of Fouquet, and charged him with managing the corps of artisans in royal employment. Colbert acted as the intermediary between them and Louis XIV, who personally directed and inspected the planning and construction of Versailles.

=== Construction ===
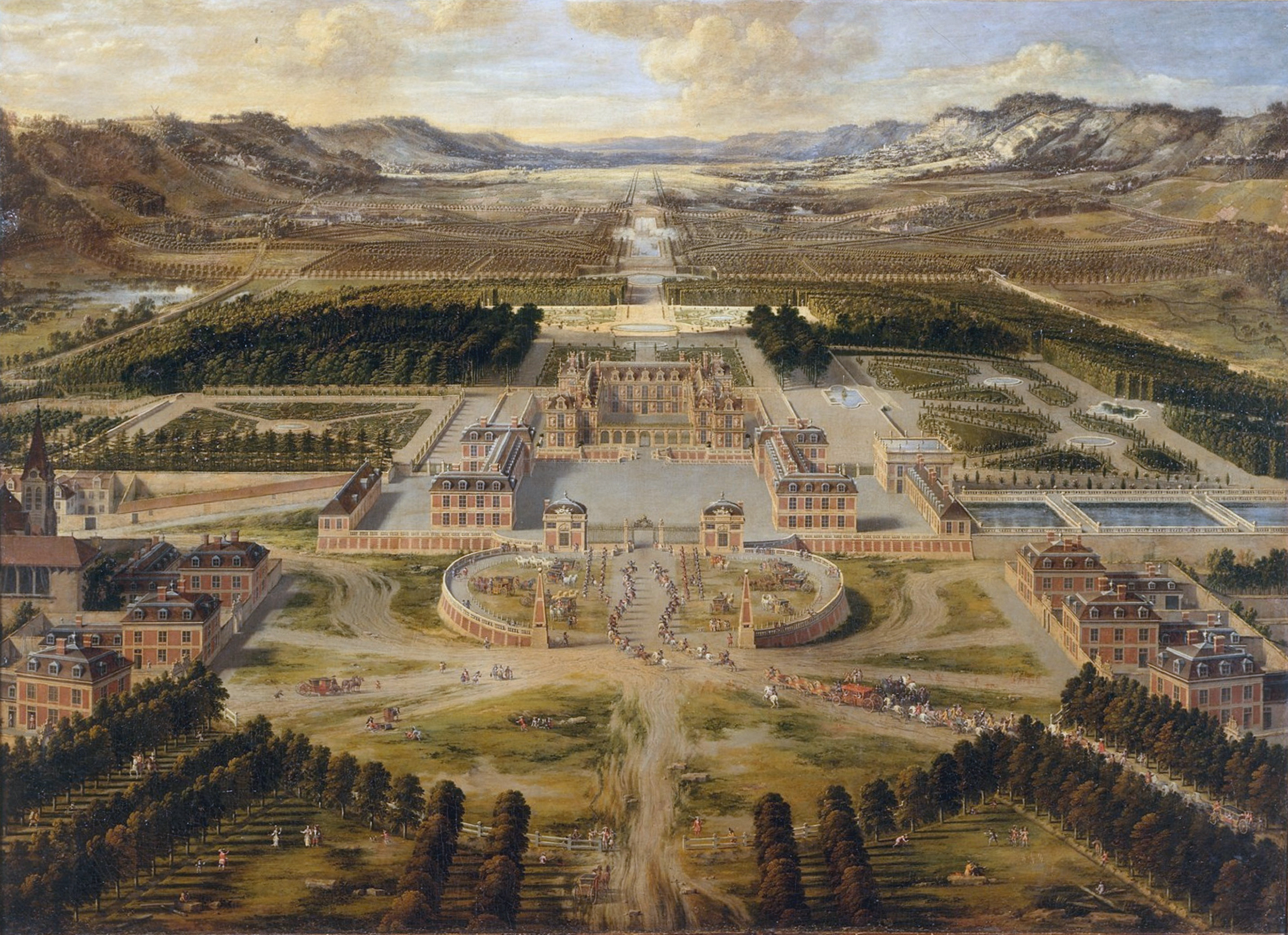
Versailles in 1668, painted by Pierre Patel

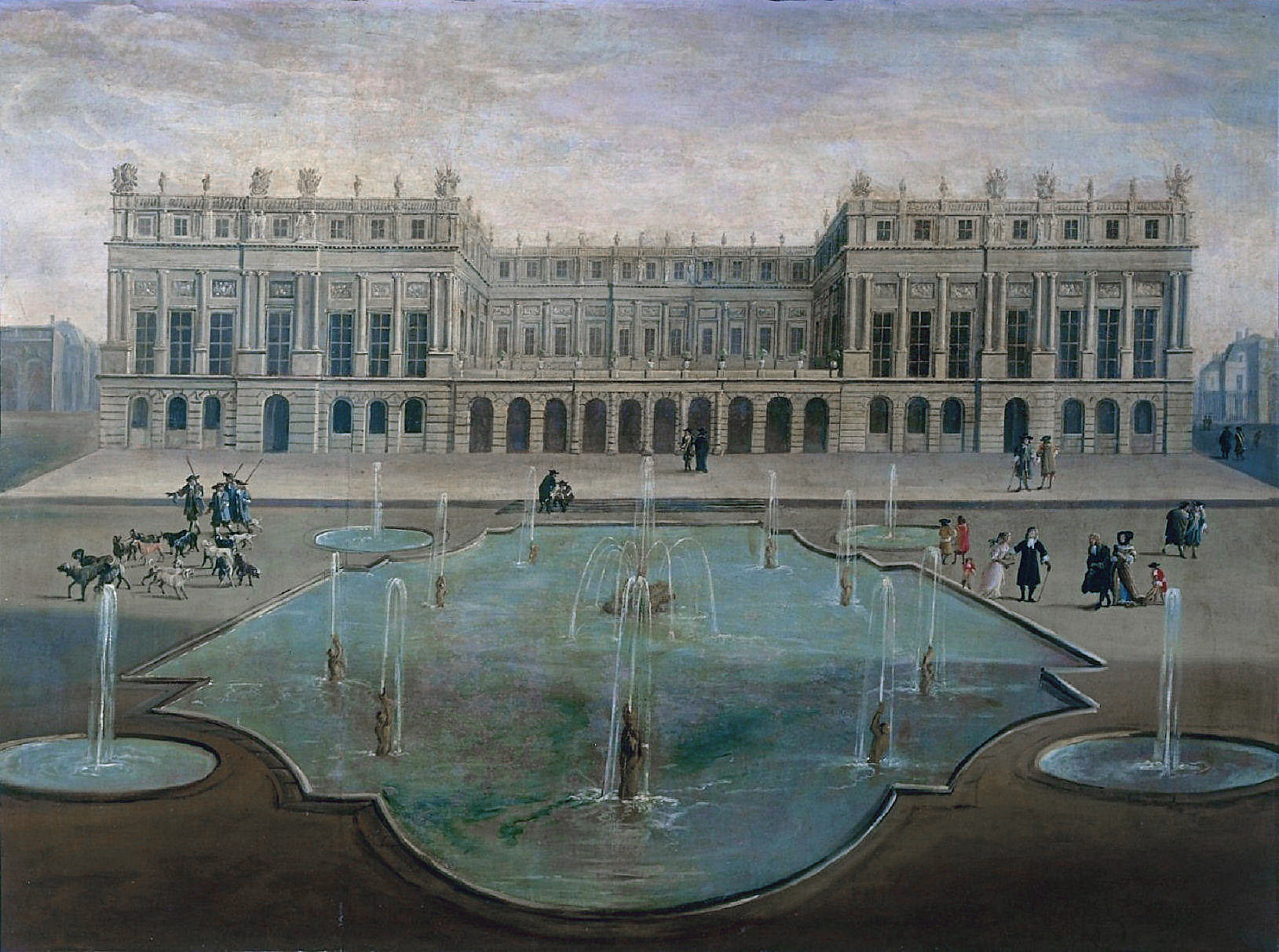
Le Vau's garden façade around 1675

Work at Versailles was at first concentrated on gardens, and through the 1660s, Le Vau only added two detached service wings and a forecourt to the château. But in 1668–69, as a response to the growth of the gardens, and the Treaty of Aix-la-Chapelle (1668), Louis XIV decided to turn Versailles into a full-scale royal residence. He vacillated between replacing or incorporating his father's château, but settled on the latter by the end of the decade, and from 1668 to 1671, Louis XIII's château was encased on three sides in a feature dubbed the enveloppe. This gave the château a new, Italianate façade overlooking the gardens, but preserved the courtyard façade, resulting in a mix of styles and materials that dismayed Louis XIV and that Colbert described as a "patchwork". Attempts to homogenize the two façades failed, and in 1670 Le Vau died, leaving the post of First Architect to the King vacant for the next seven years.

Le Vau was succeeded at Versailles by his assistant, architect François d'Orbay. Work at the palace during the 1670s focused on its interiors, as the palace was then nearing completion, though d'Orbay expanded Le Vau's service wings and connected them to the château, and built a pair of pavilions for government employees in the forecourt. In 1670, d'Orbay was tasked by Louis XIV with designing a city, also called Versailles, to house and service Louis XIV's growing government and court. The granting of land to courtiers for the construction of townhouses that resembled the palace began in 1671. The next year, the Franco-Dutch War began and funding for Versailles was cut until 1674, when Louis XIV had work begun on the Ambassadors' Staircase, a grand staircase for the reception of guests, and demolished the last of the village of Versailles.

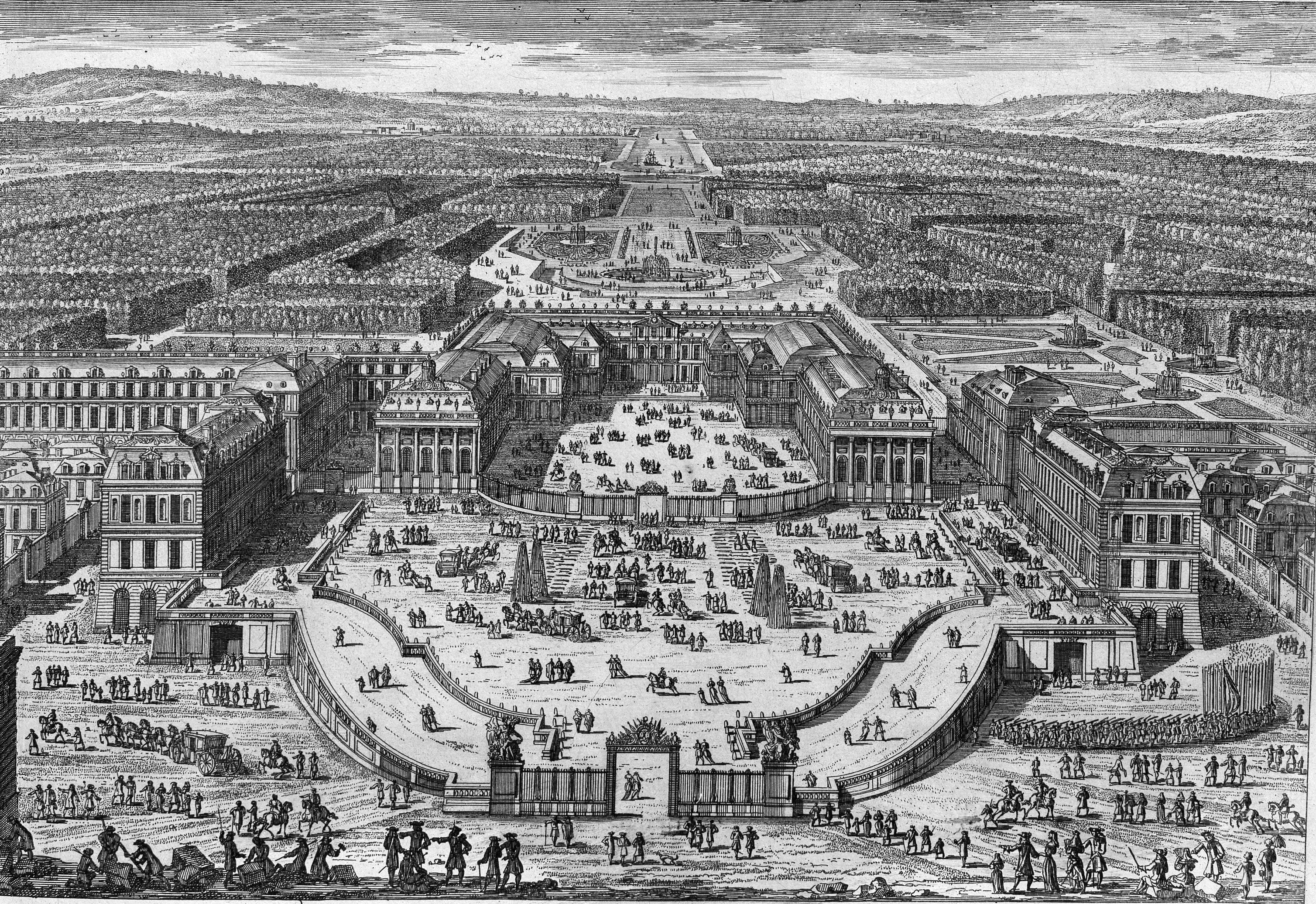
Versailles around 1682, engraving by Adam Perelle

Following the end of the Franco-Dutch War with French victory in 1678, Louis XIV appointed as First Architect Jules Hardouin-Mansart, an experienced architect in Louis XIV's confidence, who would benefit from a restored budget and large workforce of former soldiers. Mansart began his tenure with the addition from 1678 to 1681 of the Hall of Mirrors, a renovation of the courtyard façade of Louis XIII's château, and the expansion of d'Orbay's pavilions to create the Ministers' Wings in 1678–79. Adjacent to the palace, Hardouin-Mansart built a pair of stables called the Grande and Petite Écuries from 1679 to 1682 and the Grand Commun, which housed the palace's servants and general kitchens, from 1682 to 1684. Hardouin-Mansart also added two entirely new wings in Le Vau's Italianate style to house the court, first at the south end of the palace from 1679 to 1681 and then at its north end from 1685 to 1689.

War and the resulting diminished funding slowed construction at Versailles for the rest of the 17th century. The Nine Years' War, which began in 1688, stopped work altogether until 1698. Three years later, however, the even more expensive War of the Spanish Succession began and, combined with poor harvests in 1693–94 and 1709–10, plunged France into crisis. Louis XIV thus slashed funding and cancelled some of the work Hardouin-Mansart had planned in the 1680s, such as the remodelling of the courtyard façade in the Italianate style. Louis XIV and Hardouin-Mansart focused on a permanent palace chapel, the construction of which lasted from 1699 to 1710.

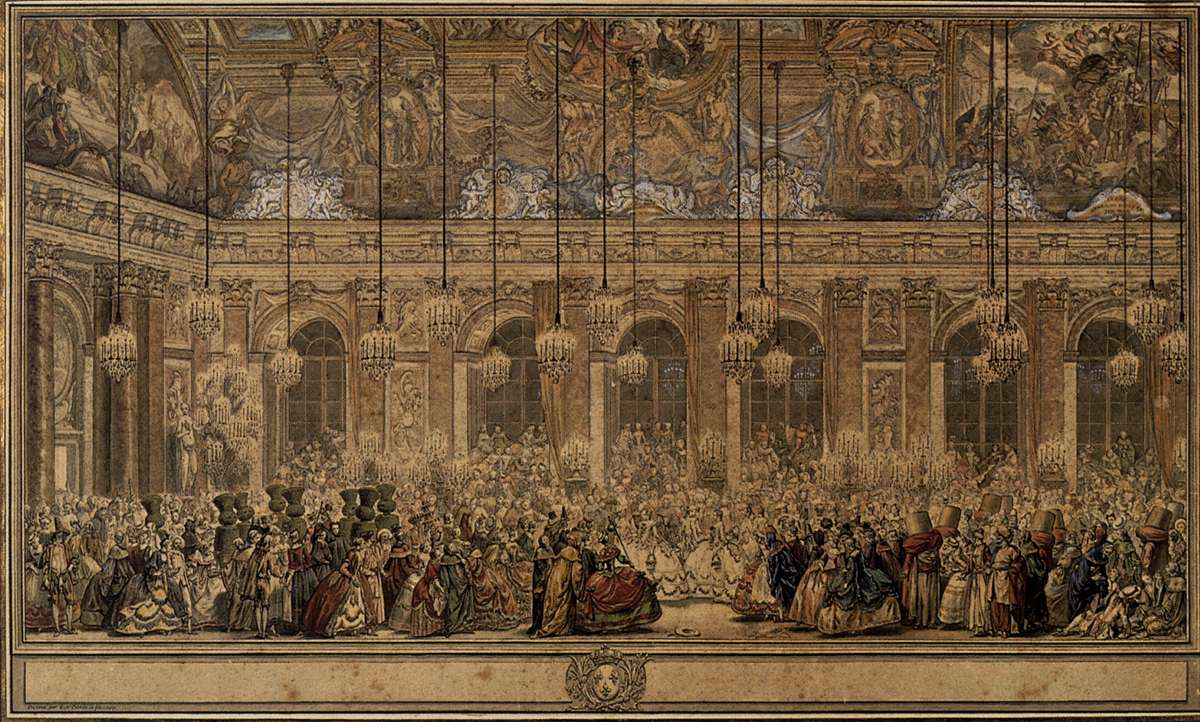
A masked ball in the Hall of Mirrors (1745) by Charles-Nicolas Cochin

Louis XIV's successors, Louis XV and Louis XVI, largely left Versailles as they inherited it and focused on the palace's interiors. Louis XV's modifications began in the 1730s, with the completion of the Salon d'Hercule, a ballroom in the north wing, and the expansion of the king's private apartment, which required the demolition of the Ambassadors' Staircase. In 1748, Louis XV began construction of a palace theatre, the Royal Opera of Versailles at the northernmost end of the palace, but completion was delayed until 1770; construction was interrupted in the 1740s by the War of the Austrian Succession and then again in 1756 with the start of the Seven Years' War. These wars emptied the royal treasury and thereafter construction was mostly funded by Madame du Barry, Louis XV's favourite mistress. In 1771, Louis XV had the northern Ministers' Wing rebuilt in Neoclassical style by Ange-Jacques Gabriel, his court architect, as it was in the process of falling down. That work was also stopped by financial constraints, and it remained incomplete when Louis XV died in 1774. In 1784, Louis XVI briefly moved the royal family to the Château de Saint-Cloud ahead of more renovations to the Palace of Versailles, but construction could not begin because of financial difficulty and political crisis. In 1789, the French Revolution swept the royal family and government out of Versailles forever.

=== Role in politics and culture ===
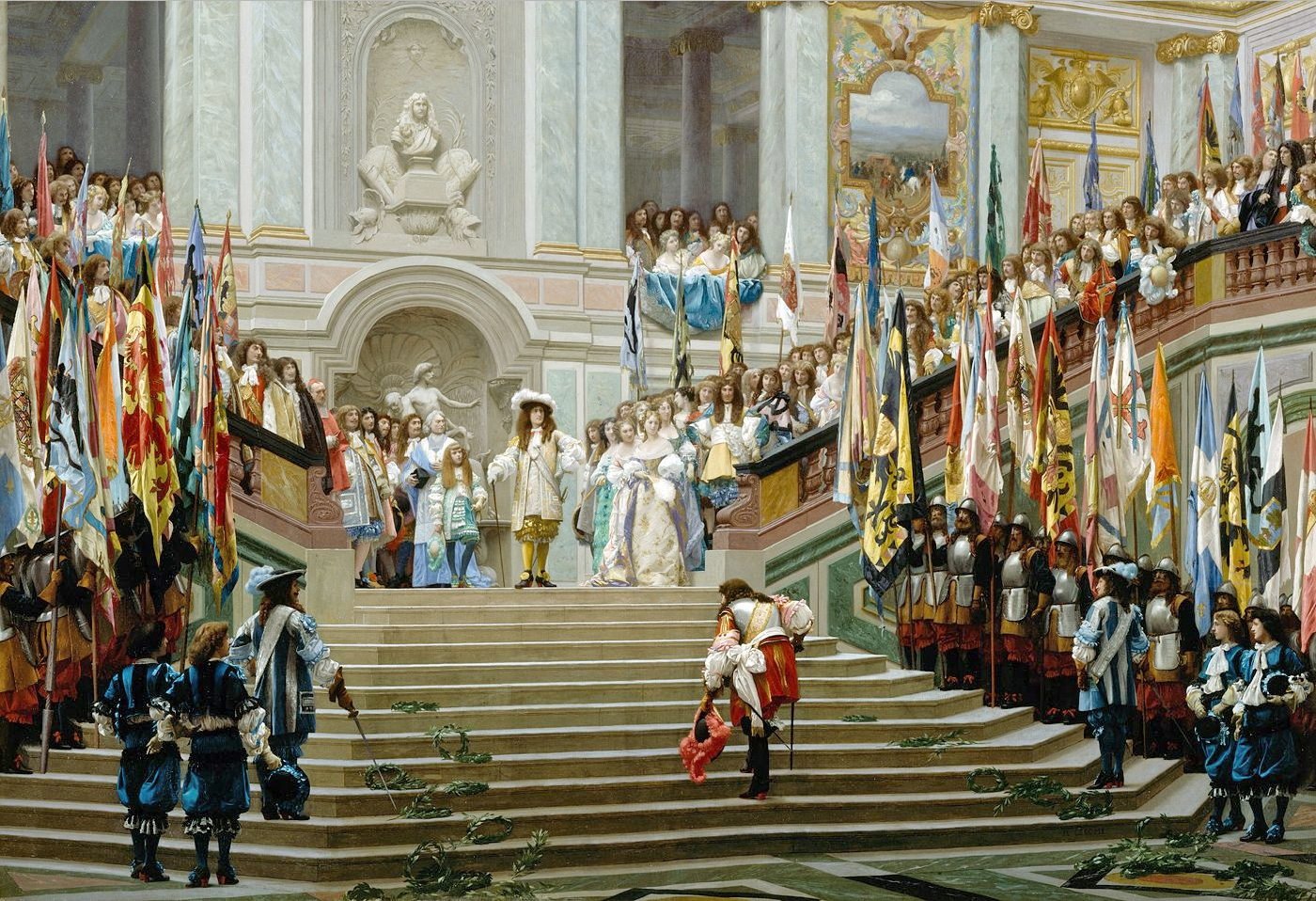
Reception of the Grand Condé at Versailles, painted by Jean-Léon Gérôme

The Palace of Versailles was key to Louis XIV's politics, as an expression and concentration of French art and culture, and for the centralization of royal power. Louis XIV first used Versailles to promote himself with a series of nighttime festivals in its gardens in 1664, 1668, and 1674, the events of which were disseminated throughout Europe by print and engravings. As early as 1669, but especially from 1678, Louis XIV sought to make Versailles his seat of government, and he expanded the palace so as to fit the court within it. The moving of the court to Versailles did not come until 1682, however, and not officially, as opinion on Versailles was mixed among the nobility of France.

By 1687, however, it was evident to all that Versailles was the de facto capital of France, and Louis XIV succeeded in attracting the nobility to Versailles to pursue prestige and royal patronage within a strict court etiquette, (Note: At any given moment during Louis XIV's reign, about 5% of France's nobles were at court in Versailles. Bohanan places the exact number of persons normally present at Versailles as 5,000 nobles and an equal number of commoners, while Blanning gives 1,000 nobles and 4,000 servants.) thus eroding their traditional provincial power bases. It was at the Palace of Versailles that Louis XIV received the Doge of Genoa, Francesco Maria Imperiale Lercari in 1685, an embassy from the Ayutthaya Kingdom in 1686, and an embassy from Safavid Iran in 1715.

Louis XIV died at Versailles on 1 September 1715 and was succeeded by his five-year-old great-grandson, Louis XV, then the duke of Anjou, who was moved to the Château de Vincennes and then to Paris by Louis XV's regent, Philippe II, Duke of Orléans. Versailles was neglected until 1722, when Philippe II removed the court to Versailles to escape the unpopularity of his regency, and when Louis XV began his majority. The 1715 move, however, broke the cultural power of Versailles, and during the reign of Louis XVI, courtiers spent their leisure in Paris, not Versailles.

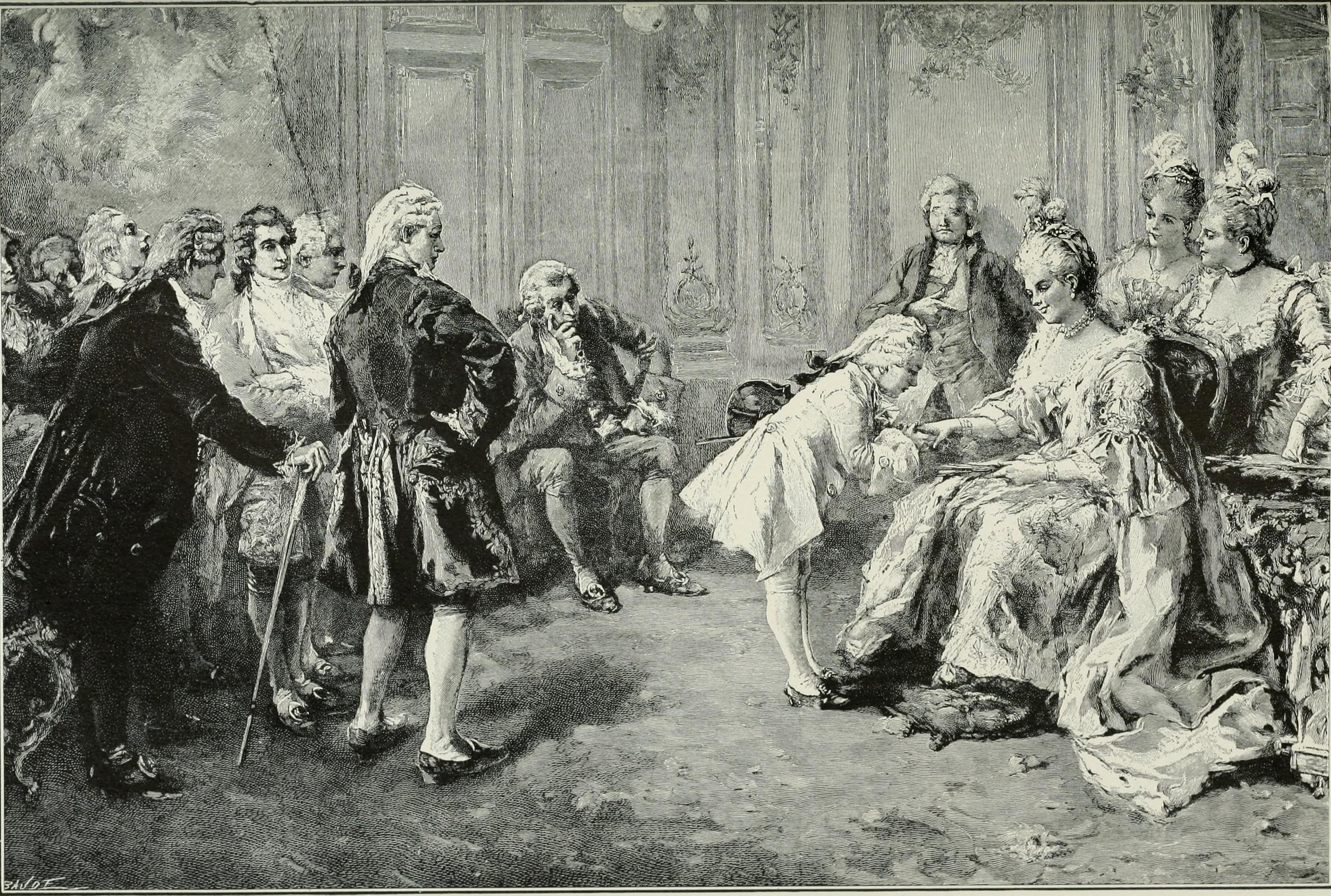
The 7-year-old Wolfgang Amadeus Mozart during his stay at the palace

During Christmas 1763, Mozart and his family visited Versailles and dined with the King. The 7-year-old Wolfgang Amadeus Mozart played several works during his stay and later dedicated his first two harpsichord sonatas, published in 1764 in Paris, to Madame Victoria, daughter of Louis XV.

In 1783, the palace was the site of the signing of the last two of the three treaties of the Peace of Paris (1783), which ended the American Revolutionary War. On 3 September, British and American delegates, led by Benjamin Franklin, signed the Treaty of Paris at the Hôtel d'York (now 56 Rue Jacob) in Paris, granting the United States independence. On 4 September, Spain and France signed separate treaties with Britain at the Palace of Versailles, formally ending the war.

The King and Queen learned of the Storming of the Bastille in Paris on 14 July 1789, while they were at the palace, and remained isolated there as the Revolution in Paris spread. The growing anger in Paris led to the Women's March on Versailles on 5 October 1789. A crowd of several thousand men and women, protesting the high price and scarcity of bread, marched from the markets of Paris to Versailles. They took weapons from the city armoury, besieged the palace, and compelled the King and royal family and the members of the National Constituent Assembly to return with them to Paris the following day.

As soon as the royal family departed, the palace was closed. In 1792, the National Convention, the new revolutionary government, ordered the transfer of all the paintings and sculptures from the palace to the Louvre. In 1793, the Convention declared the abolition of the monarchy and ordered all of the royal property in the palace to be sold at auction. The auction took place between 25 August 1793 and 11 August 1794. The furnishings and art of the palace, including the furniture, mirrors, baths, and kitchen equipment, were sold in seventeen thousand lots. All fleurs-de-lys and royal emblems on the buildings were chambered or chiselled off. The empty buildings were turned into a storehouse for furnishings, art and libraries confiscated from the nobility. The empty grand apartments were opened for tours beginning in 1793, and a small museum of French paintings and art school was opened in some of the empty rooms.

By virtue of an order issued by the Versailles district directorate in August 1794, the Royal Gate was destroyed, the Cour Royale was cleared and the Cour de Marbre lost its precious floor.

=== 19th century – history museum and government venue ===
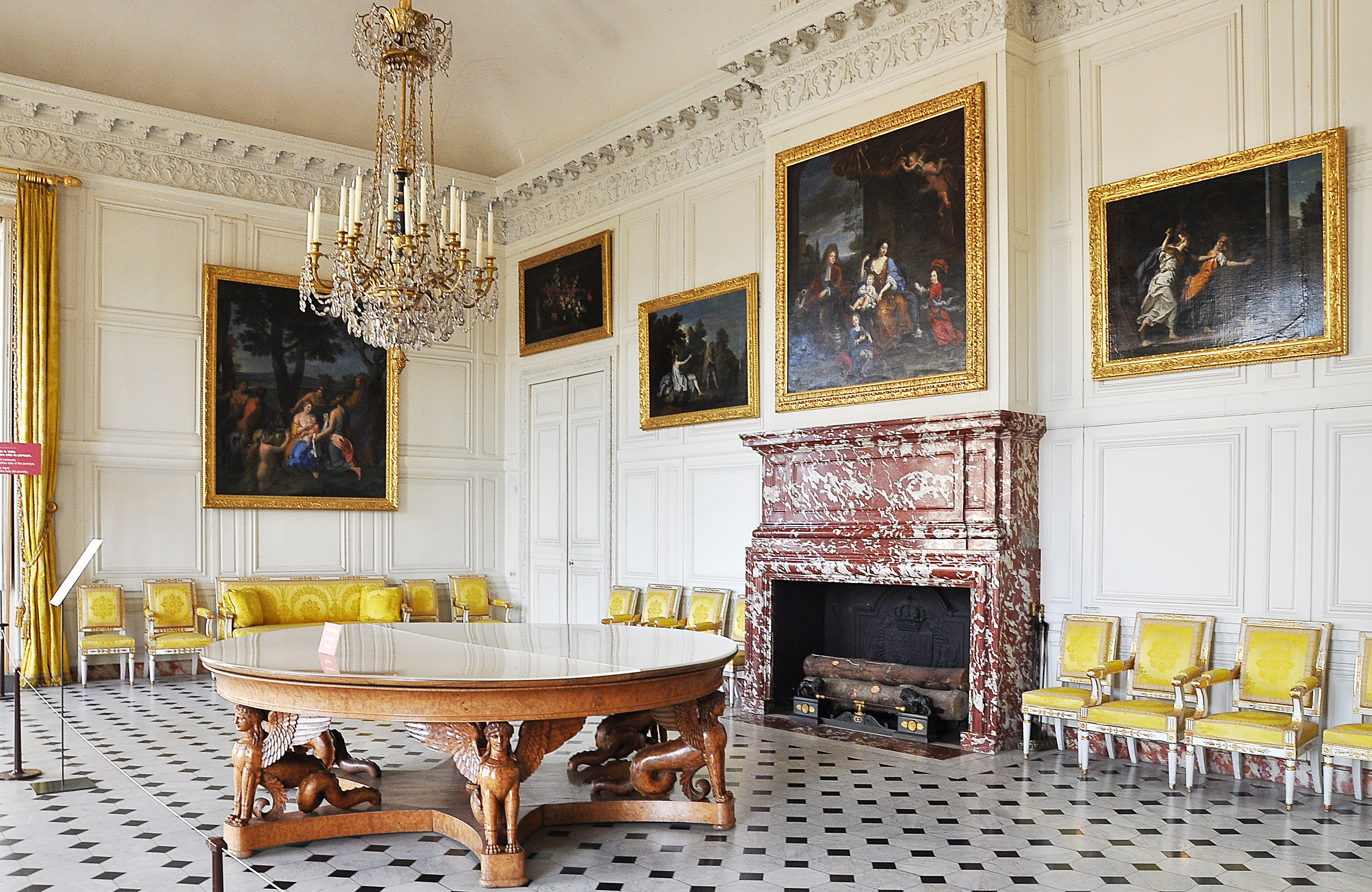
The Lords' Antechamber at Grand Trianon

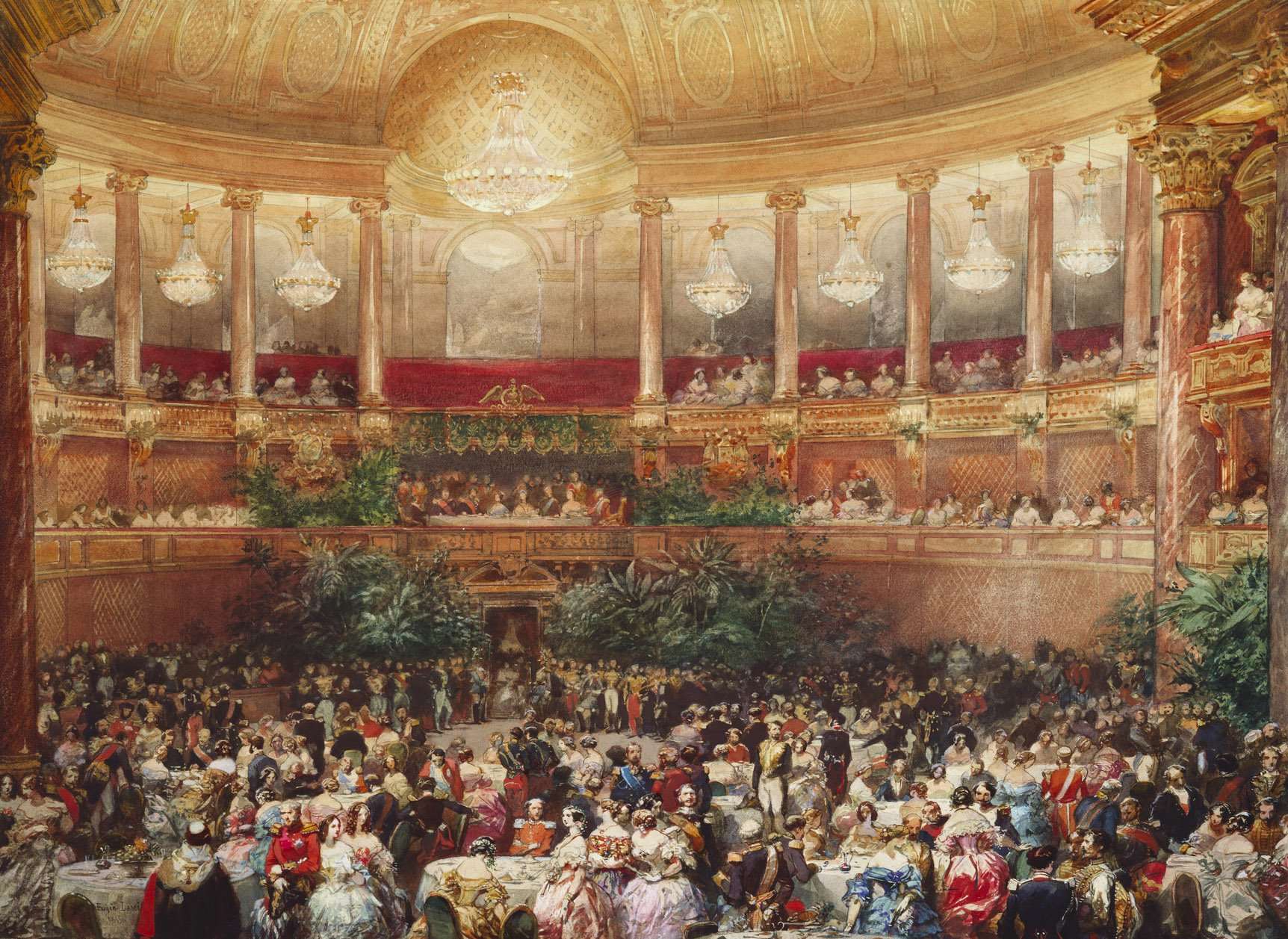
Banquet for Queen Victoria hosted by Napoleon III in the Royal Opera of Versailles, August 1855 by Eugene Lami

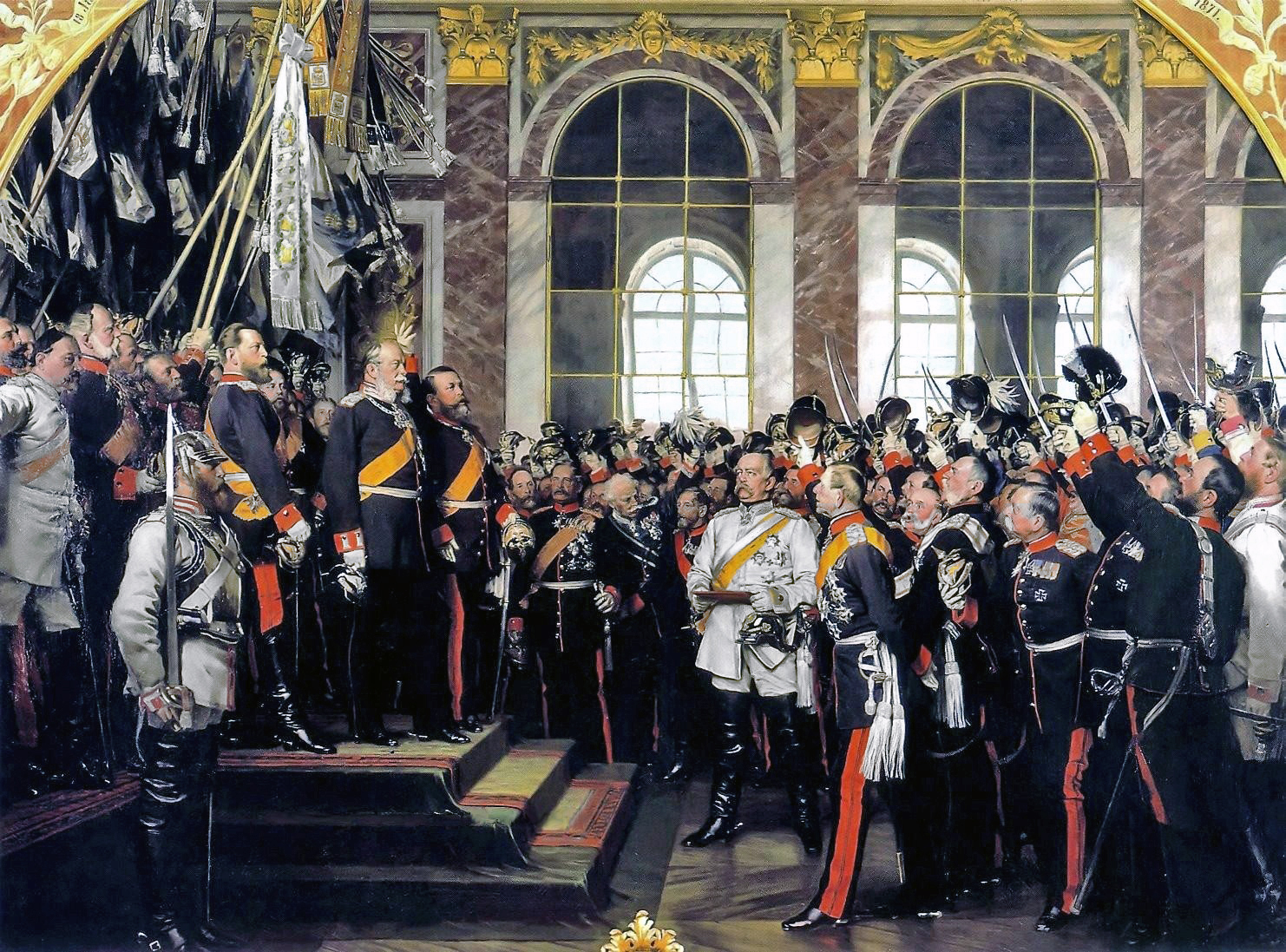
Proclamation of the German Empire, 18 January 1871, 1877 by Anton von Werner

When Napoleon became Emperor of the French in 1804, he considered making Versailles his residence but abandoned the idea because of the cost of the renovation. Prior to his marriage with Marie-Louise in 1810, he had the Grand Trianon restored and refurnished as a springtime residence for himself and his family, in the style of furnishing that it is seen today.

In 1815, with the final downfall of Napoleon, Louis XVIII, the younger brother of Louis XVI, became king, and considered returning the royal residence to Versailles, where he had been born. He ordered the restoration of the royal apartments, but the task and cost was too great. Louis XVIII had the far end of the south wing of the Cour Royale demolished and rebuilt (1814–1824) to match the Gabriel wing of 1780 opposite, which gave greater uniformity of appearance to the front entrance. Neither he nor his successor Charles X lived at Versailles.

The French Revolution of 1830 brought a new monarch, Louis Philippe I to power, and a new ambition for Versailles. He did not reside at Versailles but began the creation of the Museum of the History of France, dedicated to "all the glories of France", which had been used to house some members of the royal family. The museum was begun in 1833 and inaugurated on 30 June 1837. Its most famous room is the Galerie des Batailles (Hall of Battles), which lies on most of the length of the second floor of the south wing. The museum project largely came to a halt when Louis Philippe was overthrown in 1848, though the paintings of French heroes and great battles still remain in the south wing.

Emperor Napoleon III used the palace on occasion as a stage for grand ceremonies. One of the most lavish was the banquet that he hosted for Queen Victoria in the Royal Opera of Versailles on 25 August 1855.

During the Franco-Prussian War of 1870–1871, the palace was occupied by the general staff of the victorious German Army. Parts of the château, including the Hall of Mirrors, were turned into a military hospital. The creation of the German Empire, combining Prussia and the surrounding German states under Wilhelm I, was formally proclaimed in the Hall of Mirrors on 18 January 1871. The Germans remained in the palace until the signing of the armistice in March 1871. In that month, the government of the new French Third Republic, which had departed Paris during the war for Tours and then Bordeaux, moved into the palace. The National Assembly held its meetings in the Opera House.

The uprising of the Paris Commune in March 1871, prevented the French government, under Adolphe Thiers, from returning immediately to Paris. The military operation which suppressed the Commune at the end of May was directed from Versailles, and the prisoners of the Commune were marched there and put on trial in military courts. In 1875 a second parliamentary body, the French Senate, was created and held its meetings for the election of a President of the Republic in a new hall created in 1876 in the south wing of the palace. The French Senate and National Assembly continue to meet in the palace in joint session on special occasions, such as the amendment of the Constitution of France.

=== 20th century ===
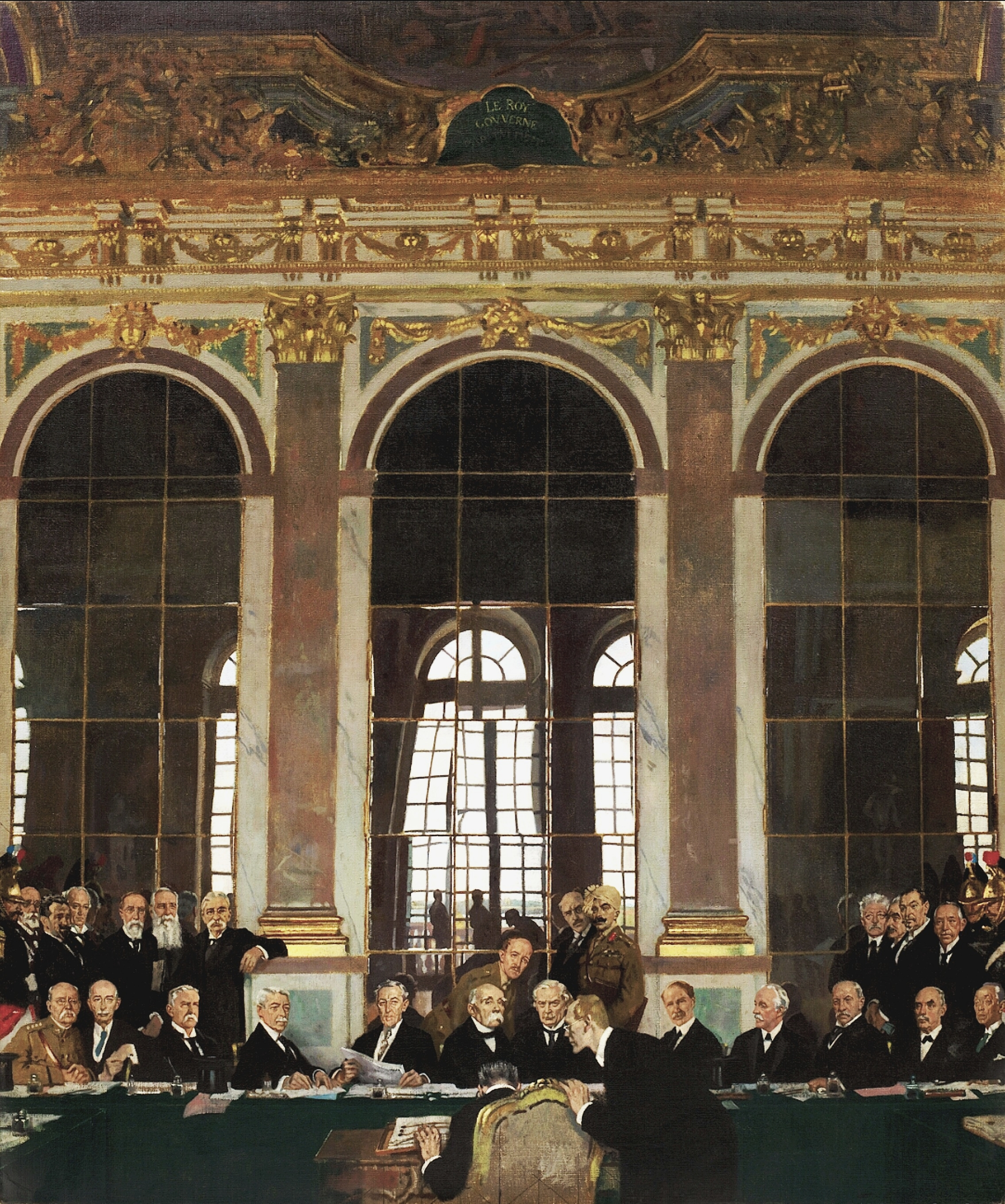
The Signing of Peace in the Hall of Mirrors, Versailles, 28 June 1919 by William Orpen

The end of the 19th and the early 20th century saw the beginning of restoration efforts at the palace, first led by Pierre de Nolhac, poet and scholar and the first conservator, who began his work in 1892. The conservation and restoration were interrupted by two world wars but have continued until the present day.

The palace returned to the world stage in June 1919, when, after six months of negotiations, the Treaty of Versailles, formally ending the First World War, was signed in the Hall of Mirrors. Between 1925 and 1928, the American philanthropist and multi-millionaire John D. Rockefeller, Jr. gave $2,166,000, the equivalent of about 38 million dollars in 2024, to restore and refurbish the palace.

More work took place after World War II, with the restoration of the Royal Opera of Versailles. The theatre was reopened in 1957, in the presence of Queen Elizabeth II of the United Kingdom.

In 1978, parts of the palace were heavily damaged in a bombing committed by Breton terrorists.

Starting in the 1950s, when the museum of Versailles was under the directorship of Gérald van der Kemp, the objective was to restore the palace to its state – or as close to it as possible – in 1789 when the royal family left the palace. Among the early projects was the repair of the roof over the Hall of Mirrors; the publicity campaign brought international attention to the plight of post-war Versailles and garnered much foreign money including a grant from the Rockefeller Foundation.

One of the more costly endeavours for the museum and the French Fifth Republic has been to repurchase as much of the original furnishings as possible. Consequently, because furniture with a royal provenance – and especially furniture that was made for Versailles – is a highly sought-after commodity on the international market, the museum has spent considerable funds on retrieving much of the palace's original furnishings.

=== 21st century ===
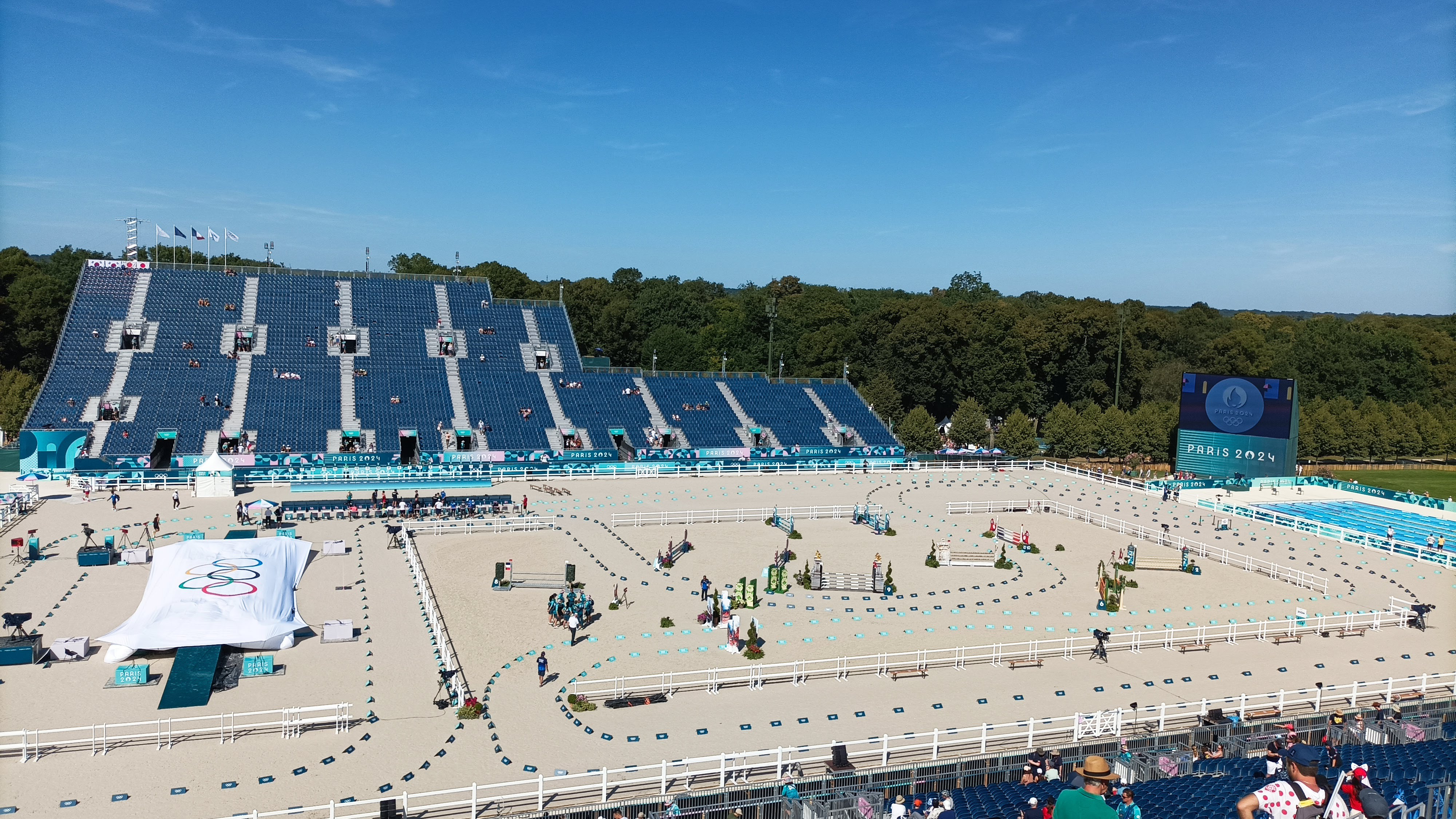
Modern Pentathlon Park for the 2024 Summer Olympics

The Palace of Versailles is currently owned by the French state. Its formal title is the Public Establishment of the Palace, Museum and National Estate of Versailles. Since 1995, it has been run as a Public Establishment, with an independent administration and management supervised by the French Ministry of Culture.

Several restoration activities were initiated during the 2000s. In 2003, a new restoration initiative – the "Grand Versailles" project – was started, which began with the replanting of the gardens, which had lost over 10,000 trees during Cyclone Lothar on 26 December 1999. One part of the initiative, the restoration of the Hall of Mirrors, was completed in 2006. Another major project, the further restoration of the backstage areas of the Royal Opera of Versailles, occurred from 2007 to 2009.

The palace and its grounds continue to be the site of several events in the 2020s. During the 2024 Summer Olympics, the palace's grounds hosted the equestrian and modern pentathlon competitions. In 2026, American singer-songwriter Olivia Rodrigo filmed the music video of her single "Drop Dead" in and around the palace, which is referenced in the song's lyrics. Months later, on 17 June 2026, U.S. President Donald Trump signed the Islamabad Memorandum – the memorandum of understanding to end the 2026 Iran war – during his dinner at the palace with French President Emmanuel Macron, which was held after the G7 summit in Évian-les-Bains. His Iranian counterpart, President Masoud Pezeshkian also remotely signed the document in Tehran.

== Architecture and plan ==
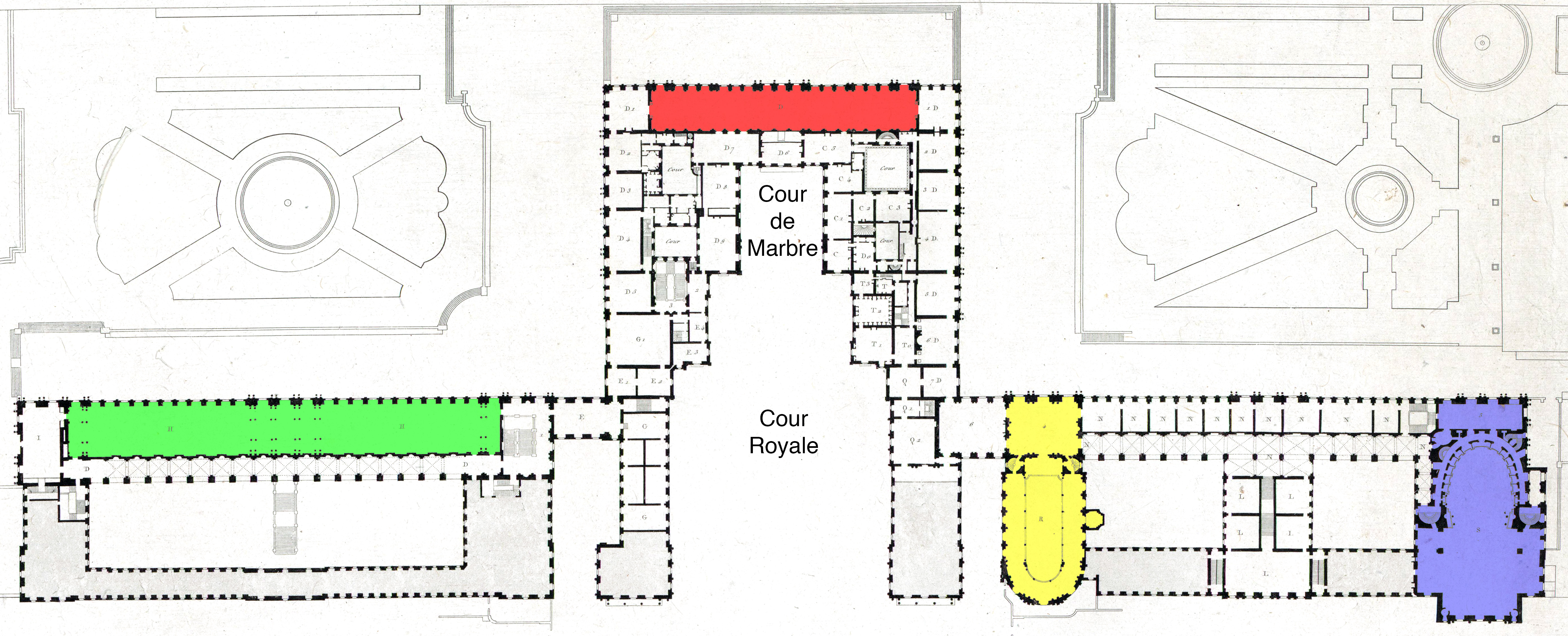
Plan of the main floor (c. 1837, with north to the right), showing the Hall of Mirrors in red, the Hall of Battles in green, the Royal Chapel in yellow, and the Royal Opera in blue

The Royal Court (Cour Royale)

The Palace of Versailles is a visual history of French architecture from the 1630s to the 1780s. Its earliest portion, the corps de logis, was built for Louis XIII in the style of his reign with brick, marble, and slate, which Le Vau surrounded in the 1660s with Enveloppe, an edifice that was inspired by Renaissance-era Italian villas. When Jules Hardouin-Mansart made further expansions to the palace in the 1680s, he used the Enveloppe as the model for his work. Neoclassical additions were made to the palace with the remodelling of the Ministers' Wings in the 1770s, by Ange-Jacques Gabriel, and after the Bourbon Restoration.

The palace was largely completed by the death of Louis XIV in 1715. The eastern facing palace has a U-shaped layout, with the corps de logis and symmetrical advancing secondary wings terminating with the Dufour Pavilion on the south and the Gabriel Pavilion to the north, creating an expansive cour d'honneur known as the Royal Court (Cour Royale). Flanking the Royal Court are two enormous asymmetrical wings that result in a façade of 402 metres (1,319 ft) in length. Covered by around 10 hectares (1.1 million square feet) of roof, the palace has 2,143 windows, 1,252 chimneys, and 67 staircases.

The palace and its grounds have had a great influence on architecture and horticulture from the mid-17th century to the end of the 18th century. Examples of works influenced by Versailles include Christopher Wren's work at Hampton Court Palace, Berlin Palace, the Palace of La Granja, Stockholm Palace, Ludwigsburg Palace, Karlsruhe Palace, Rastatt Palace, Nymphenburg Palace, Schleissheim Palace, and Esterházy Palace.

== Royal Apartments ==
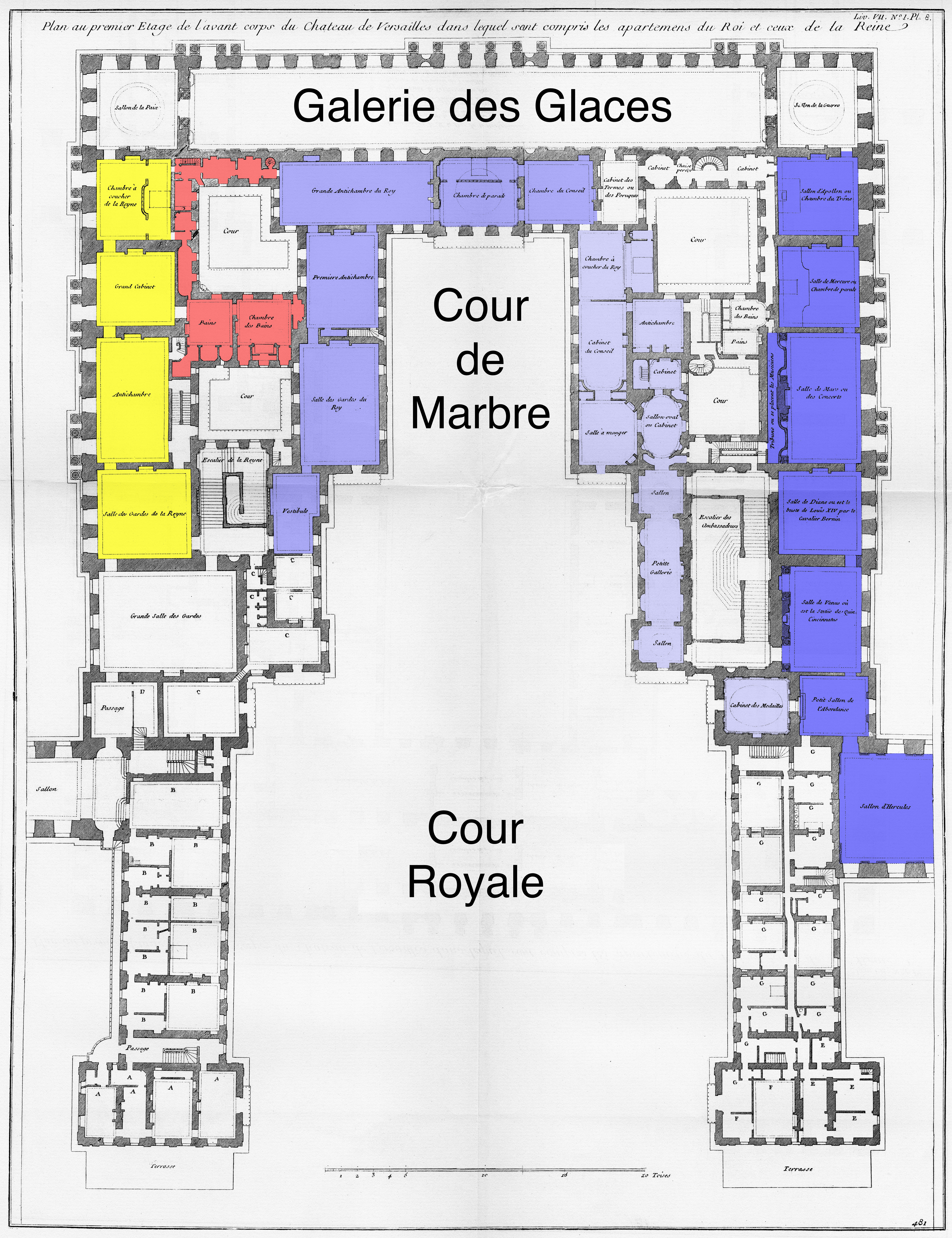
Plan of the main floor in the central part of the palace (c. 1742), showing the grand appartement du roi in dark blue, the appartement du roi in medium blue, the petit appartement du roi in light blue, the grand appartement de la reine in yellow, and the petit appartement de la reine in red

The construction in 1668–1671 of Louis Le Vau's enveloppe around the outside of Louis XIII's red brick and white stone château added state apartments for the king and the queen. The addition was known at the time as the château neuf (new château). The grands appartements (Grand Apartments, also referred to as the State Apartments) include the grand appartement du roi and the grand appartement de la reine. They occupied the main or principal floor of the château neuf, with three rooms in each apartment facing the garden to the west and four facing the garden parterres to the north and south, respectively. The private apartments of the king (the appartement du roi and the petit appartement du roi) and those of the queen (the petit appartement de la reine) remained in the château vieux (old château). Le Vau's design for the state apartments closely followed Italian models of the day, including the placement of the apartments on the main floor (the piano nobile, the next floor up from the ground level), a convention the architect borrowed from Italian palace design.

The king's State Apartment consisted of an enfilade of seven rooms, each dedicated to one of the known planets and their associated titular Roman deity. The queen's apartment formed a parallel enfilade with that of the grand appartement du roi. After the addition of the Hall of Mirrors (1678–1684) the king's apartment was reduced to five rooms (until the reign of Louis XV, when two more rooms were added) and the queen's to four.

The queen's apartments served as the residence of three queens of France – Maria Theresa of Spain, wife of Louis XIV, Maria Leszczyńska, wife of Louis XV, and Marie Antoinette, wife of Louis XVI. Additionally, Louis XIV's granddaughter-in-law, Princess Marie-Adélaïde of Savoy, duchess of Burgundy, wife of Louis, Duke of Burgundy, occupied these rooms from 1697 (the year of her marriage) to her death in 1712. (Note: Six kings were born in this room: Philip V of Spain, Louis XV, Louis XVI, Louis XVII, Louis XVIII, and Charles X.)

=== Ambassador's Staircase ===
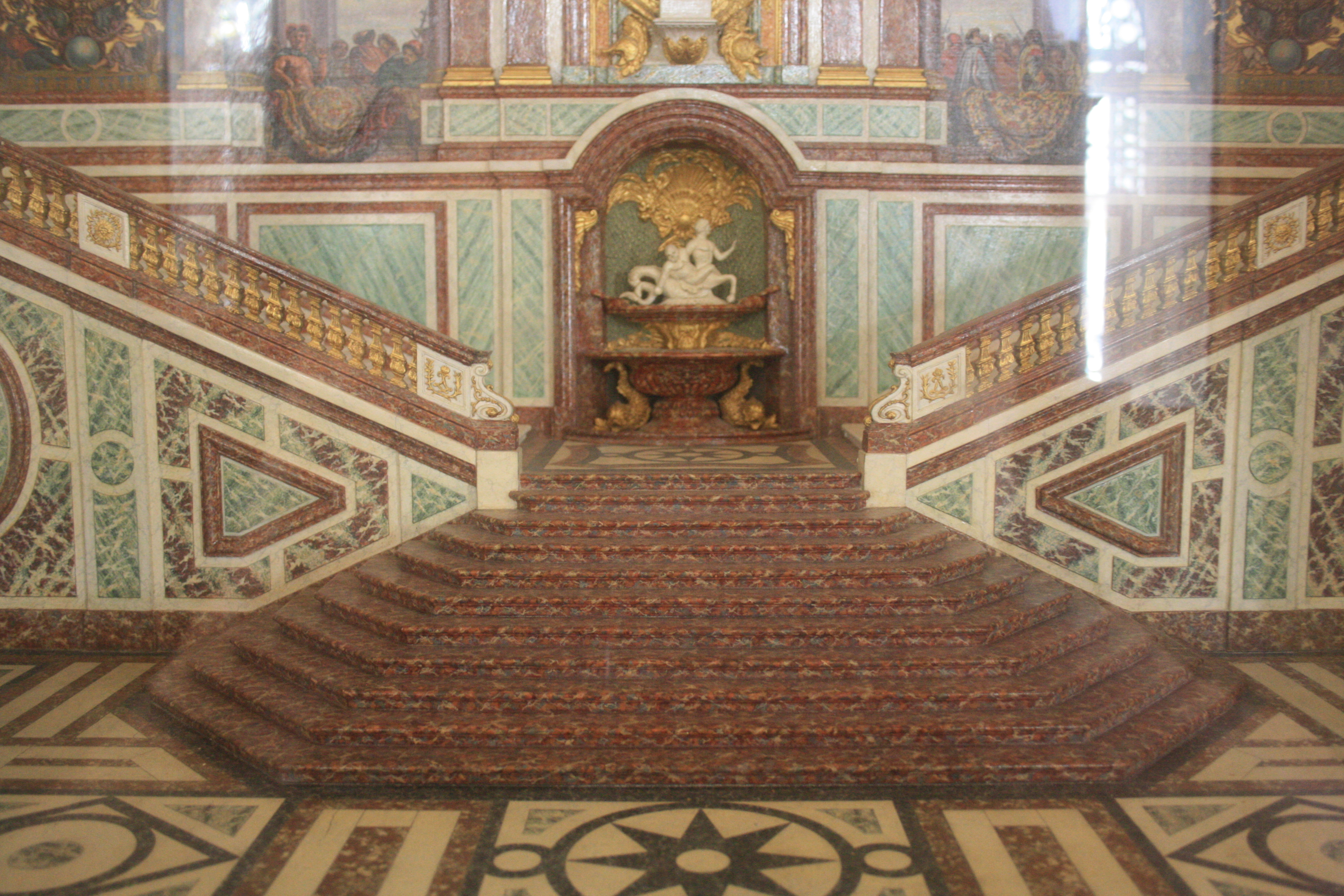
Model of the former Ambassador's Staircase

The Ambassadors' Staircase (Escalier des Ambassadeurs) was an imperial staircase built from 1674 to 1680 by François d'Orbay. Until Louis XV had it demolished in 1752 to create a courtyard for his private apartments, the staircase was the primary entrance into the Palace of Versailles and the royal apartments especially. It was entered from the courtyard via a vestibule that, cramped and dark, contrasted greatly with the tall, open space of the staircase – famously lit naturally with a skylight – so as to overawe visitors.

The staircase and walls of the room that contained it were clad in polychrome marble and gilded bronze, with decor in the Ionic order. Charles Le Brun painted the walls and ceiling of the room according to a festive theme to celebrate Louis XIV's victory in the Franco-Dutch War. On the wall immediately above the staircase were trompe-l'œil paintings of people from the Four Parts of the World looking into the staircase over a balustrade, a motif repeated on the ceiling fresco. There they were joined by allegorical figures for the twelve months of the year and various Classical Greek figures such as the Muses. A marble bust of Louis XIV, sculpted by Jean Warin in 1665–66, was placed in a niche above the first landing of the staircase.

=== The State Apartments of the King ===
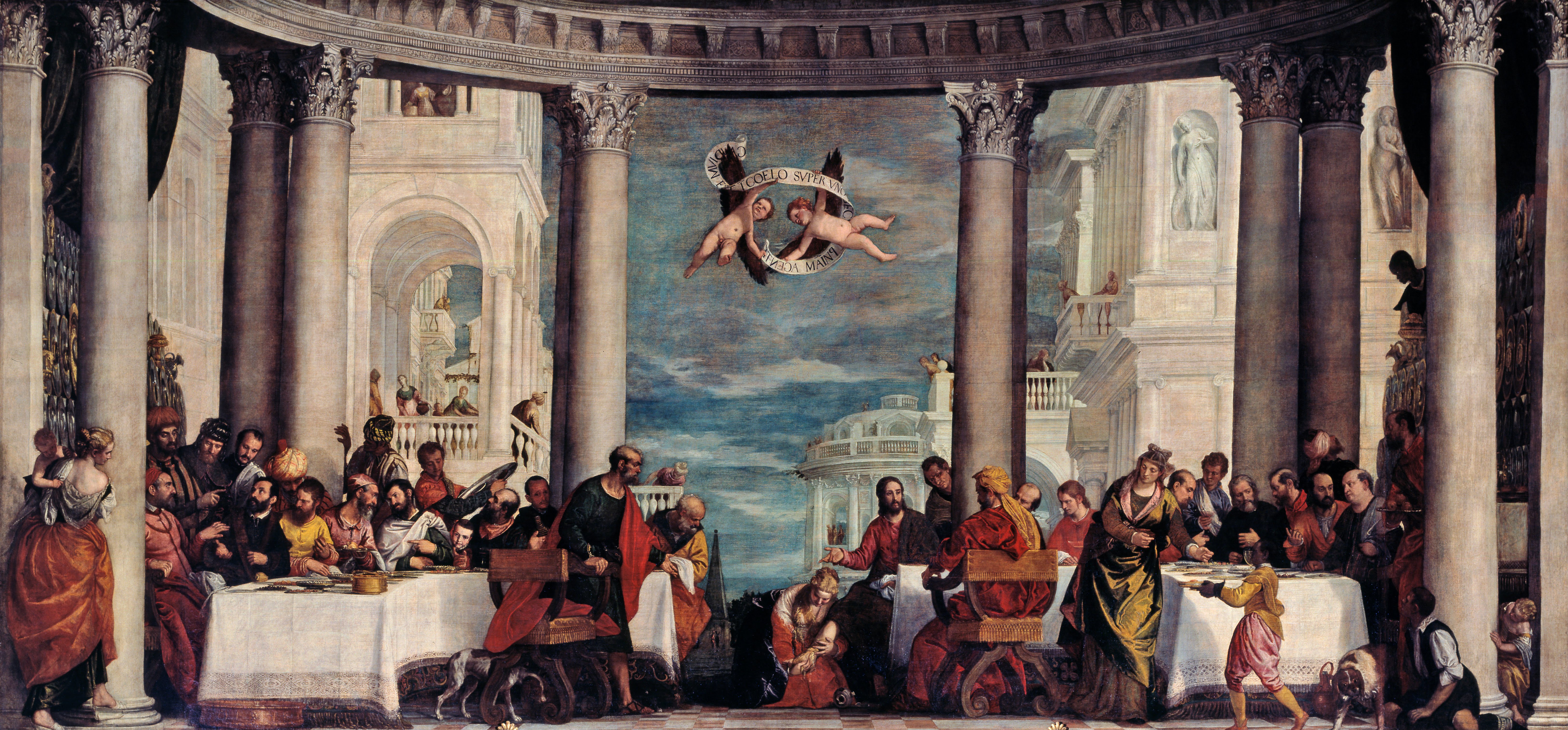
Meal at the House of Simon the Pharisee by Veronese in the Salon of Hercules

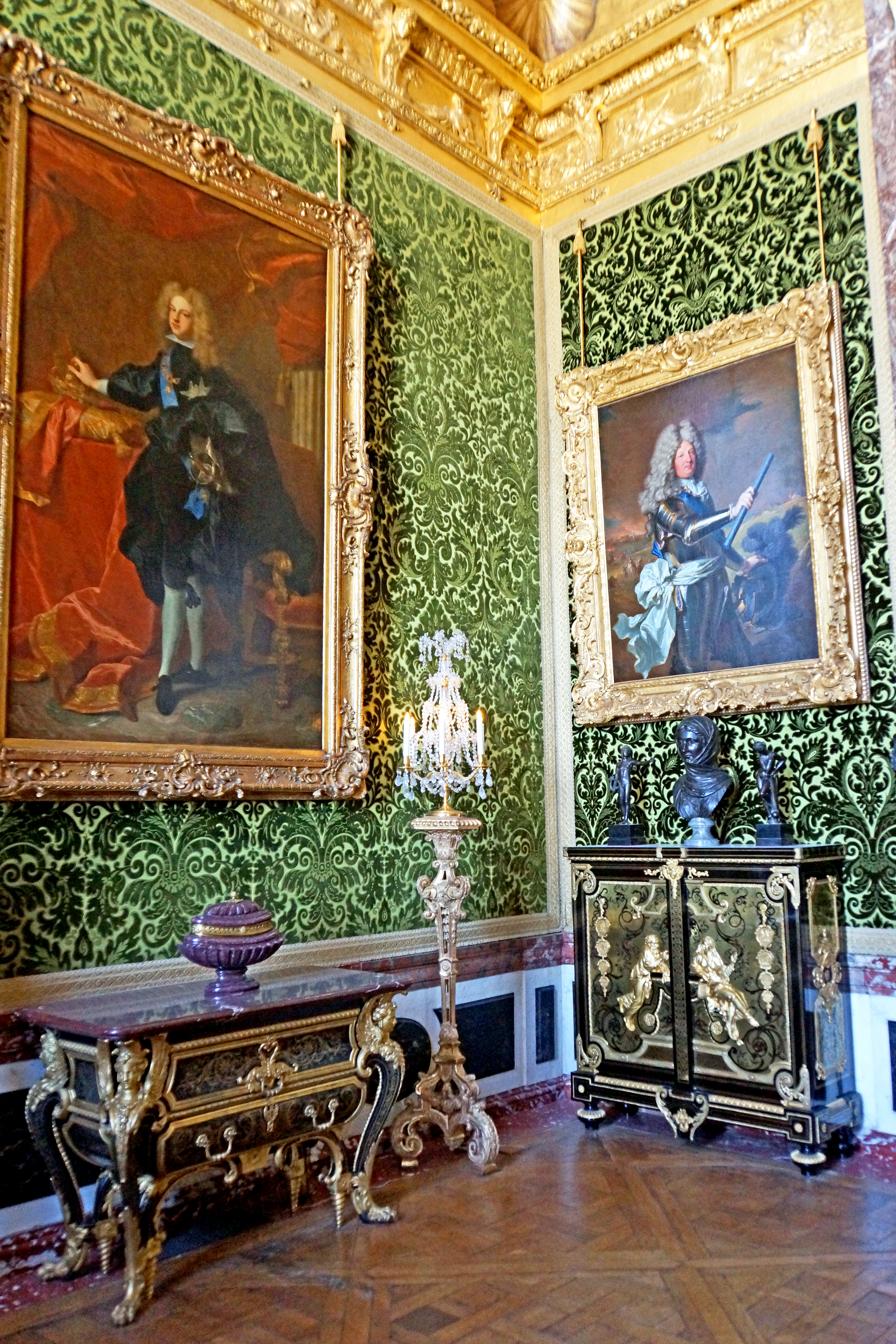
Salon of Abundance

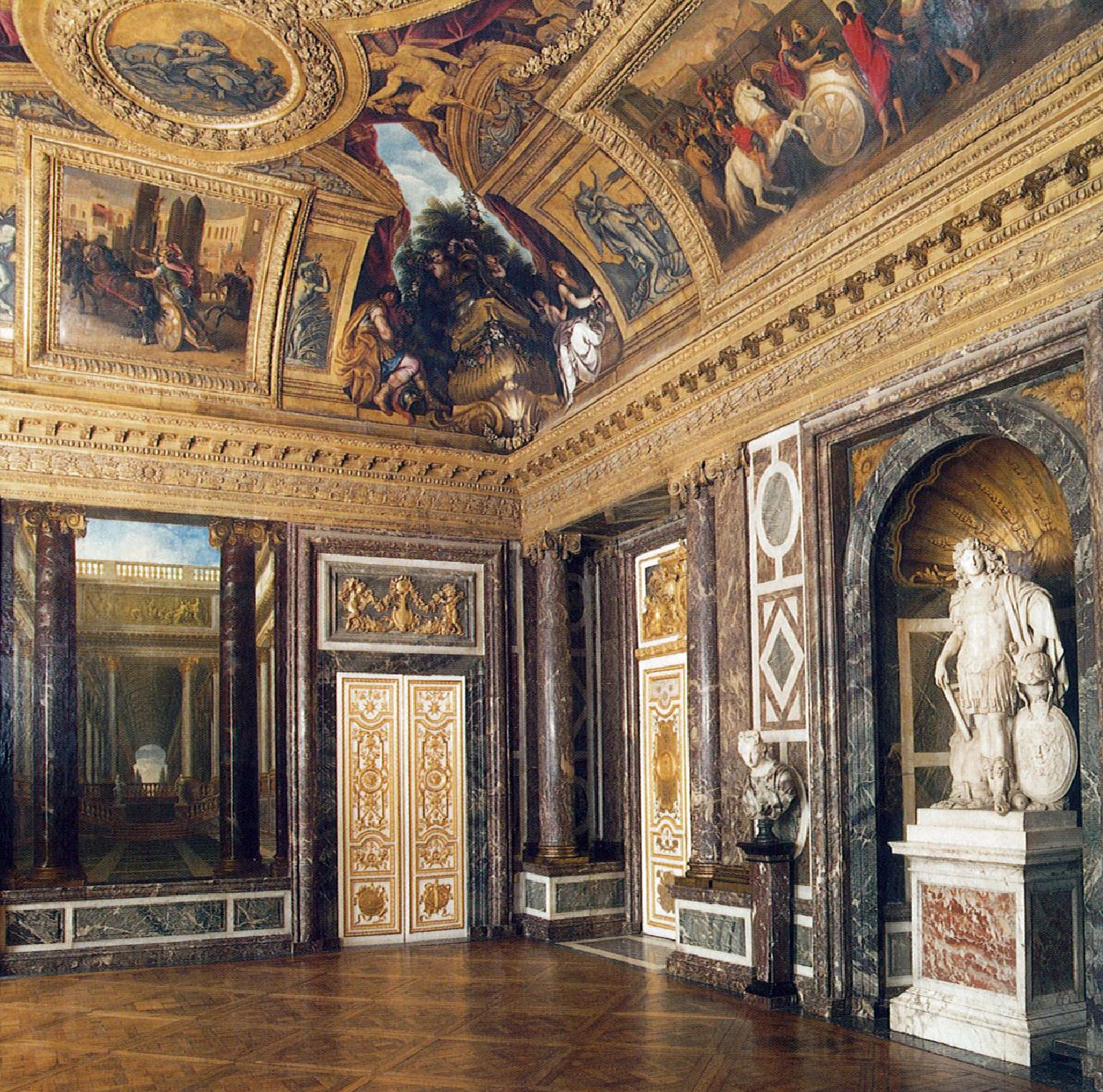
Salon of Venus

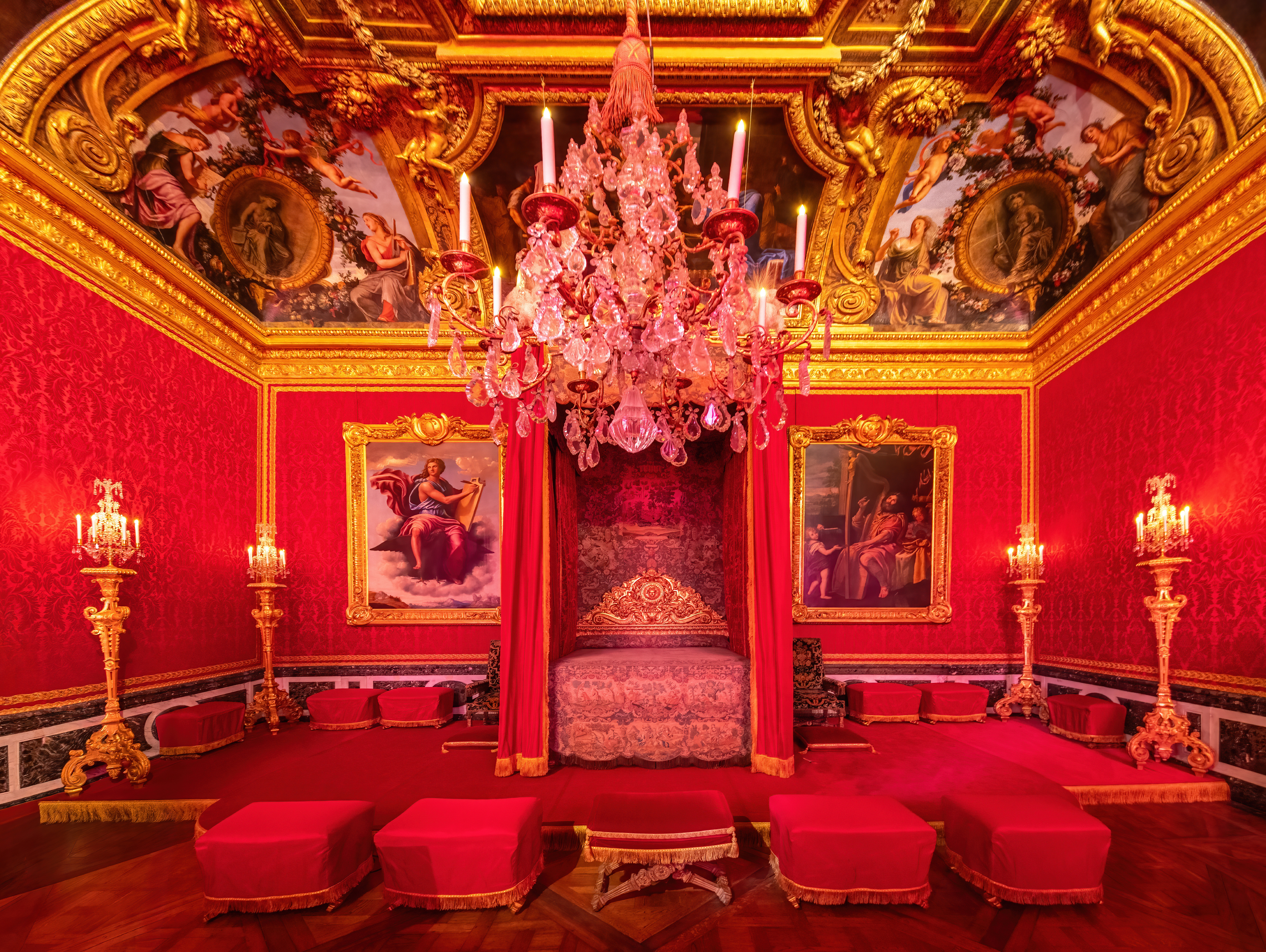
Salon of Mercury

The construction of the Hall of Mirrors between 1678 and 1686 coincided with a major alteration to the State Apartments. They were originally intended as his residence, but the King transformed them into galleries for his finest paintings, and venues for his many receptions for courtiers. During the season from All-Saints Day in November until Easter, these were usually held three times a week, from six to ten in the evening, with various entertainments.

==== The Salon of Hercules ====
This was originally a chapel. It was rebuilt beginning in 1712 under the supervision of the First Architect to the King, Robert de Cotte, to showcase two paintings by Paolo Veronese, Eleazar and Rebecca and Meal at the House of Simon the Pharisee, which was a gift to Louis XIV from the Republic of Venice in 1664. The painting on the ceiling, The Apotheosis of Hercules, by François Lemoyne, was completed in 1736, and gave the room its name.

==== The Salon of Abundance ====
The Salon of Abundance was the antechamber to the Cabinet of Curios (now the Games Room), which displayed Louis XIV's collection of precious jewels and rare objects. Some of the objects in the collection are depicted in René-Antoine Houasse's painting Abundance and Liberality (1683), located on the ceiling over the door opposite the windows.

==== The Salon of Venus ====
This salon was used for serving light meals during evening receptions. The principal feature in this room is Jean Warin's life-size statue of Louis XIV in the costume of a Roman emperor. On the ceiling in a gilded oval frame is another painting by Houasse, Venus subjugating the Gods and Powers (1672–1681). Trompe-l'œil paintings and sculpture around the ceiling illustrate mythological themes.

==== The Salon of Mercury ====
The Salon of Mercury was the original State Bedchamber when Louis XIV officially moved the court and government to the palace in 1682. The bed is a replica of the original commissioned by King Louis Philippe I in the 19th century when he turned the palace into a museum. The ceiling paintings by the Flemish artist Jean Baptiste de Champaigne depict the god Mercury in his chariot, drawn by a rooster, and Alexander the Great and Ptolemy surrounded by scholars and philosophers. The Automaton Clock was made for the King by the royal clockmaker Antoine Morand in 1706. When it chimes the hour, figures of Louis XIV and Fame descend from a cloud.

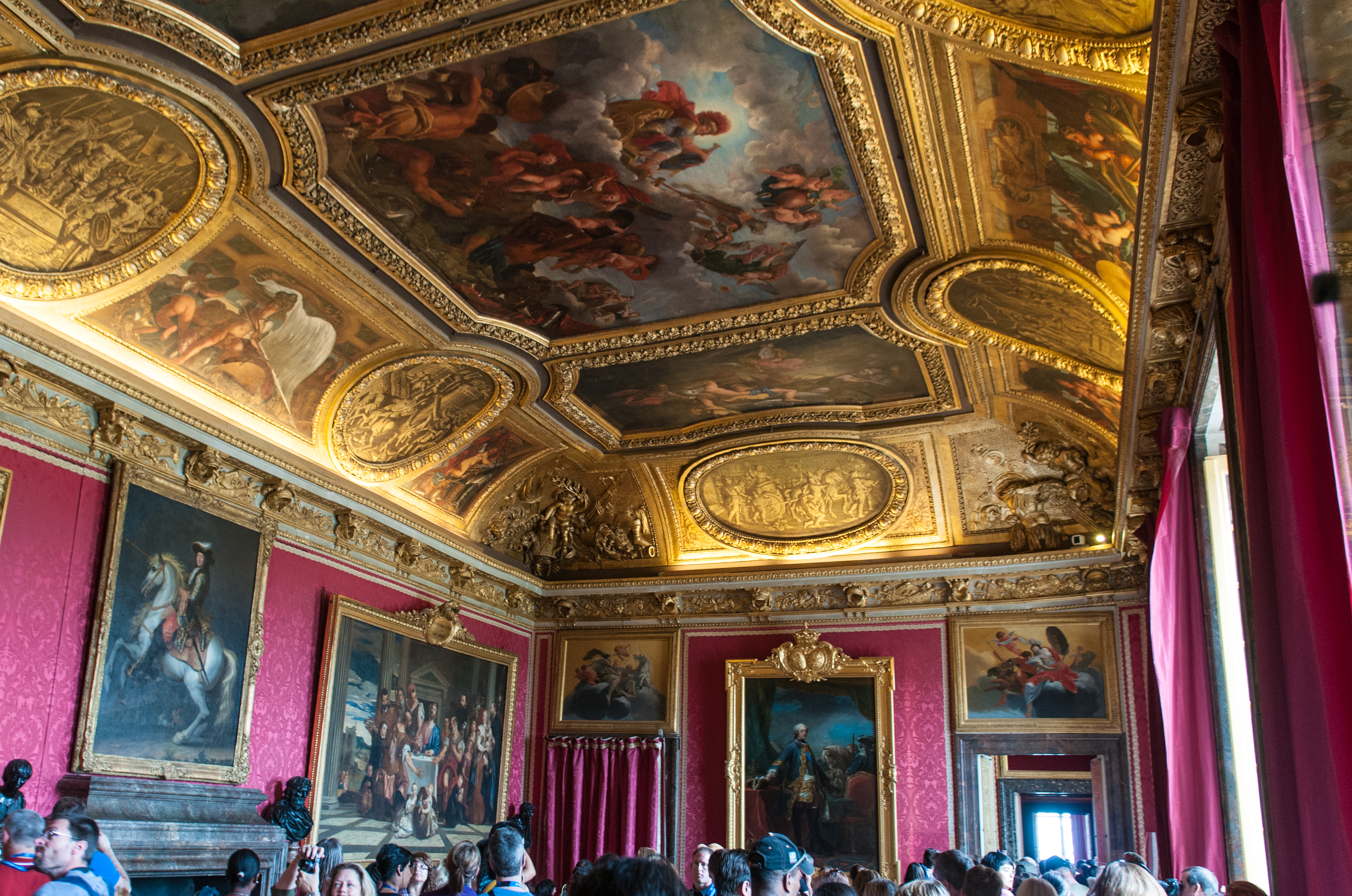
Salon of Mars

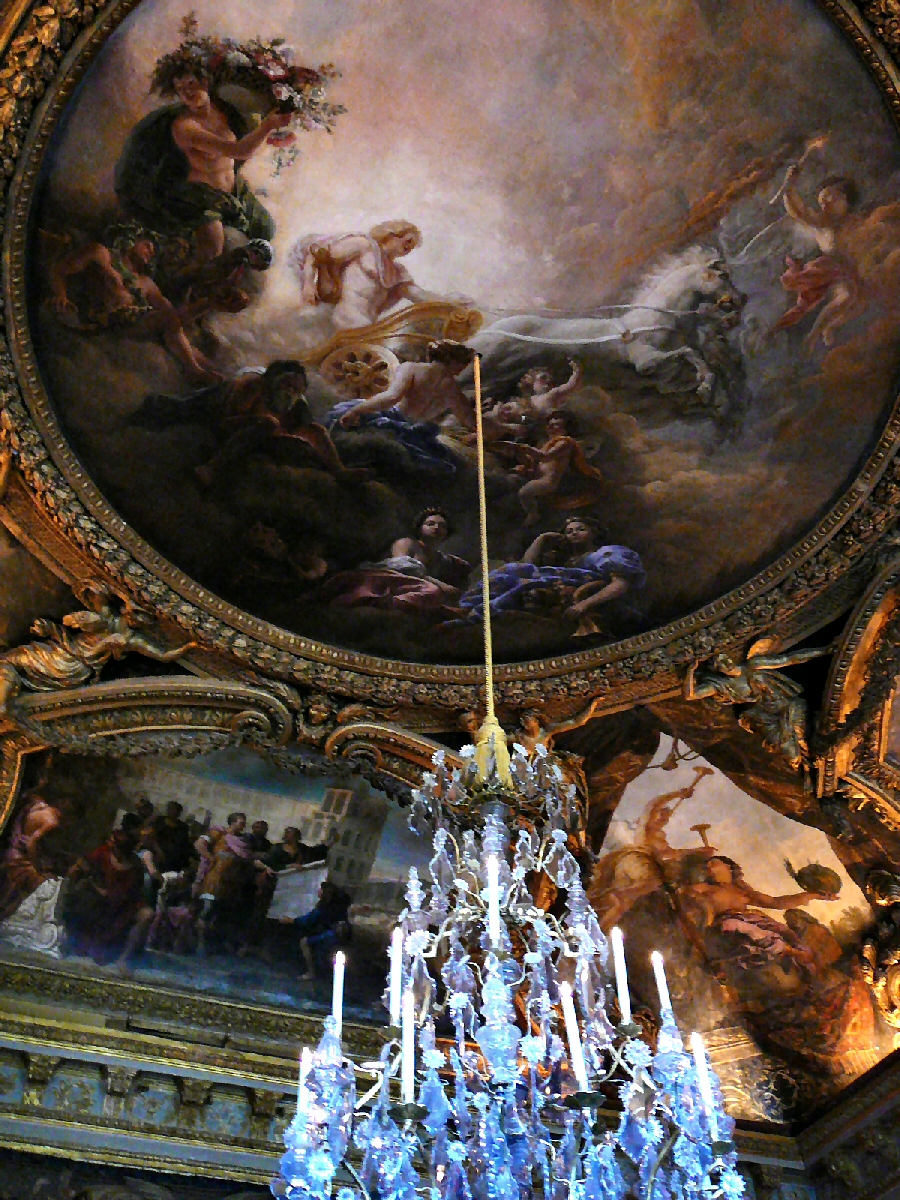
Ceiling in the Salon of Apollo, depicting the Sun Chariot of Apollo

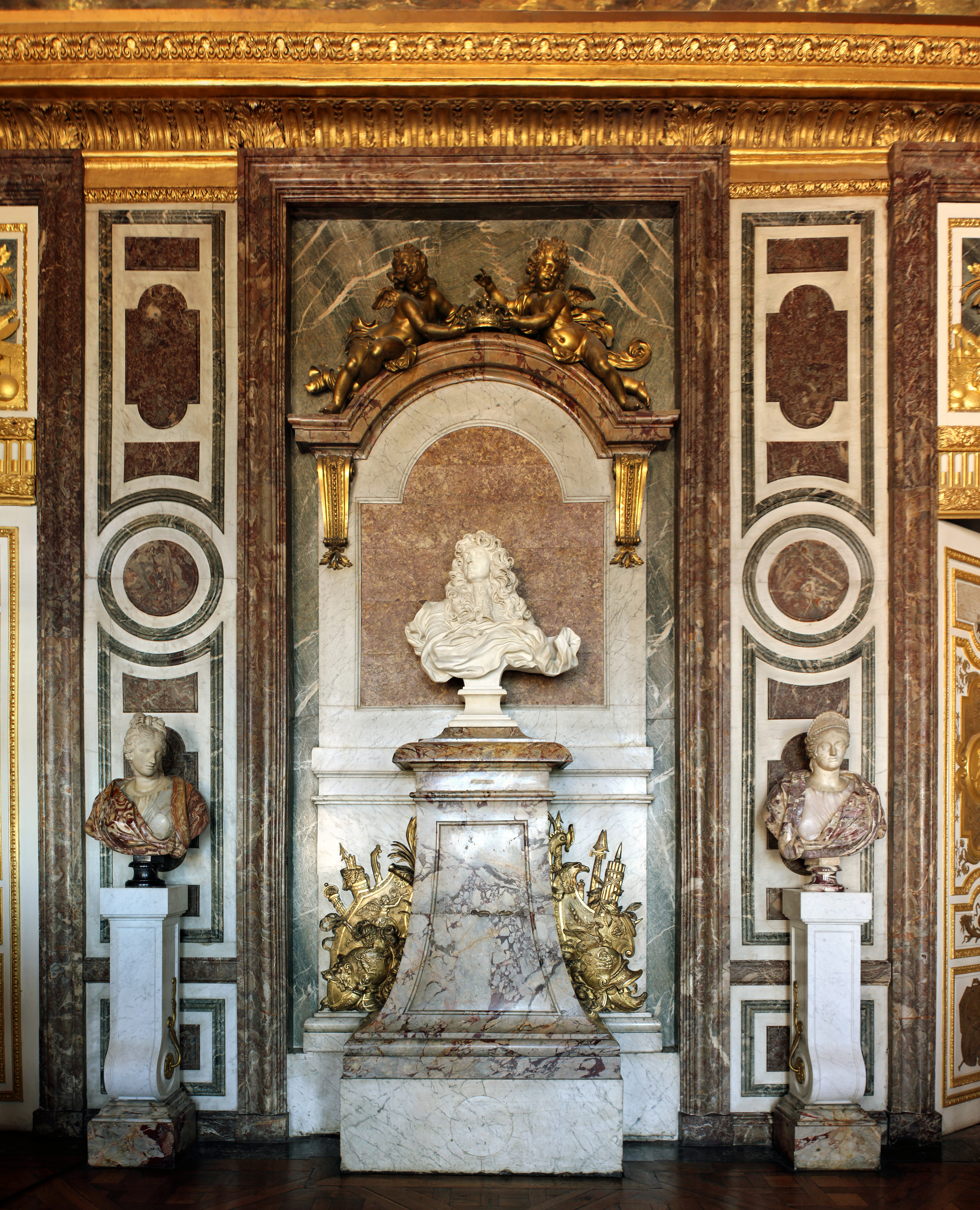
Bust of Louis XIV by Bernini in the Salon of Diana

==== The Salon of Mars ====
The Salon of Mars was used by the royal guards until 1782, and was decorated on a military theme with helmets and trophies. It was turned into a concert room between 1684 and 1750, with galleries for musicians on either side. Portraits of Louis XV and his Queen, Marie Leszczyńska, by the Flemish artist Carle Van Loo decorate the room today.

==== The Salon of Apollo ====
The Salon of Apollo was the royal throne room under Louis XIV, and was the setting for formal audiences. The eight-foot-high silver throne was melted down in 1689 to help pay the costs of an expensive war, and was replaced by a more modest throne of gilded wood. The central painting on the ceiling, by Charles de la Fosse, depicts the Sun Chariot of Apollo, the King's favourite emblem, pulled by four horses and surrounded by the four seasons.

==== The Salon of Diana ====
The Salon of Diana was used by Louis XIV as a billiards room, and had galleries from which courtiers could watch him play. The decoration of the walls and ceiling depicts scenes from the life of the goddess Diana. The celebrated bust of Louis XIV by Bernini made during the famous sculptor's visit to France in 1665 is on display here.

=== Private apartments of the King and Queen ===
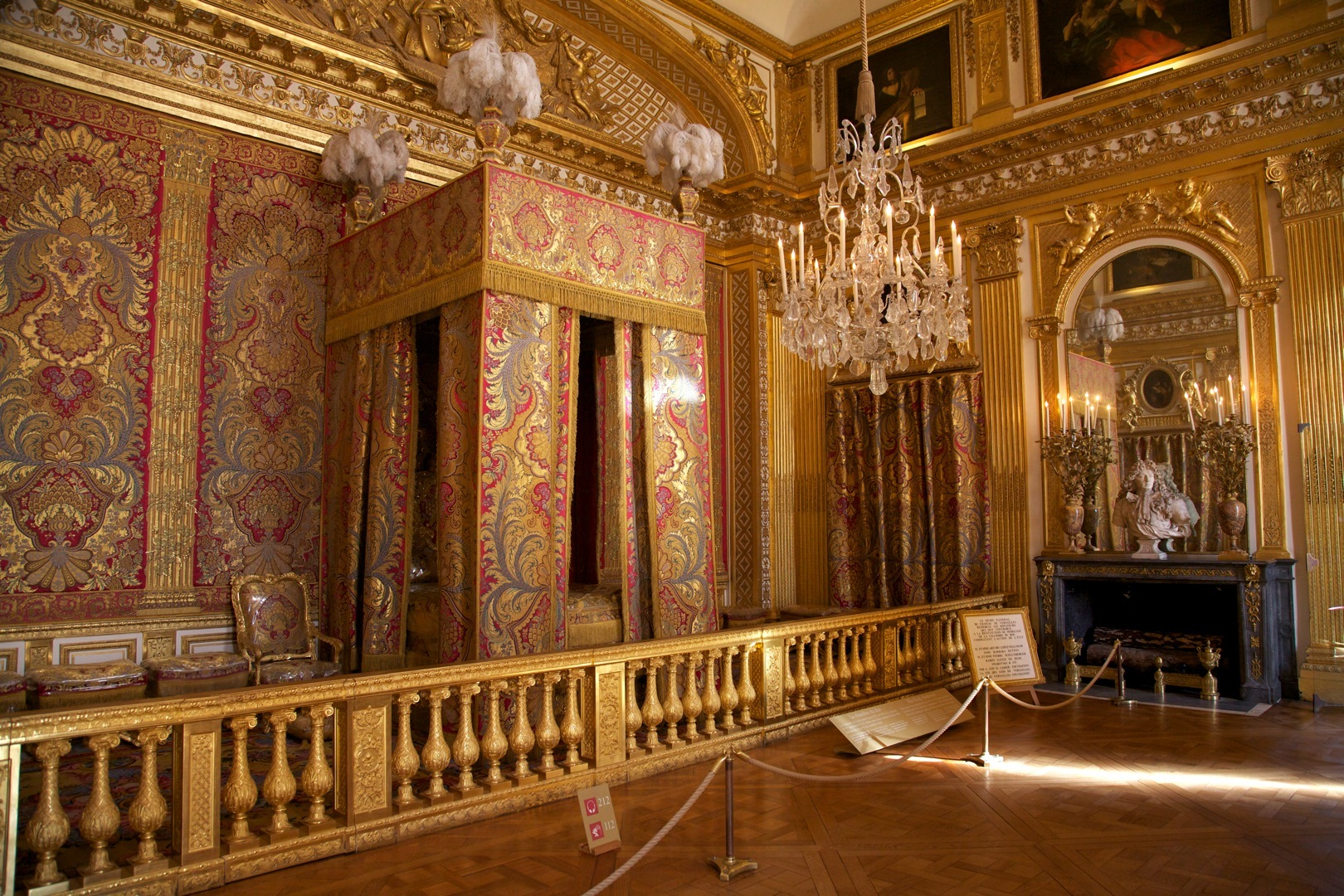
King's bedchamber

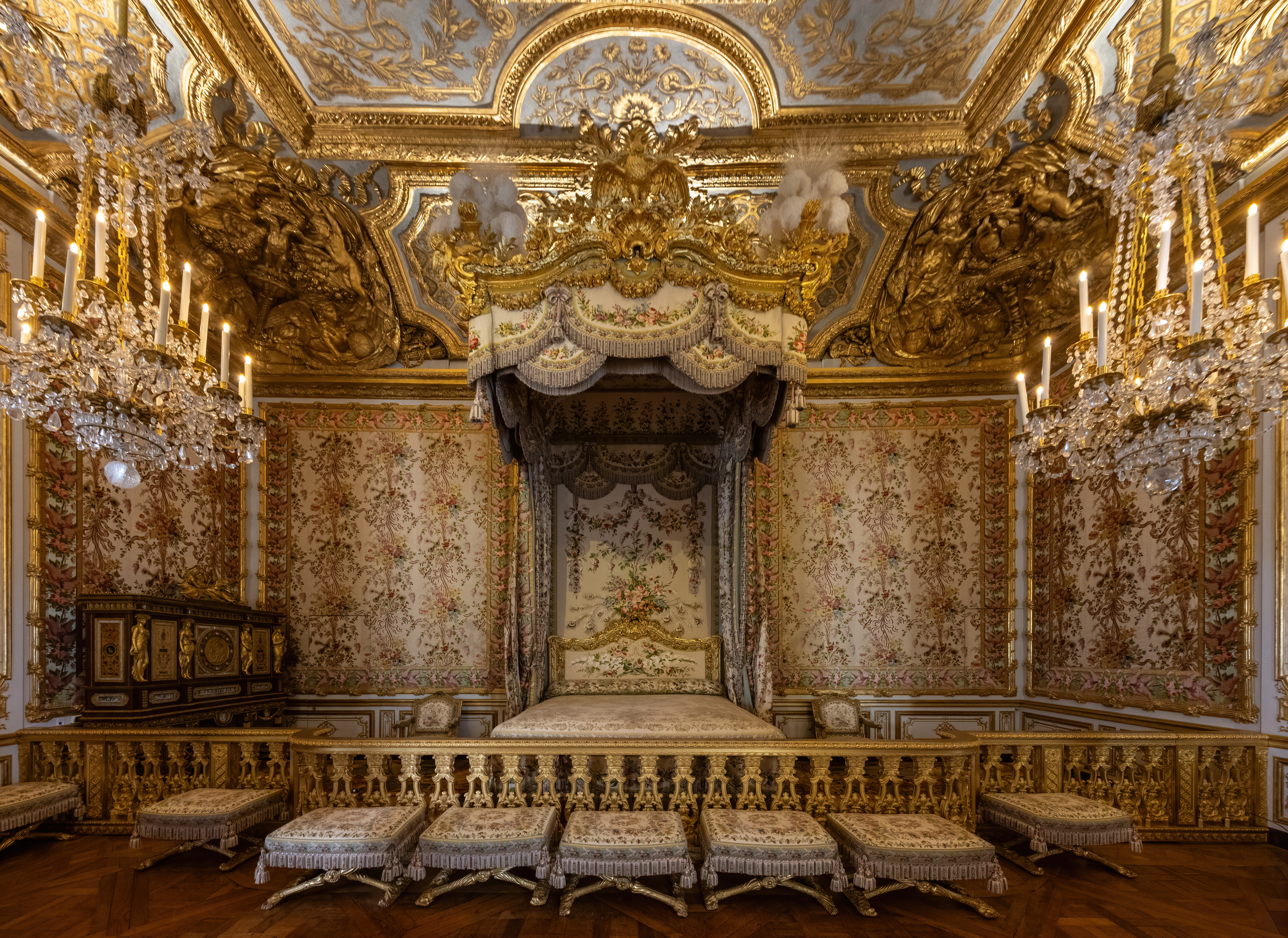
Queen's bedchamber

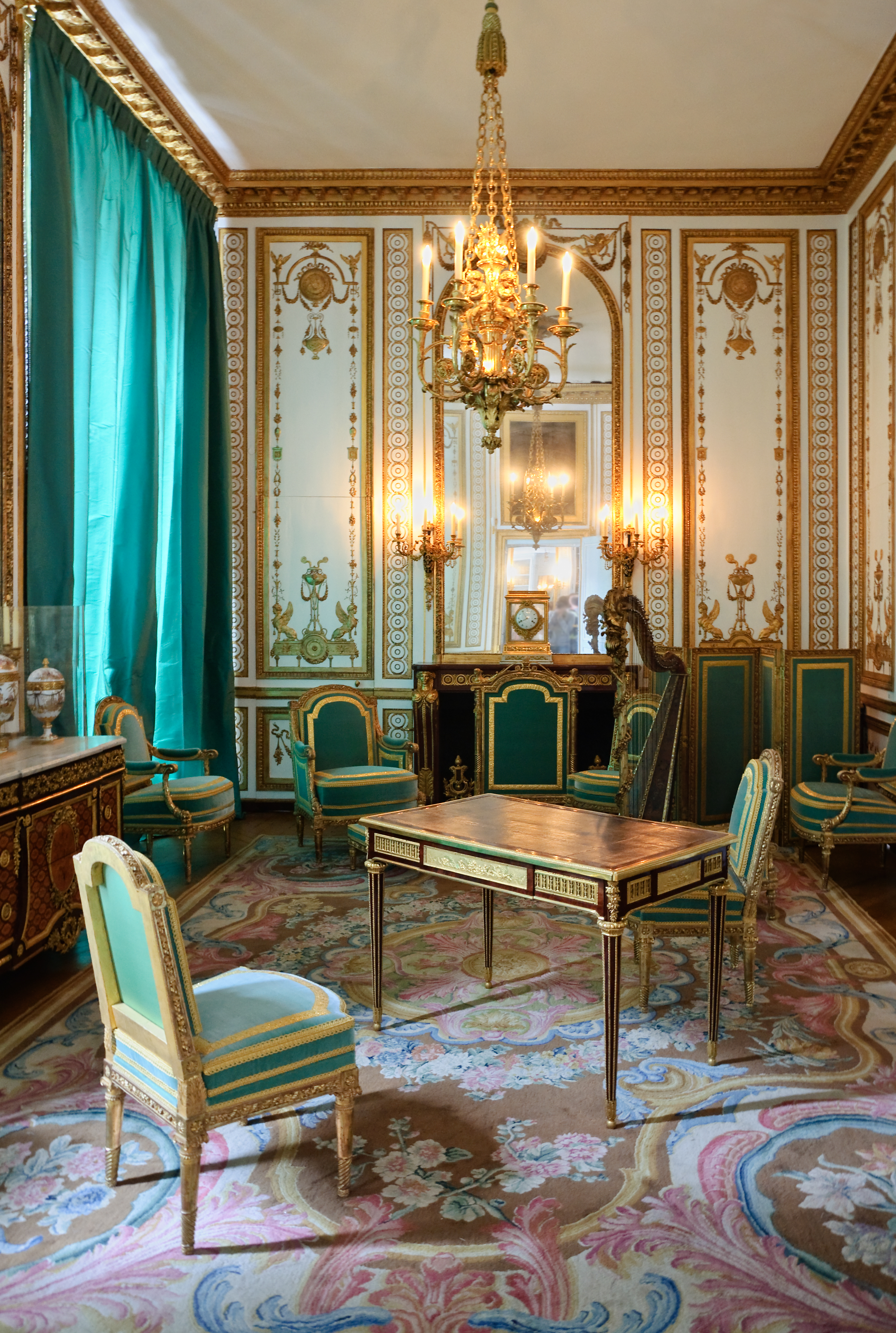
Gilded cabinet of Marie Antoinette

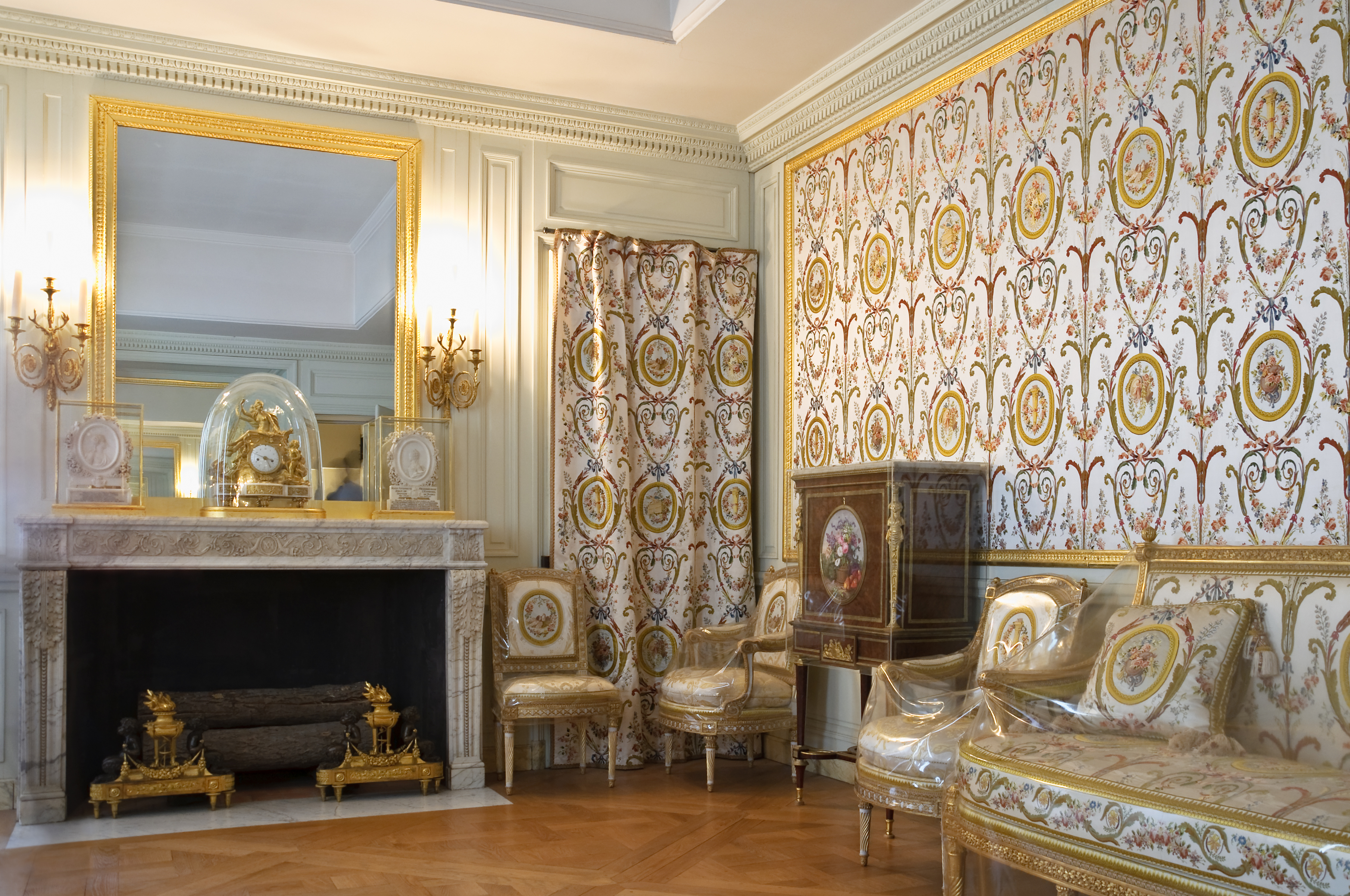
Billiard Room of Marie Antoinette

==== Private apartments of the King ====
The apartments of the King were the heart of the château; they were in the same location as the rooms of Louis XIII, the creator of the château, on the first floor (second floor US style). They were set aside for the personal use of Louis XIV in 1683. He and his successors Louis XV and Louis XVI used these rooms for official functions, such as the ceremonial lever ("waking up") and the coucher ("going to bed") of the monarch, which was attended by a crowd of courtiers.

The King's apartment was accessed from the Hall of Mirrors from the Oeil de Boeuf antechamber or from the Guardroom and the Grand Couvert, the ceremonial room where Louis XIV often took his evening meals, seated alone at a table in front of the fireplace. His spoon, fork, and knife were brought to him in a golden box. The courtiers could watch as he dined.

The King's bedchamber had originally been a Drawing Room before Louis XIV transformed it into his own bedroom in 1701. He died there on 1 September 1715. Both Louis XV and Louis XVI continued to use the bedroom for their official awakening and going to bed. On 6 October 1789, from the balcony of this room Louis XVI and Marie-Antoinette, joined by the Marquis de Lafayette, looked down on the hostile crowd in the courtyard, shortly before the King was forced to return to Paris.

The bed of the King is placed beneath a carved relief by Nicolas Coustou entitled France watching over the sleeping King. The decoration includes several paintings set into the panelling, including a self-portrait of Antony van Dyck.

==== Private apartments of The Queen ====
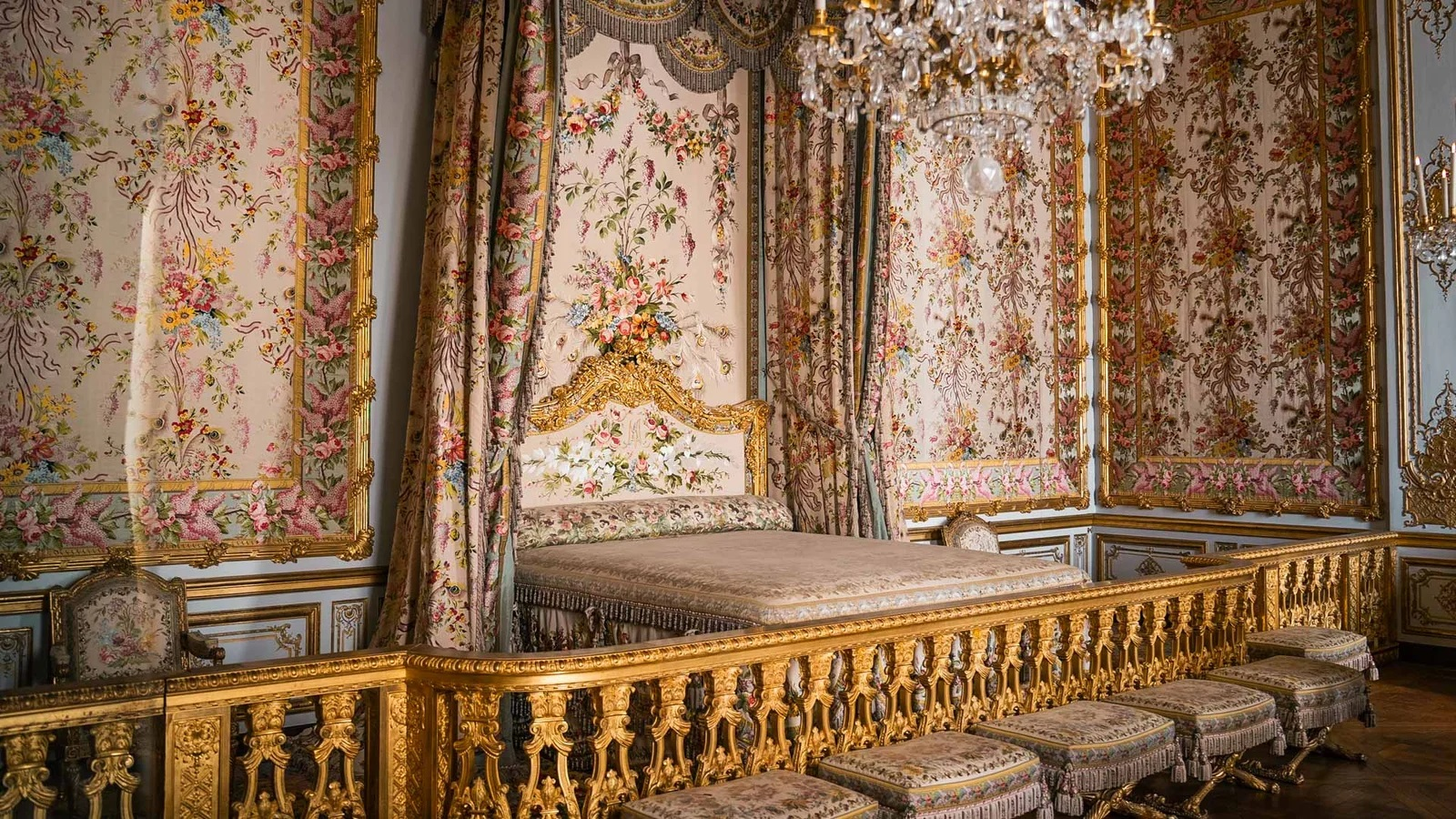
The queens bedchamber, Versailles Palace

The petit appartement de la reine is a suite of rooms that were reserved for the personal use of the queen. Originally arranged for the use of the Maria Theresa of Spain, consort of Louis XIV, the rooms were later modified for use by Marie Leszczyńska and finally for Marie Antoinette. The Queen's apartments and the King's Apartments were laid out on the same design, each suite having seven rooms. Both suites had ceilings painted with scenes from mythology; the King's ceilings featured male figures, the Queen's featured females.

== Hall of Mirrors ==
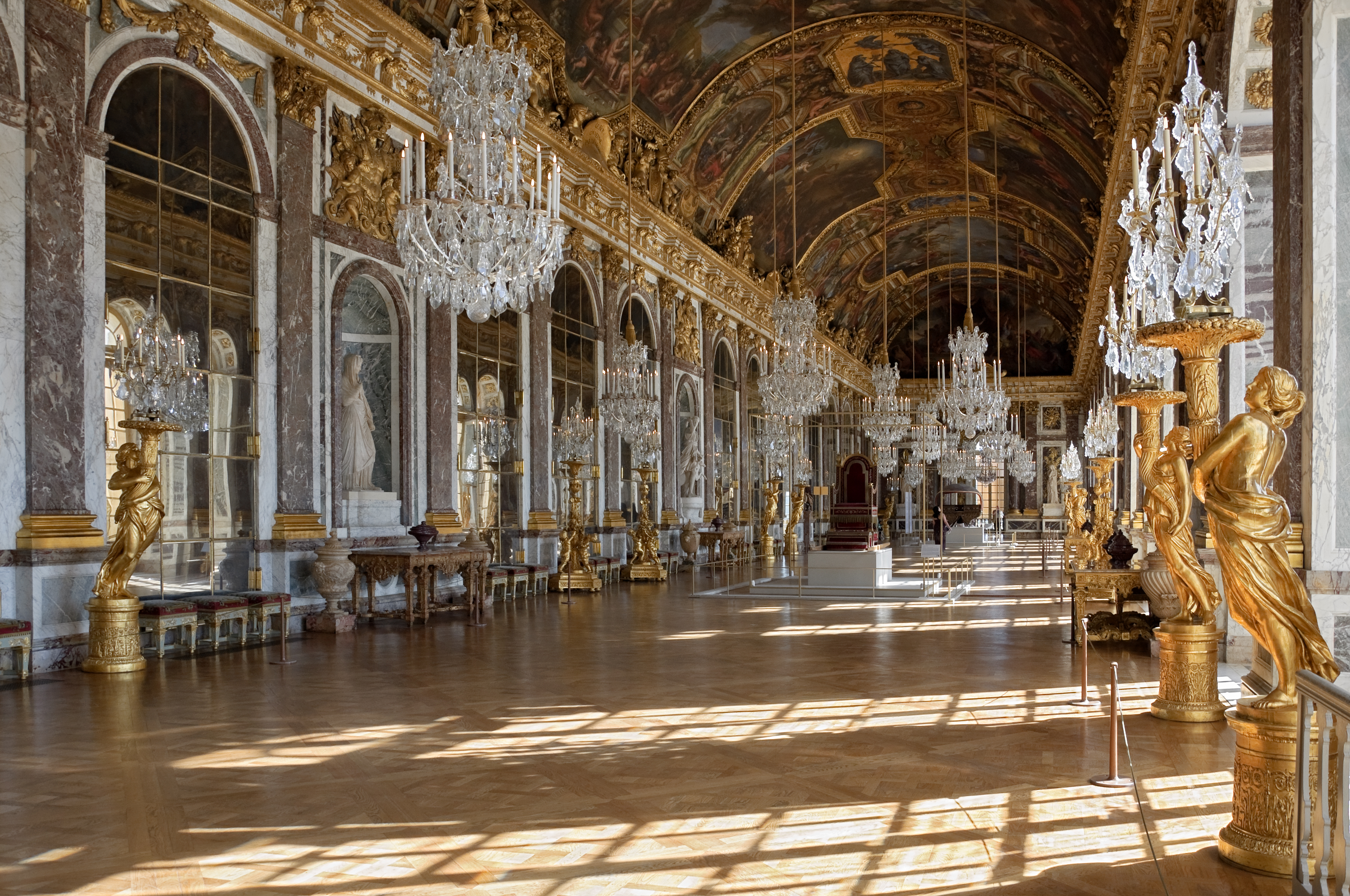
The Hall of Mirrors

The Hall of Mirrors is a long gallery at the westernmost part of the palace that looks out onto the gardens. The hall was built from 1678 to 1681 on the site of a terrace Le Vau built between the king and queen's suites. The hall is clad in marble and decorated in a modified version of the Corinthian order, with 578 mirrors facing 17 windows and reflecting the light provided by them. The ceiling fresco, painted by Le Brun over the next four years, embellishes the first 18 years of Louis XIV's reign in 30 scenes, 17 of which are military victories over the Dutch. The fresco depicts Louis XIV himself alongside Classical figures in the scenes celebrating moments in his reign such as the beginning of personal rule in 1661, breaking from earlier frescoes at Versailles that used allegories derived from Classical and mythological scenes.

The Salon of War and the Salon of Peace bookend the Hall of Mirrors on its northern and southern ends respectively. The Salon of War, constructed and decorated from 1678 to 1686, celebrates French victories in the Franco-Dutch War with marble panels, gilded bronze trophies of arms, and a stucco bas-relief of Louis XIV on horseback riding over his enemies. The Salon of Peace is decorated in the same fashion but according to its eponymous theme.

== Royal Chapel ==
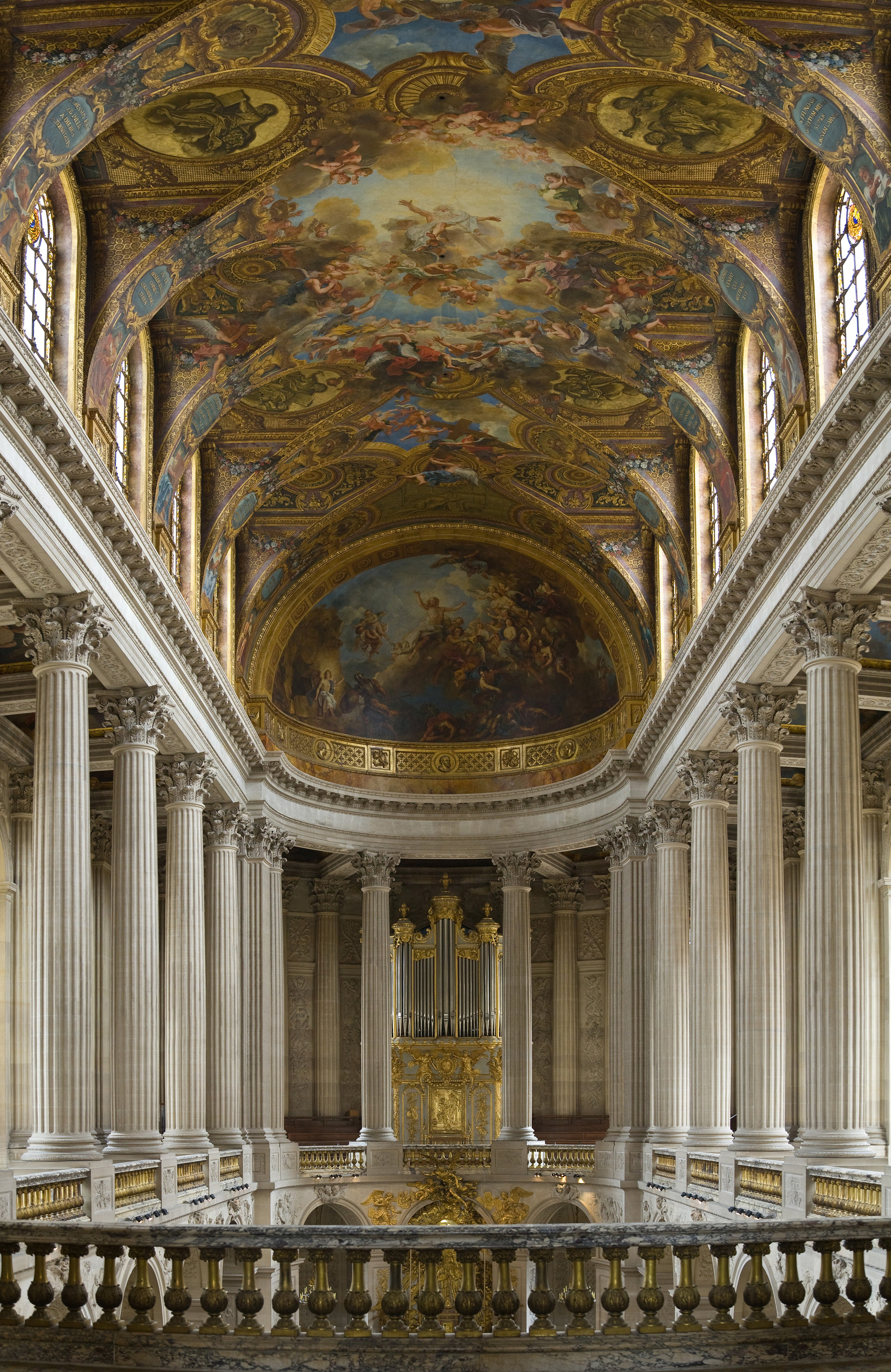
Interior of the Royal Chapel

The Royal Chapel of Versailles is located at the southern end of the north wing. The building stands 40-metre (130 ft) high, and measures 42 metres (138 ft) long and 24 metres (79 ft) wide. The chapel is rectangular with a semicircular apse, combining traditional, Gothic royal French church architecture with the French Baroque style of Versailles. The ceiling of the chapel is constituted by an unbroken vault, divided into three frescos by Antoine Coypel, Charles de La Fosse, and Jean Jouvenet. The palette of motifs beneath the frescoes glorify the deeds of Louis IX, and include images of David, Constantine, Charlemagne, and Louis IX, fleur de lis, and Louis XIV's monogram. The organ of the chapel was built by Robert Clicquot and Julien Tribuot in 1709–1710.

Louis XIV commissioned the chapel, its sixth, from Hardouin-Mansart and Le Brun in 1683–84. It was the last building constructed at Versailles during Louis XIV's reign. Construction was delayed until 1699, however, and it was not completed until 1710. The only major modification to the chapel since its completion was the removal of a lantern from its roof in 1765. A full restoration of the chapel began in late 2017 and lasted into early 2021.

== Royal Opera ==
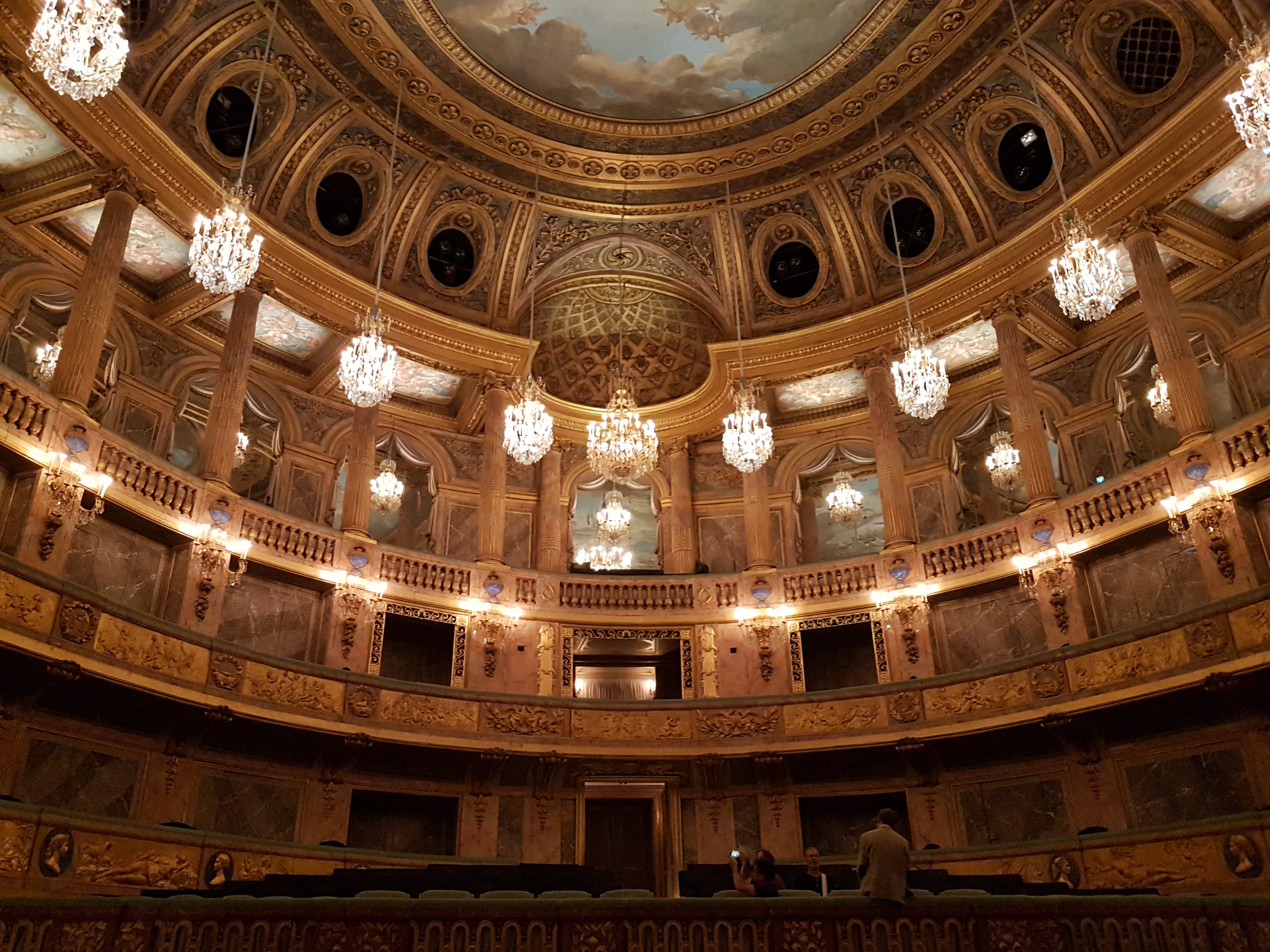
The Opera towards the Royal Box

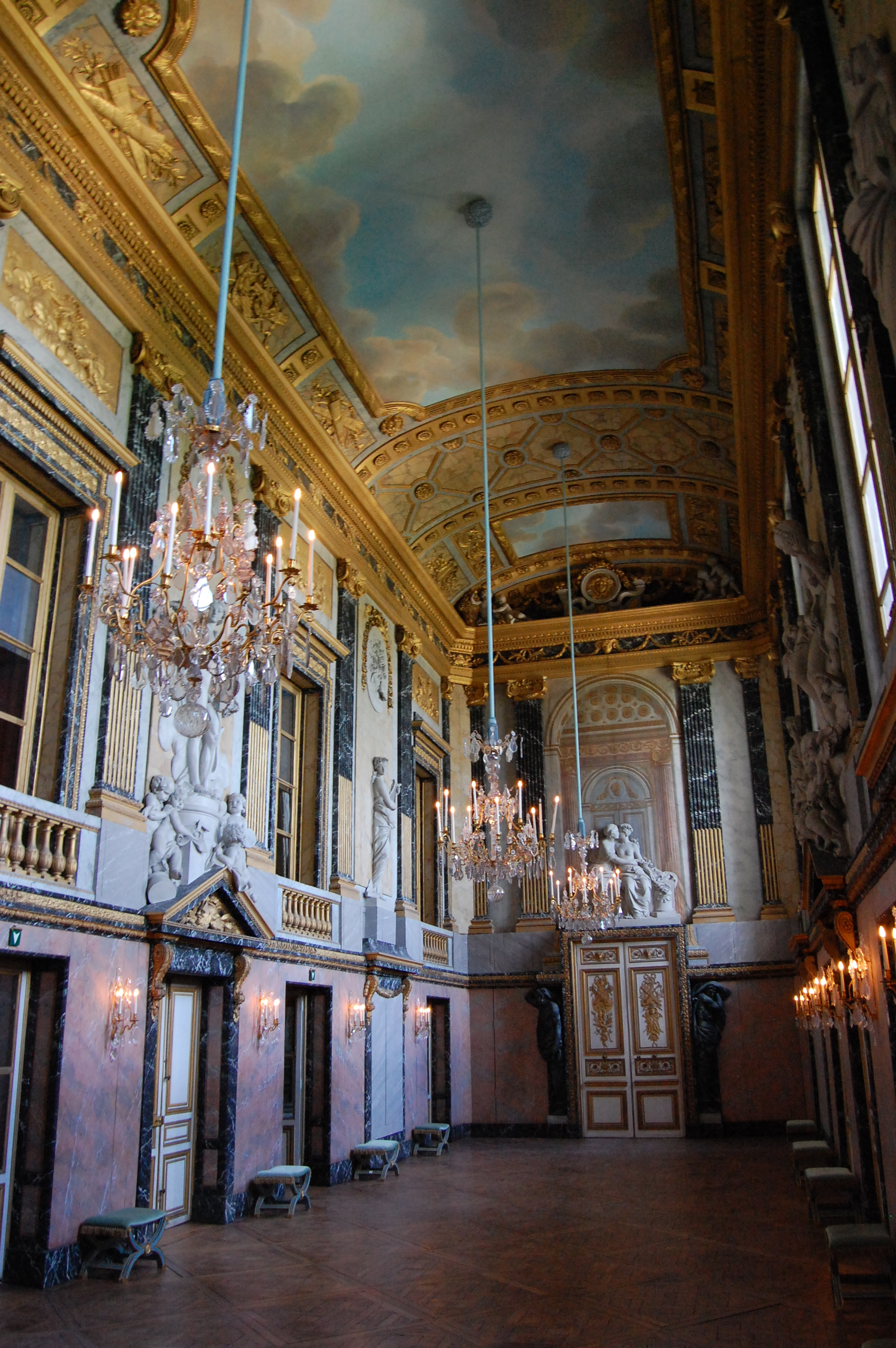
Foyer of the Royal Opera

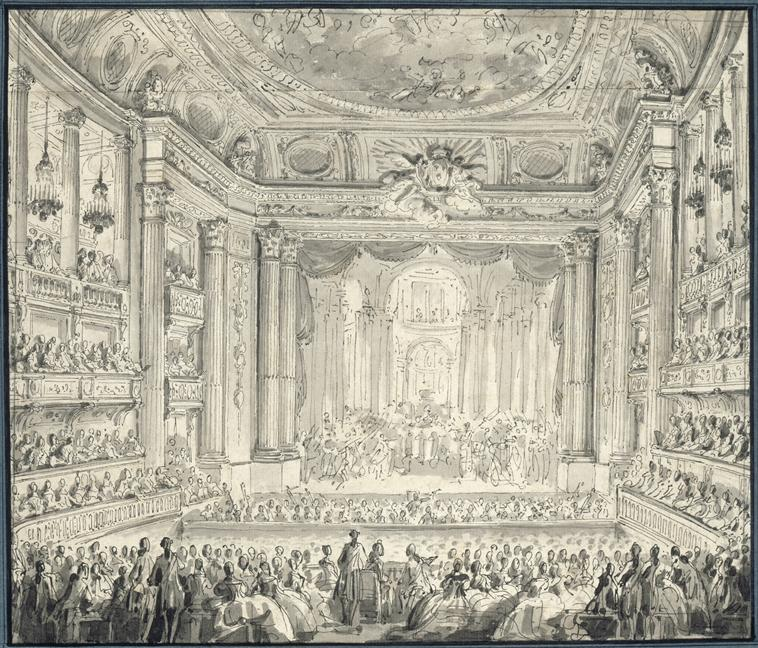
The Royal Opera during the celebration of the marriage of Louis XVI and Marie-Antoinette (1770)

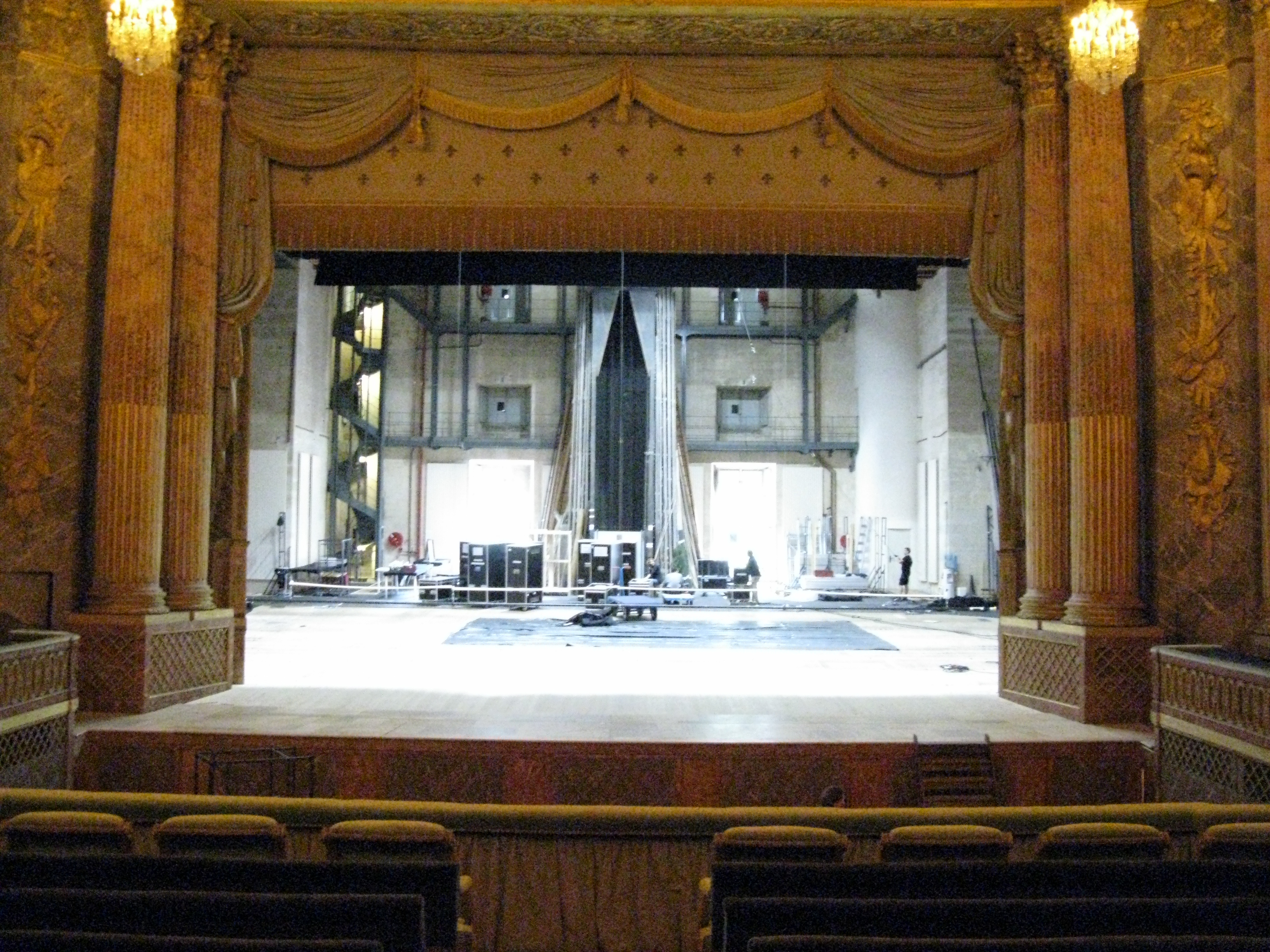
Stage of the Royal Opera

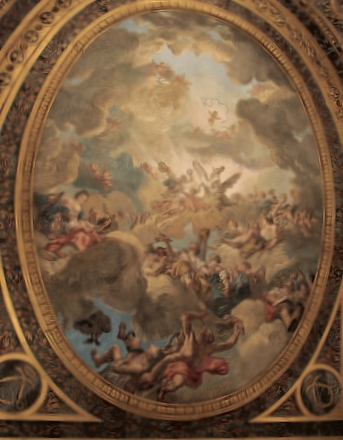
Ceiling of the opera, painted by Louis Jean-Jacques Durameau

The Royal Opera of Versailles was originally commissioned by Louis XIV in 1682 and was to be built at the end of the North Wing with a design by Hardouin-Mansart and Carlo Vigarani. However, due to the expense of the King's continental wars, the project was put aside. The idea was revived by Louis XV with a new design by Ange-Jacques Gabriel in 1748, but this was also temporarily put aside. The project was revived and rushed ahead for the planned celebration of the marriage of the Dauphin, the future Louis XVI, and Marie Antoinette. For economy and speed, the new opera was built almost entirely of wood, which also gave it very high quality acoustics. The wood was painted to resemble marble, and the ceiling was decorated with a painting of the Apollo, the god of the arts, preparing crowns for illustrious artists, by Louis Jean-Jacques Durameau. The sculptor Augustin Pajou added statuary and reliefs to complete the decoration. The new Opera was inaugurated on 16 May 1770, as part of the celebration of the royal wedding.

In October 1789, early in the French Revolution, the last banquet for the royal guardsmen was hosted by the King in the opera, before he departed for Paris. Following the Franco-German War in 1871 and then the Paris Commune until 1875, the French National Assembly met in the opera, until the proclamation of the French Third Republic and the return of the government to Paris.

== Museum of the History of France ==
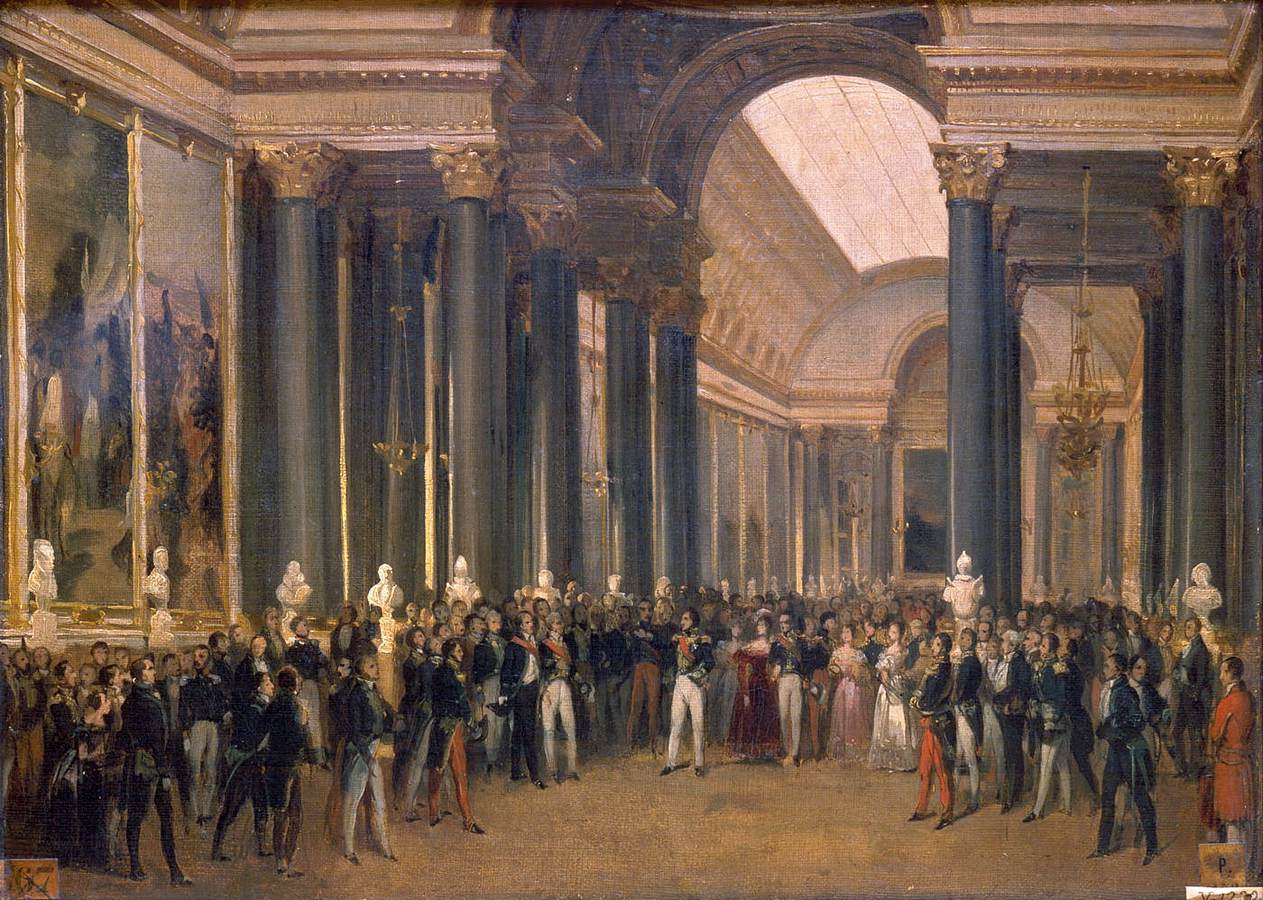
Louis Philippe dedicates the Galerie des Batailles, by François Joseph Heim (1837)

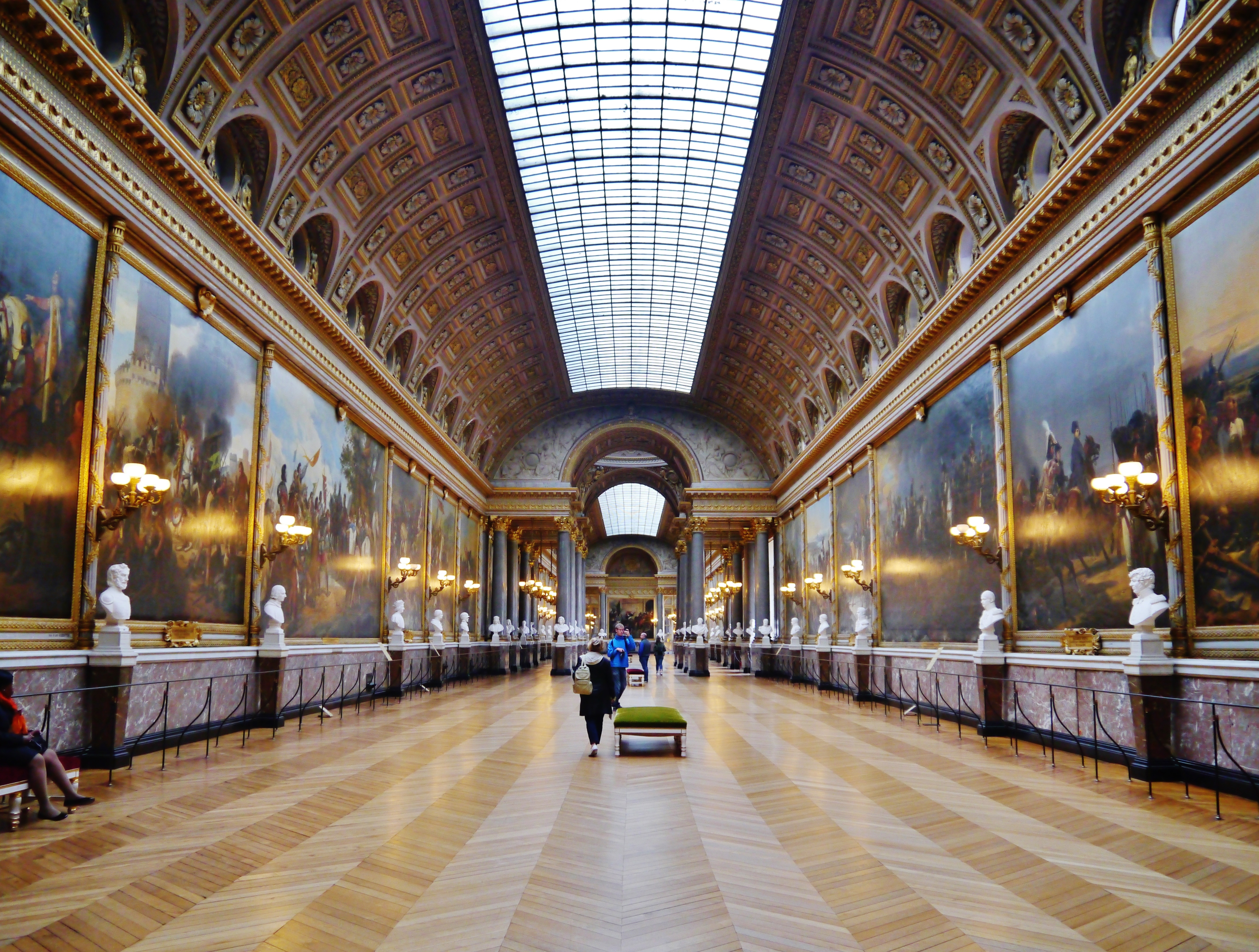
The Gallery of Battles in the Museum of the History of France

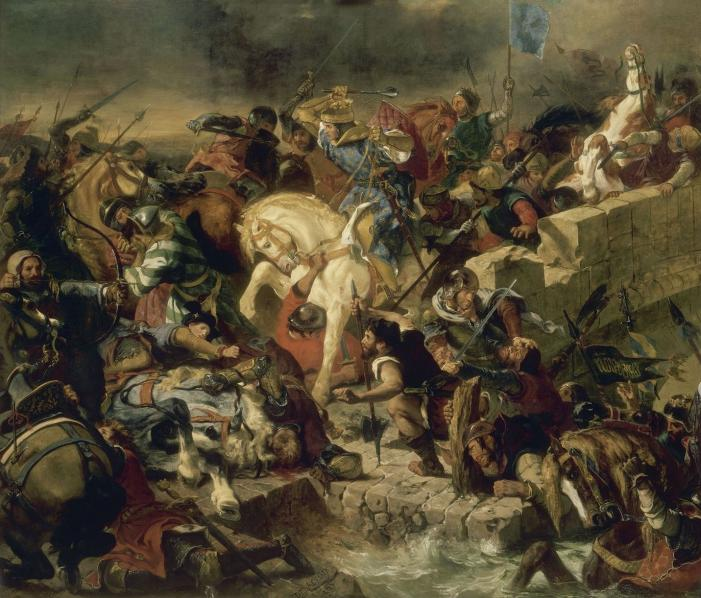
The Battle of Taillebourg, by Eugène Delacroix (1837)

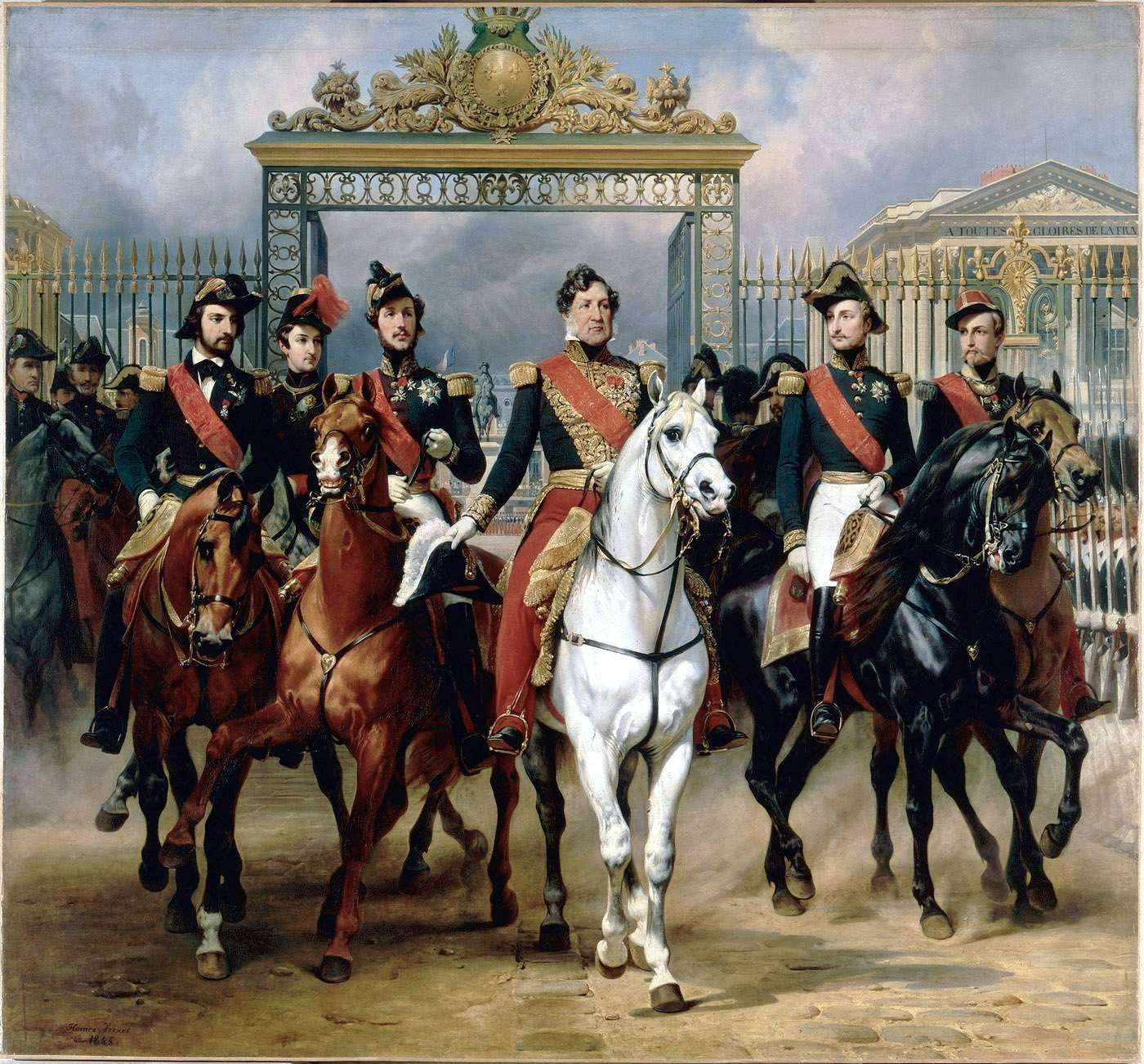
Louis Philippe and his sons pose before the gates of Versailles, by Horace Vernet History Gallery, (1846)

Shortly after becoming king in 1830, Louis Philippe I decided to transform the palace into a museum devoted to "All the Glories of France," with paintings and sculpture depicting famous French victories and heroes. Most of the apartments of the palace were entirely demolished (in the main building, practically all of the apartments were annihilated, with only the apartments of the king and queen remaining almost intact), and turned into a series of several large rooms and galleries: the Coronation Room (whose original volume was left untouched by Louis-Philippe), which displays the celebrated painting of the coronation of Napoleon I by Jacques-Louis David; the Hall of Battles; commemorating French victories with large-scale paintings; and the 1830 room, which celebrated Louis-Philippe's own coming to power in the French Revolution of 1830. Some paintings were brought from the Louvre, including works depicting events in French history by Philippe de Champaigne, Pierre Mignard, Laurent de La Hyre, Charles Le Brun, Adam Frans van der Meulen, Nicolas de Largillière, Hyacinthe Rigaud, Jean-Antoine Houdon, Jean-Marc Nattier, Élisabeth Vigée Le Brun, Hubert Robert, Thomas Lawrence, Jacques-Louis David, and Antoine-Jean Gros. Others were commissioned especially for the museum by prominent artists of the early 19th century, including Eugène Delacroix, who painted Saint Louis at the French victory over the British in the Battle of Taillebourg in 1242. Other painters featured include Horace Vernet and François Gérard. A monumental painting by Vernet features Louis Philippe himself, with his sons, posing in front of the gates of the palace.

The overthrow of Louis Philippe in 1848 put an end to his grand plans for the museum, but the Gallery of Battles is still as it was, and is passed through by many visitors to the royal apartments and grand salons. Another set of rooms on the first floor has been made into galleries on Louis XIV and his court, displaying furniture, paintings, and sculptures. In recent years, eleven rooms on the ground floor between the Chapel and the Opera have been turned into a history of the palace, with audiovisual displays and models.

== Estate of Versailles ==
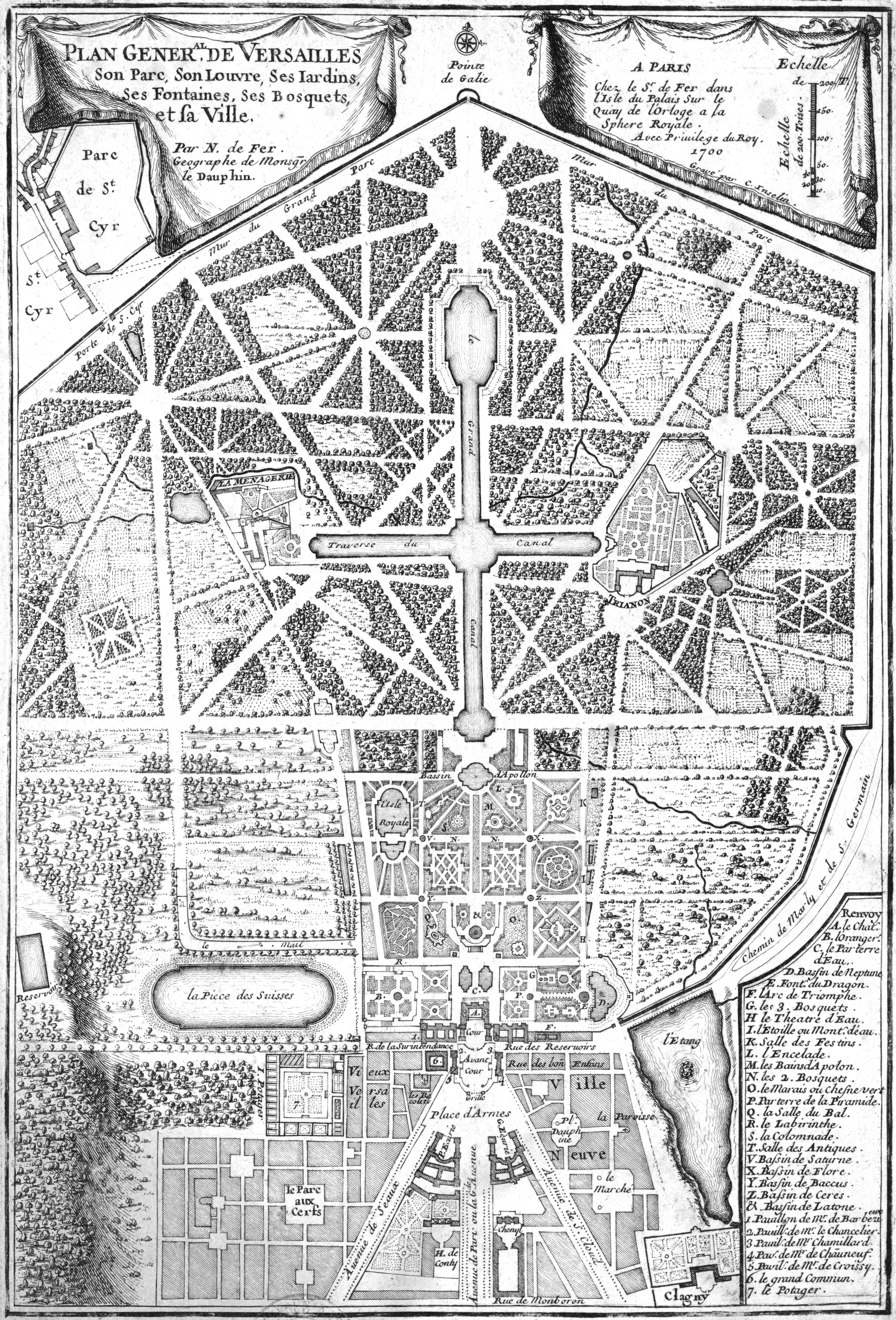
The palace, park, and gardens of Versailles around 1700, mapped by Nicolas de Fer and engraved by Charles Inselin. North is to the right.

The estate of Versailles consists of the palace, the subsidiary buildings around it, and its park and gardens. As of June 2021, the estate altogether covers an area of 800 hectares (8.0 km^{2}; 2,000 acres), with the park and gardens laid out to the south, west, and north of the palace. The palace is approached from the east by the Avenue de Paris, measuring 27 kilometres (17 mi) from Paris to a gate between the Grande and Petite Écuries. Beyond these stables is the Place d'Armes, where the Avenue de Paris meets the Avenue de Sceaux and Avenue de Saint-Cloud (see map), the three roads that formed the main arteries of the city of Versailles. Exactly where the three roads meet is a gate leading into the cour d'honneur, hemmed in by the Ministers' Wings. Beyond is the Royal Gate and the main palace, which wraps around the Royal and finally Marble Courts.

The estate was established by Louis XIII as a hunting retreat, with a park just to the west of his château. From 1661, Louis XIV expanded the estate until, at its greatest extent, the estate was made up by the Grand Parc, a hunting ground of 15,000 hectares (150 km^{2}; 37,000 acres), and the gardens, called the Petit Parc, which covered 1,700 hectares (17 km^{2}; 4,200 acres). A 40-kilometre-long (25 mi), 3-metre-high (10 ft) wall with 24 gateways enclosed the estate.

The landscape of the estate had to be created from the bog that surrounded Louis XIII's château using landscape architecture usually employed in fortress building. The approach to the palace and the gardens were carefully laid out via the moving of earth and construction of terraces. The water from the marsh was marshalled into a series of lakes and ponds around Versailles, but these reservoirs were not sufficient for the palace, city, or gardens. Great lengths were taken to supply Versailles with water, such as the damming of the river Bièvre to create an inflow in the 1660s, the construction of an enormous pumping station at the river Seine near Marly-le-Roi in 1681, and an attempt to divert water from the river Eure with a canal in the later 1680s.

=== Gardens ===
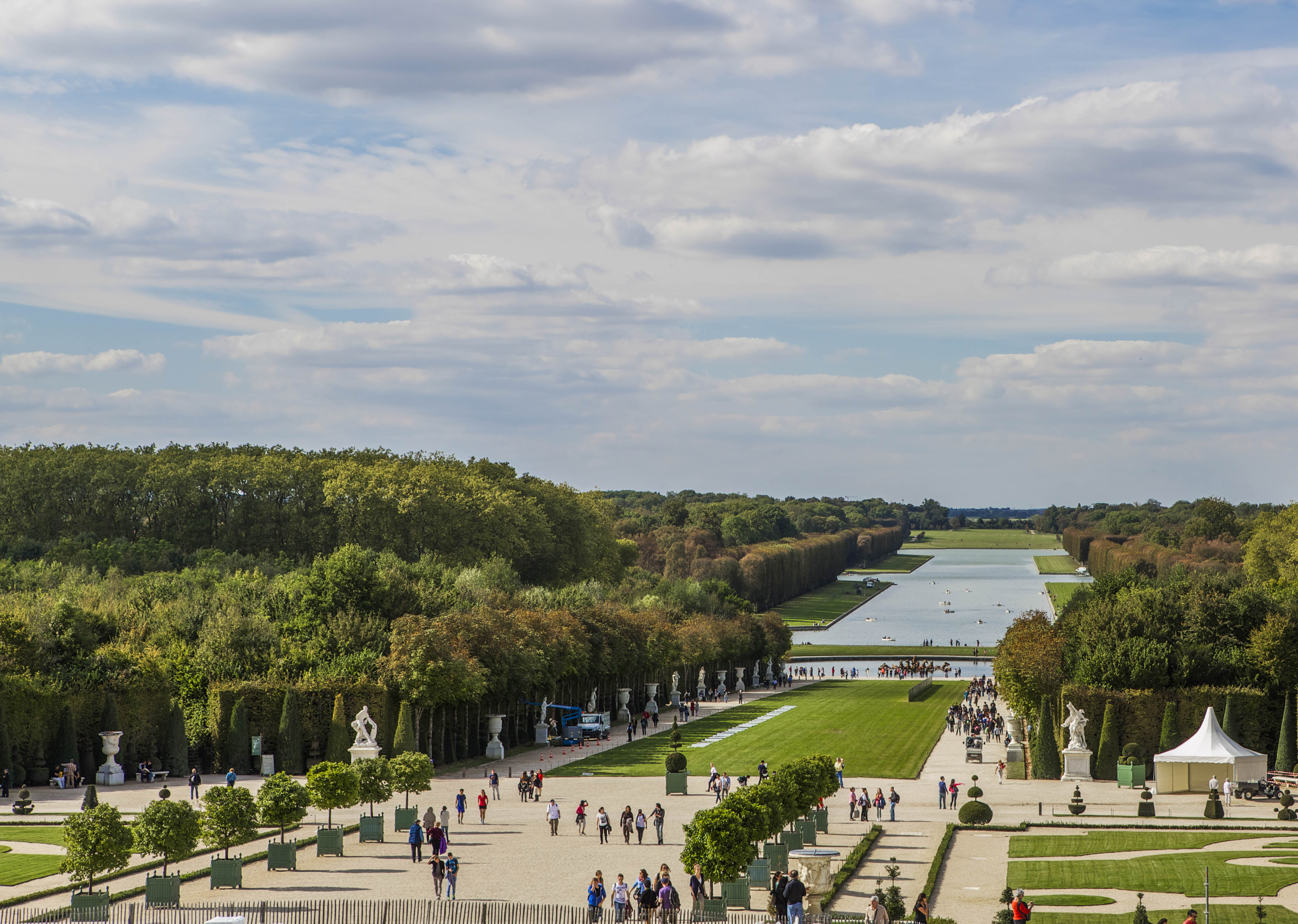
View of the gardens of Versailles, looking northwest from the palace

The gardens of Versailles, as they have existed since the reign of Louis XIV, are the work of André Le Nôtre. Le Nôtre's gardens were preceded by a simple garden laid out in the 1630s by landscape architects Jacques Boyceau and Jacques de Nemours, which he rearranged along an east–west axis that, because of Louis XIV's land purchases and the clearing of woodland, were expanded literally as far as could be seen. The resulting gardens were a collaboration between Le Nôtre, Le Brun, Colbert, and Louis XIV, marked by rigid order, discipline, and open space, with axial paths, flowerbeds, hedges, and ponds and lakes as motifs. They became the epitome of the French formal garden style, and have been very influential and widely imitated or reproduced.

=== Subsidiary structures ===
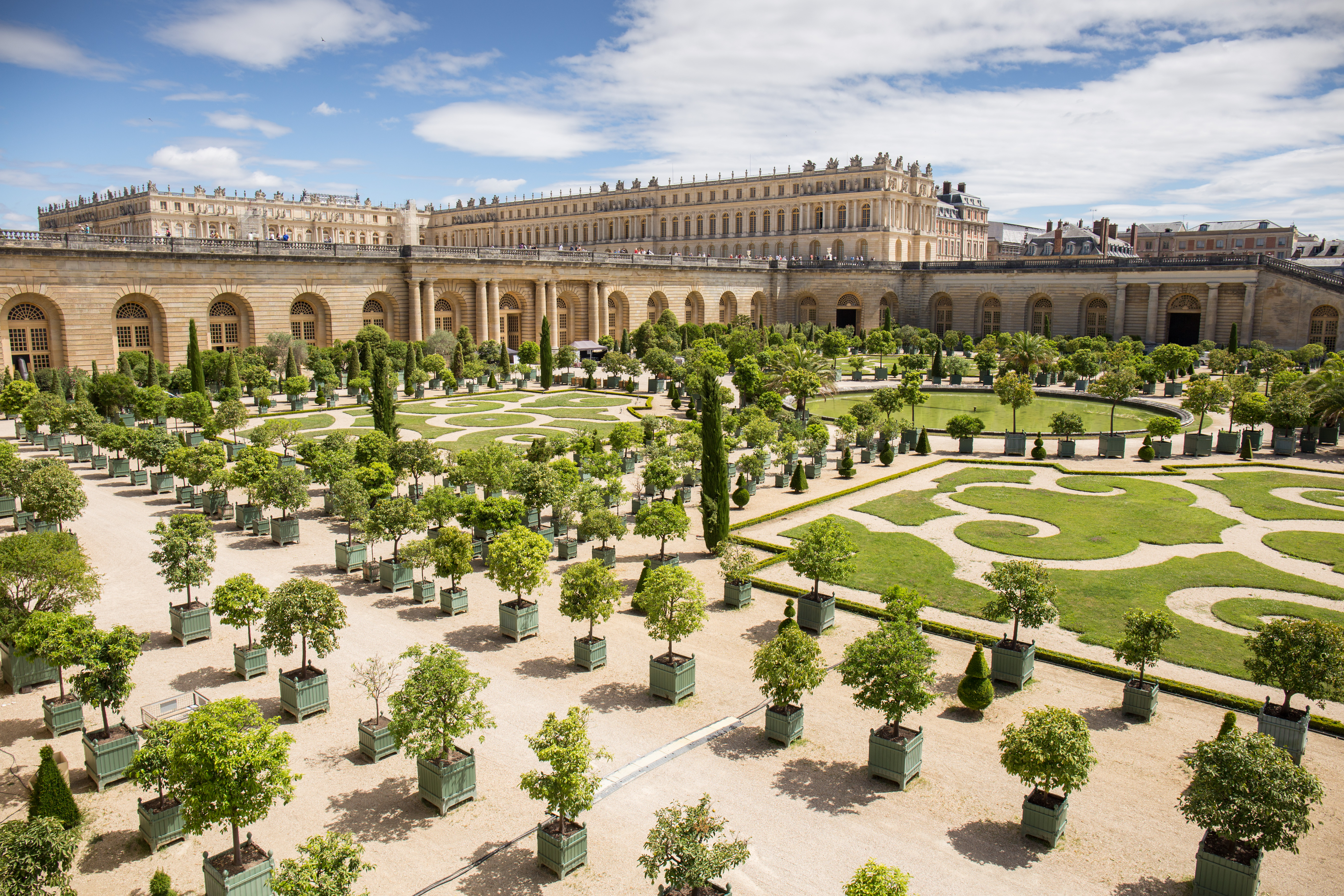
The Versailles Orangery

The first of the subsidiary structures of the Palace of Versailles was the Versailles Menagerie, built by Le Vau between the years 1662 and 1664, at the southern end of the Grand Canal. The apartments, overlooking the pens, were renovated by Hardouin-Mansart from 1698 to 1700, but the Menagerie fell into disuse in 1712. (Note: The animals of the Menagerie, abandoned after the Revolution, were moved to Paris and became the foundation of the menagerie of the Jardin des Plantes, the second-oldest public zoo in the world.) After a long period of decay, it was demolished in 1801. The Versailles Orangery, just to the south of the palace, was first built by Le Vau in 1663, originally as part of the general moving of earth to create the Estate. It was also modified by Mansart, who, from 1681 to 1685, totally rebuilt it and doubled its size.

In late 1679, Louis XIV commissioned Mansart to build the Château de Marly, a retreat at the edge of Versailles's estate, about 8.0 kilometres (5 mi) from the palace. The château consisted of a primary residential building and twelve pavilions, in Palladian style placed in two rows on either side of the main building. Construction was completed in 1686, when Louis XIV spent his first night there. The château was nationalized and sold in 1799, and subsequently demolished and replaced with industrial buildings. These were themselves demolished in 1805, and then in 1811 the estate was purchased by Napoleon. On 1 June 2009, the grounds of the Château de Marly were ceded to the Public Establishment of the Palace, Museum and National Estate of Versailles.

La Lanterne, is a hunting lodge named after the lantern that topped the nearby Menagerie that was built in 1787 by Philippe Louis de Noailles, then the palace governor. It has since 1960 been a state residence.

=== The Grand Trianon ===
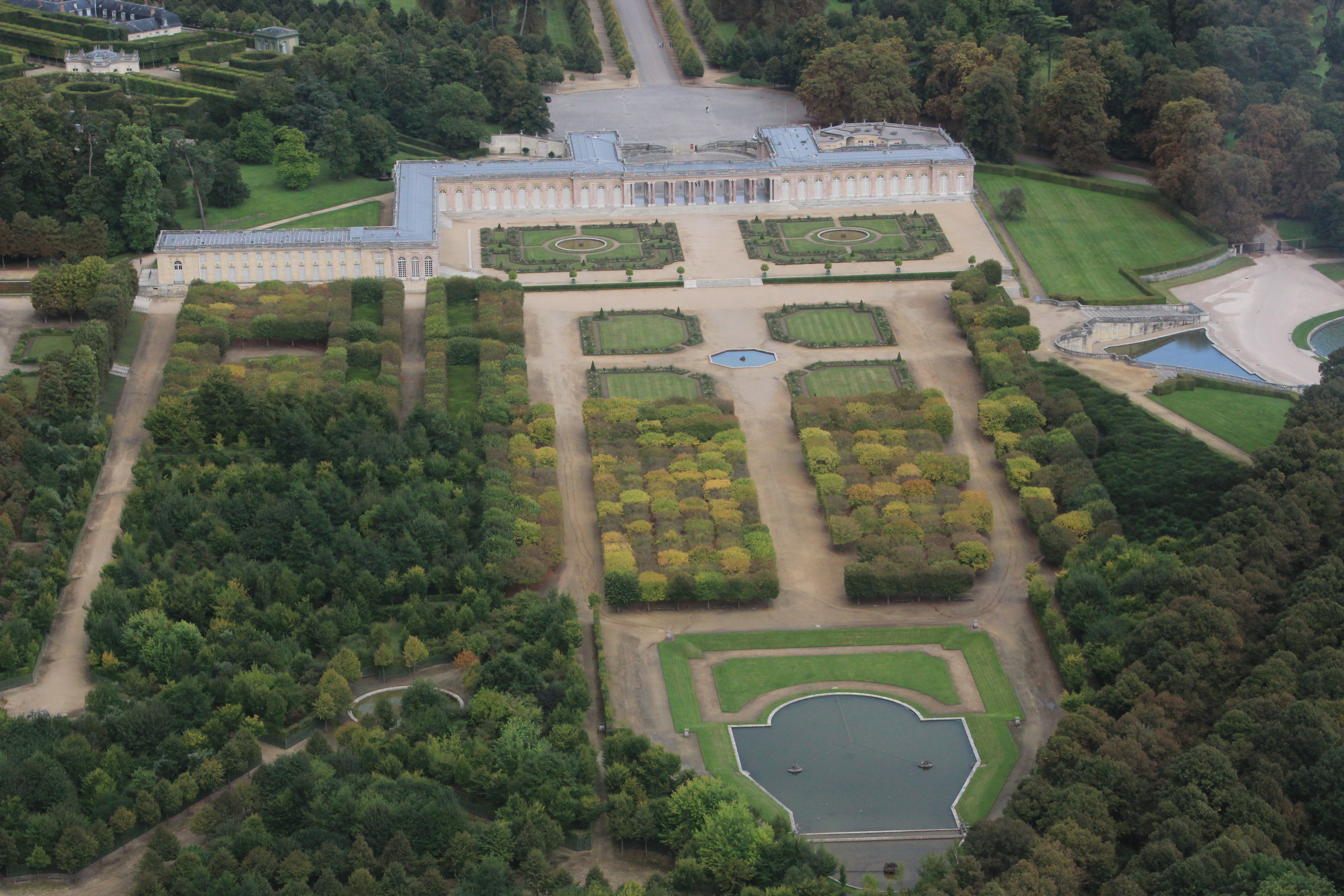
The Grand Trianon with courtyard and gardens. The wing at left is a residence of the President of France.

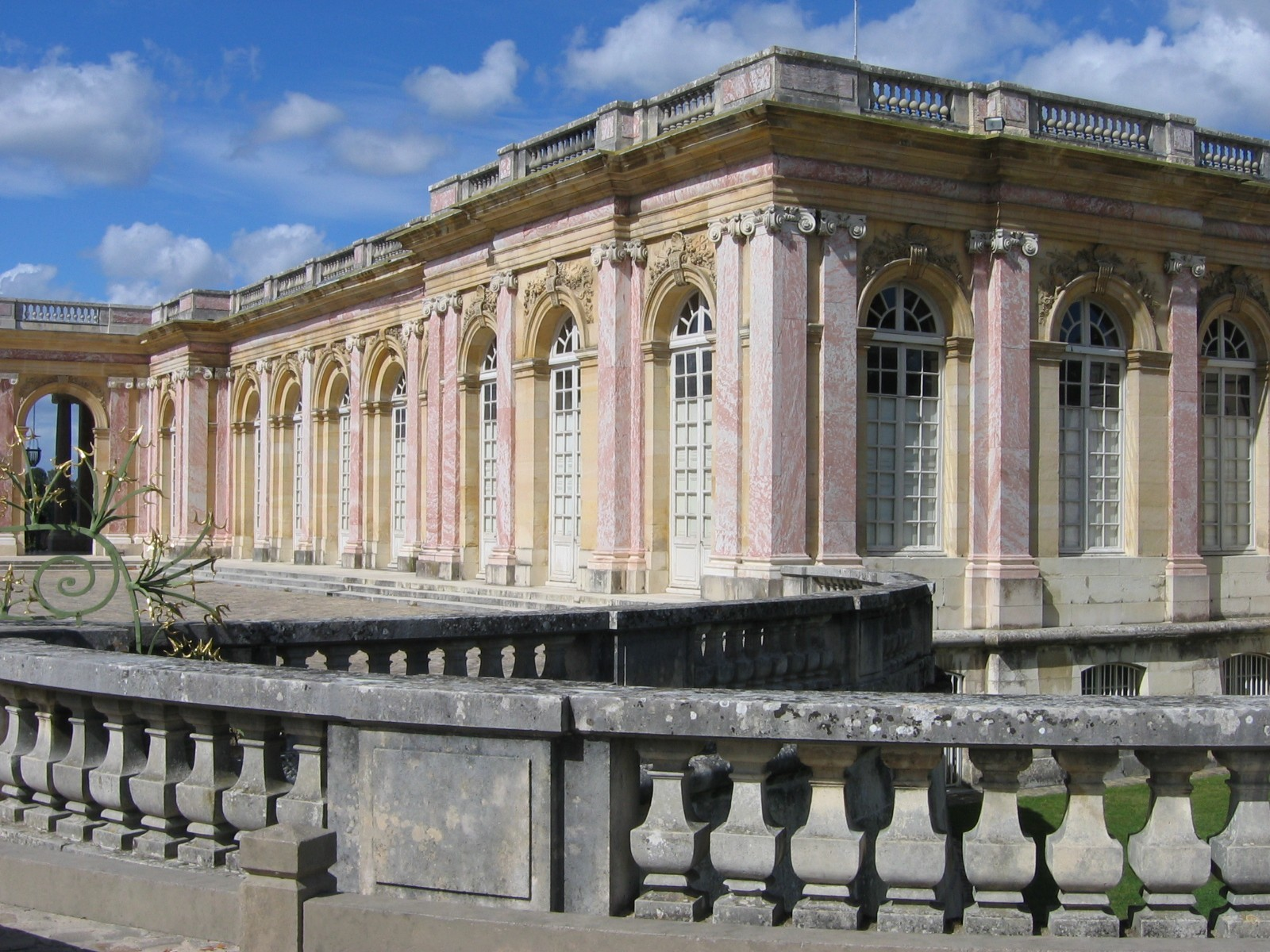
The Grand Trianon

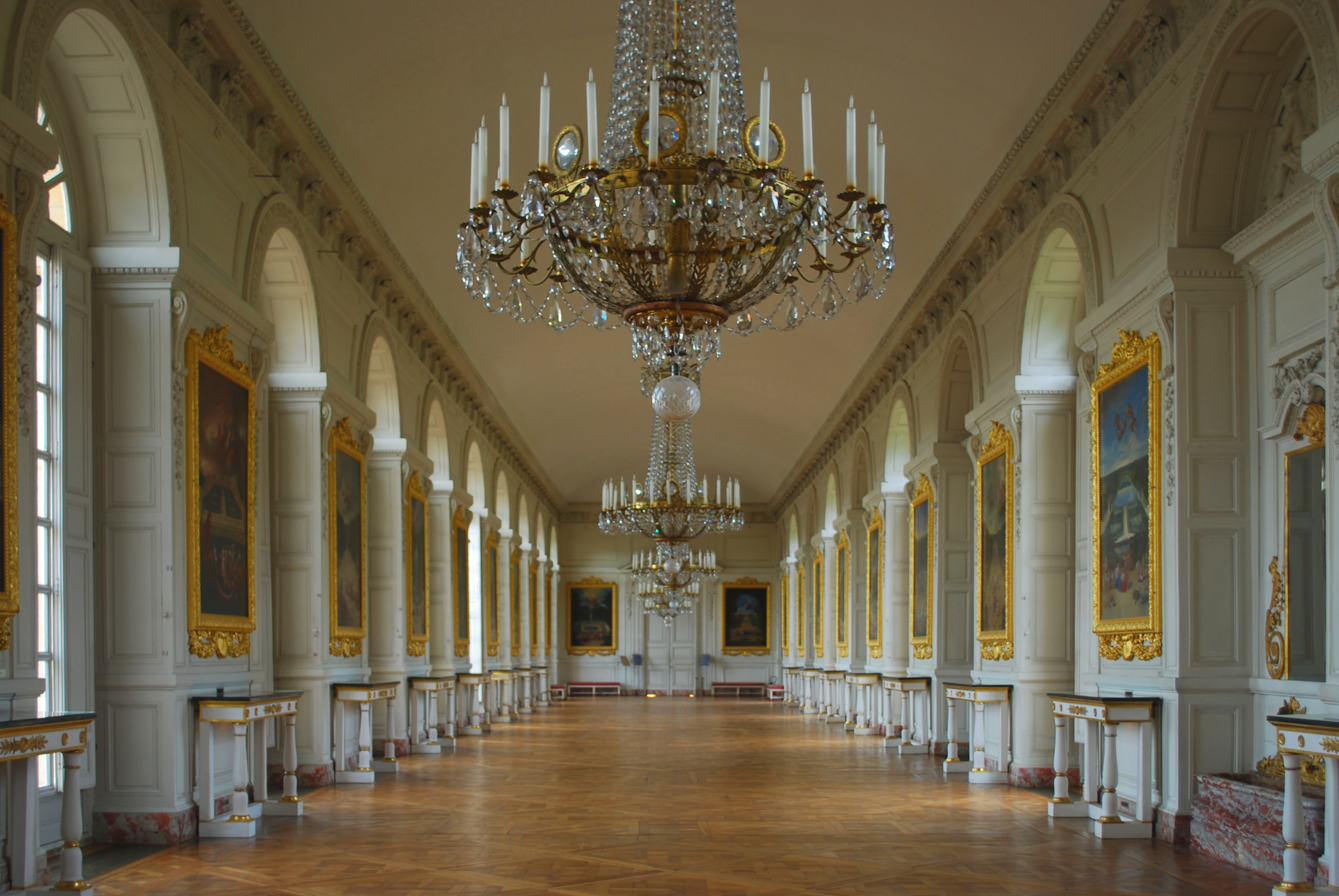
Interior of the Grand Trianon

In 1668, Louis XIV purchased and demolished the hamlet of Trianon, near the northern tip of the Grand Canal, and in its place, he commissioned Le Vau to construct a retreat from court, remembered as the Porcelain Trianon. Designed and built by Le Vau in 1670, it was the first example of Chinoiserie (faux Chinese) architecture in Europe, though it was largely designed in French style. The roof was clad not with porcelain but with delftware, and was thus prone to leaks, so in 1687 Louis XIV ordered it demolished. Nevertheless, the Porcelain Trianon was itself influential and copycats were built across Europe.

To replace the Porcelain Trianon, Louis XIV tasked Hardouin-Mansart with the construction in 1687 of the Grand Trianon, built from marble in three months. The Grand Trianon has a single story, except for its attached service wing, which was modified by Hardouin-Mansart in 1705–06. The east façade has a courtyard while the west faces the gardens of the Grand Trianon, and between them a peristyle. The interiors are mostly original, and housed Louis XIV, the Madame de Maintenon, Marie Leszczyńska, and Napoleon, who ordered restorations to the building. Under Charles de Gaulle, the north wing of the Grand Trianon became a residence of the President of France.

=== Petit Trianon ===
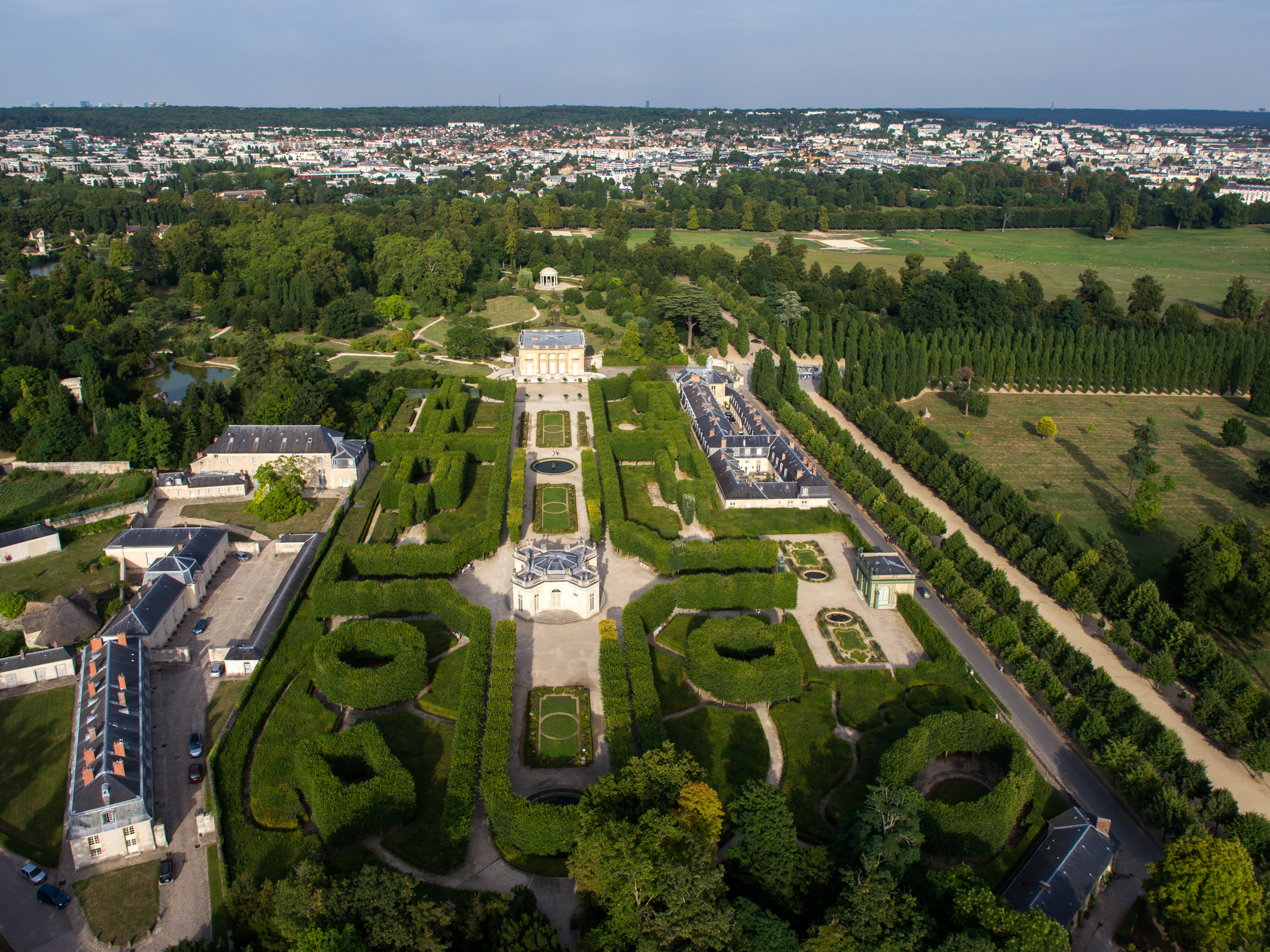
Aerial view of the Petit Trianon and its gardens

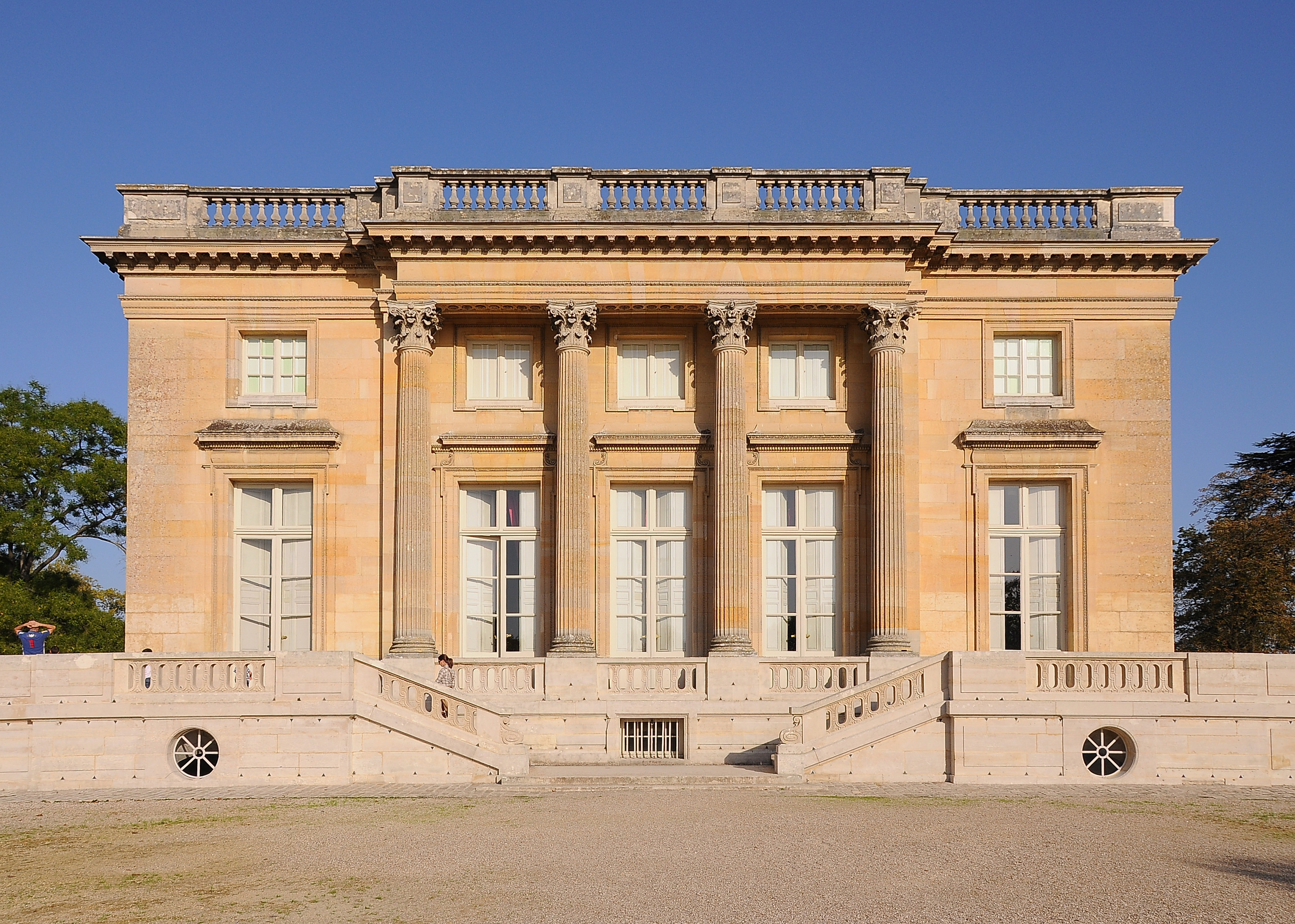
West façade of the Petit Trianon

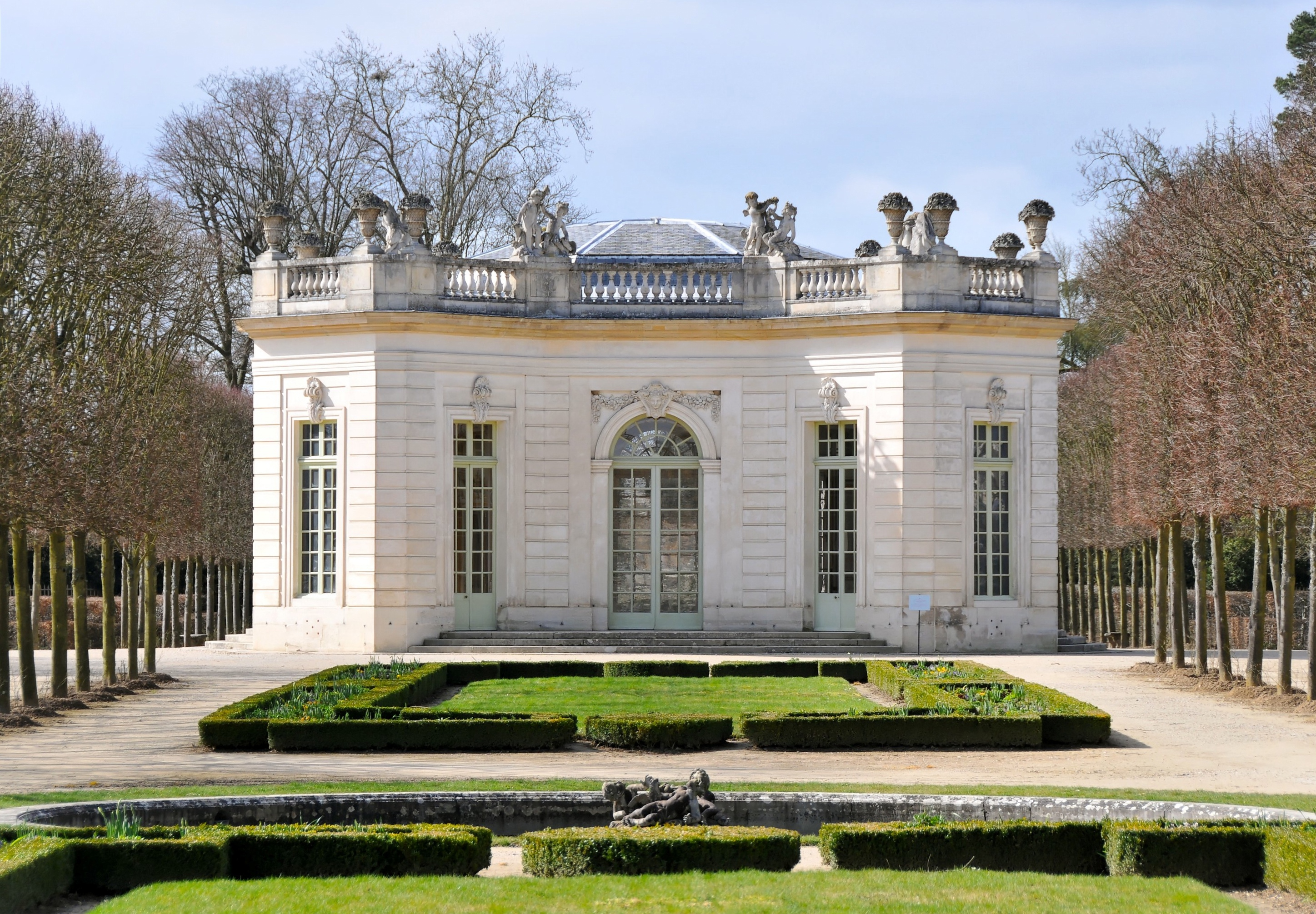
The French Pavilion of the Petit Trianon

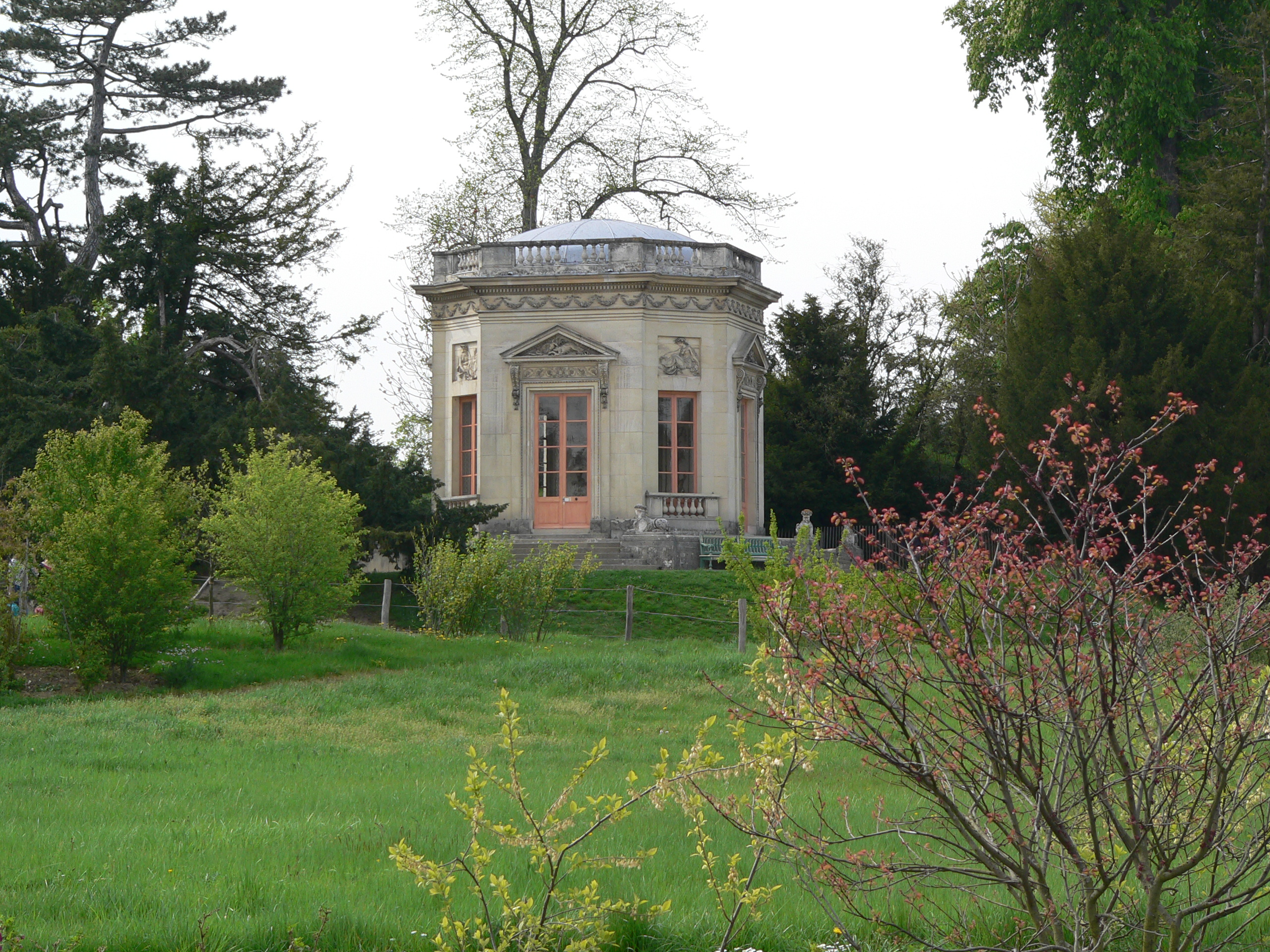
The Belvedere in the park of the Petit Trianon

The Petit Trianon, whose construction from 1762 to 1768 led to the advent of the names "Grand" and "Petit Trianon", was constructed for Louis XV and the Madame du Barry in the Neoclassical style by Gabriel. The building has a piano nobile, basement, and attic, with five windows on each floor. On becoming king, Louis XVI gave the Petit Trianon to Marie Antoinette, who remodeled it, relaid its gardens in the then-current English and Oriental styles, and formed her own court there.

=== The Queen's hamlet and Theatre ===
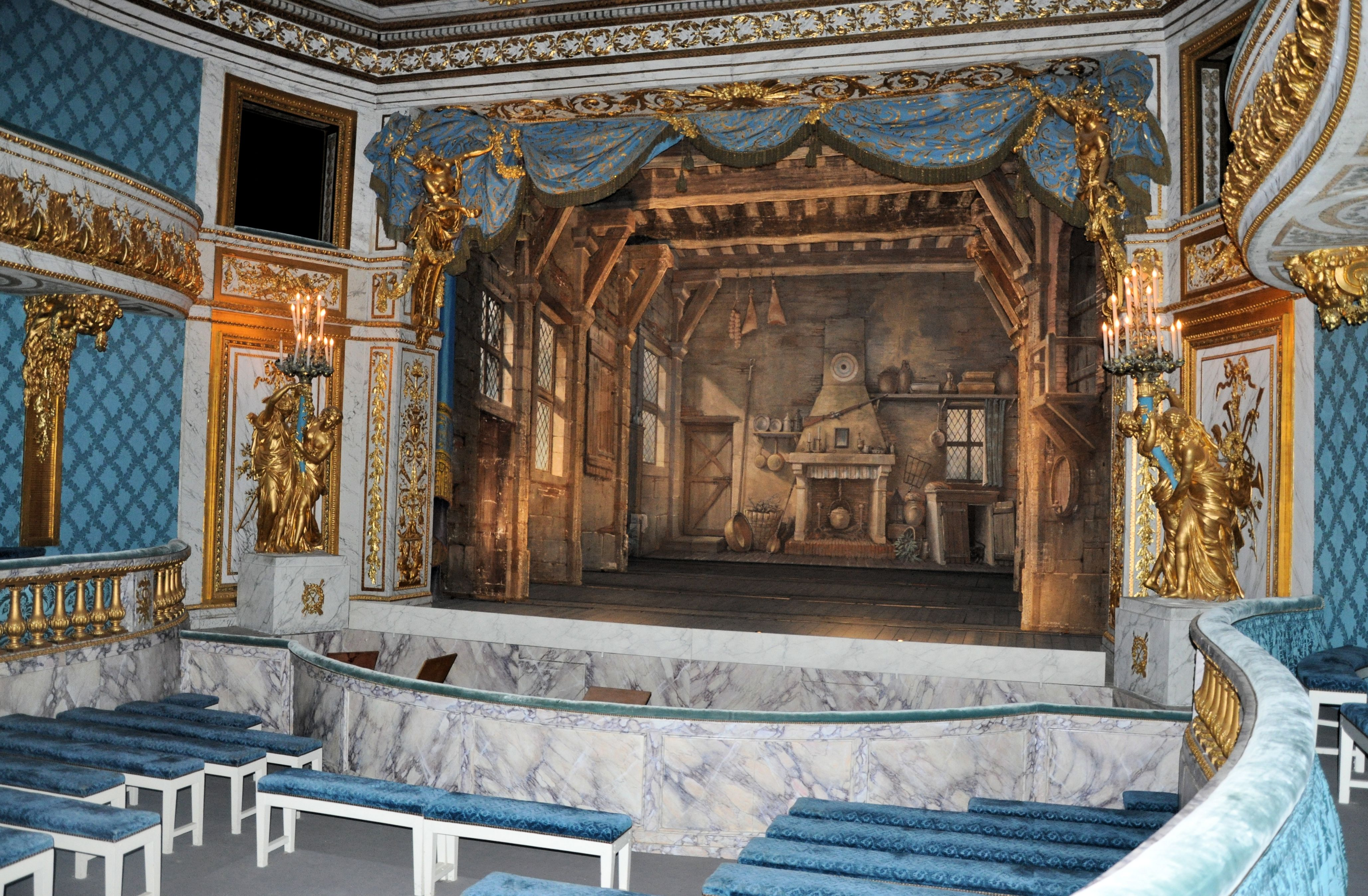
The Queen's Theatre

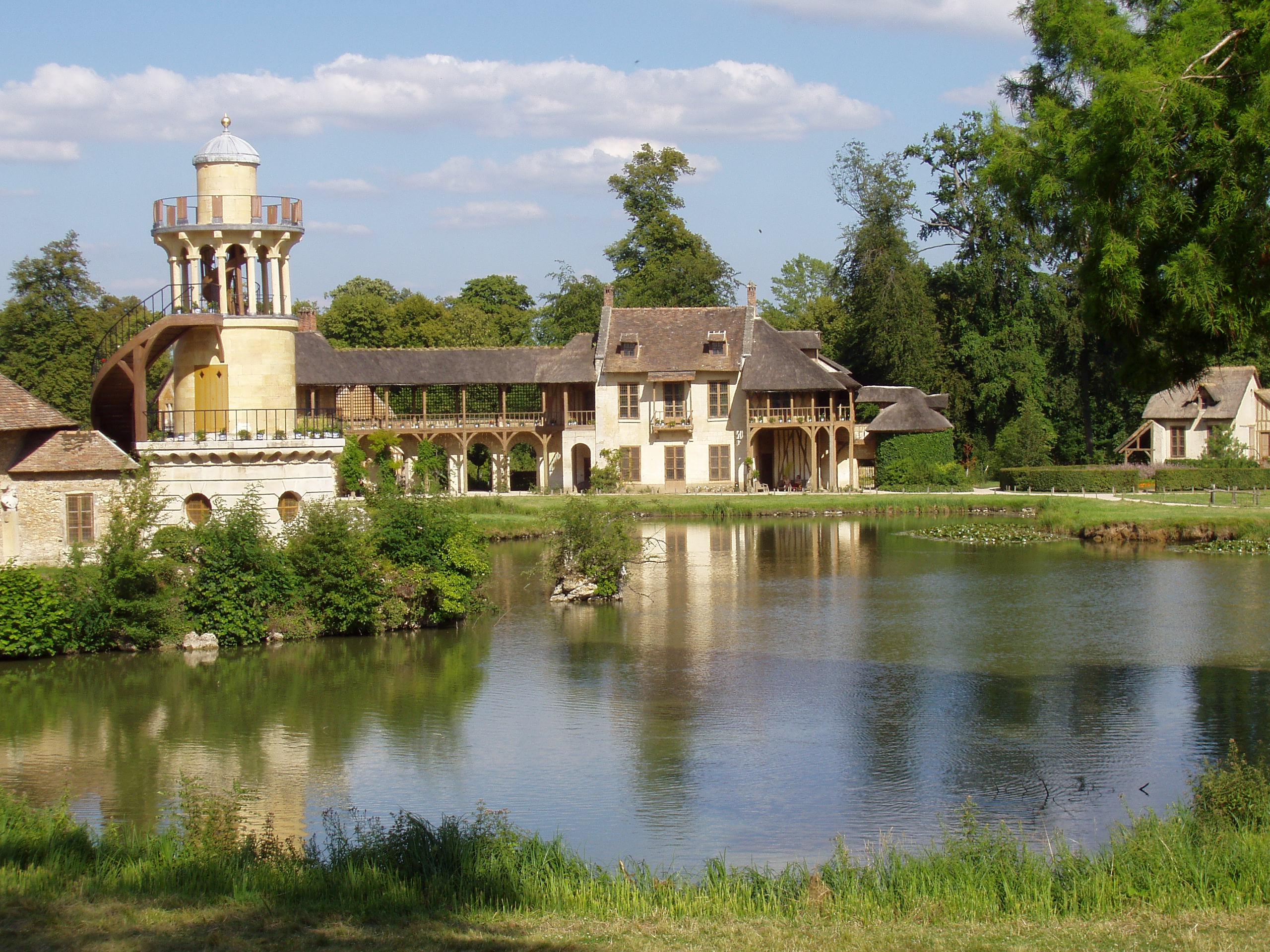
The Queen's Hamlet

Near the Trianons are the French pavilion, built by Gabriel in 1750 between the two residences, and the Queen's Theatre and Queen's Hamlet, built by architect Richard Mique in 1780 and from 1783 to 1785 respectively. These were both built at the behest of Marie Antoinette; the theatre, hidden in the gardens, indulged her appreciation of opera and is absolutely original, and the hamlet to extend her gardens with rustic amenities. The building scheme of the Queen's Hamlet includes a farmhouse (the farm was to produce milk and eggs for the queen), a dairy, a dovecote, a boudoir, a barn that burned down during the French Revolution, a mill and a tower in the form of a lighthouse.

== Modern political and ceremonial functions ==
The palace still serves political functions. Heads of state are regaled in the Hall of Mirrors; the bicameral French Parliament—consisting of the Senate (Sénat) and the National Assembly (Assemblée nationale)—meet in joint session (a congress of the French Parliament) in Versailles to revise or otherwise amend the French Constitution, a tradition that came into effect with the promulgation of the 1875 Constitution. For example, the Parliament met in joint session at Versailles to pass constitutional amendments in June 1999 (for domestic applicability of International Criminal Court decisions and for gender equality in candidate lists), in January 2000 (ratifying the Treaty of Amsterdam), in March 2003 (specifying the "decentralized organization" of the French Republic), and in March 2024 (to enshrine the freedom of women to have recourse to abortion).

In 2009, President Nicolas Sarkozy addressed the Great Recession before a congress in Versailles, the first time that this had been done since 1848, when Louis Napoleon Bonaparte gave an address before the French Second Republic. Following the November 2015 Paris attacks, President François Hollande gave a speech before a rare joint session of parliament at the Palace of Versailles. This was the third time since 1848 that a French president addressed a joint session of the French Parliament at Versailles. The president of the National Assembly has an official apartment at the Palace of Versailles. In 2023 a state visit by Charles III to France included a state banquet at the Palace.

== Gallery ==
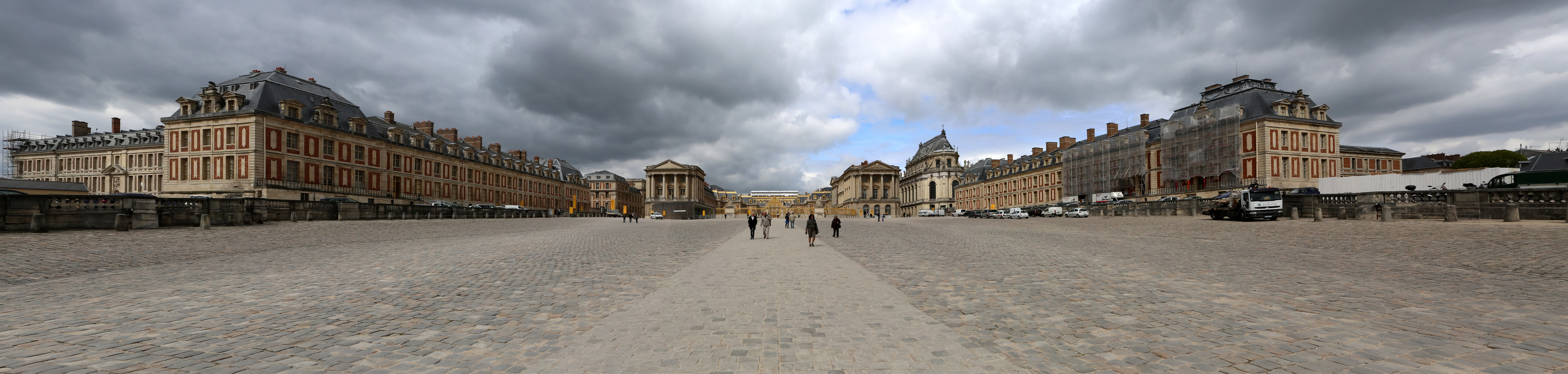
Panoramic view from the city

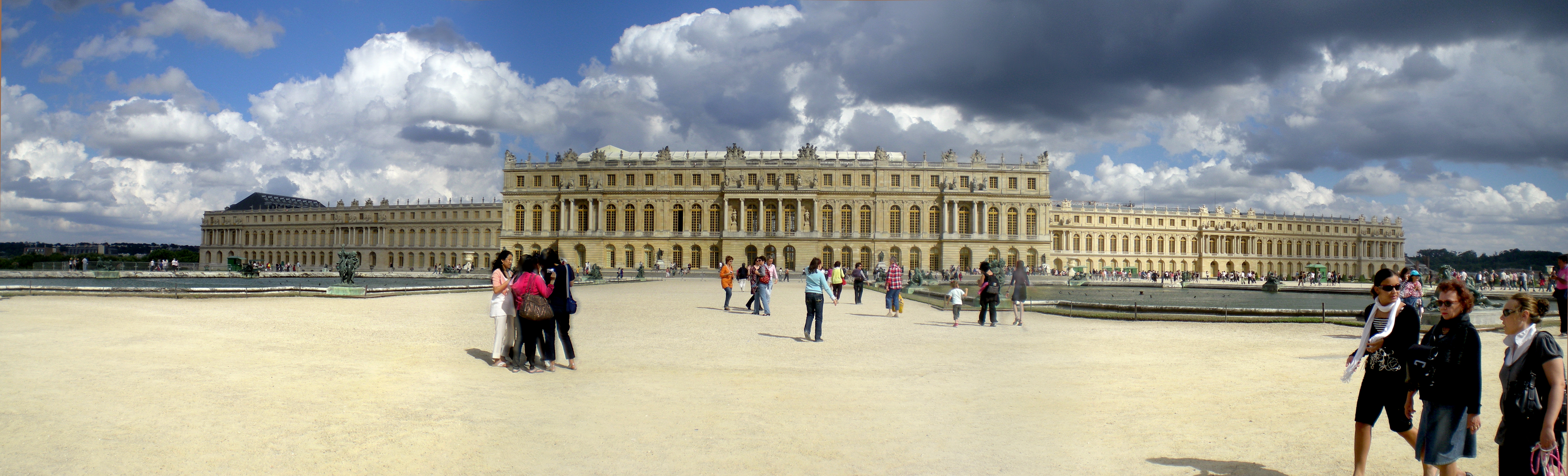
Panoramic view from the park

Central façade facing the Royal Court

== See also ==
- Bureau du Roi
- Fresh pavilion
- List of Baroque residences
- List of tourist attractions in Paris
- Louis XIV style
- Paris Peace Conference, 1919
- Potager du roi, Versailles (Kitchen Garden of the King)
- Tennis Court Oath (French: serment du jeu de paume) in the Saint-Louis district
- Versailles Cathedral
- Éléphante de Louis XIV

== Citations ==
=== References ===
- Ayers, Andrew (2004). The Architecture of Paris: An Architectural Guide. Edition Axel Menges. ISBN 9783930698967.
- Baghdiantz-MacCabe, Ina (2008). Orientalism in Early Modern France: Eurasian Trade, Exoticism, and the Ancien Régime. Berg Publishers. ISBN 9781847884633.
- Berger, Robert W. (1985). Versailles: The Château of Louis XIV. Penn State University Press. ISBN 0-271-00412-6.
- Berger, Robert W. (1994). A Royal Passion: Louis XIV as Patron of Architecture. Cambridge University Press. ISBN 0-521-44029-7.
- Blanning, T. C. W. (2002). The Culture of Power and the Power of Culture: Old Regime Europe 1660–1789. Oxford University Press. doi:10.1093/acprof:oso/9780198227458.001.0001. ISBN 978-0-1982-2745-8.
- Blondel, Jacque-François (1752–1756). Architecture françoise, ou Recueil des plans, élévations, coupes et profils des églises, maisons royales, palais, hôtels & édifices les plus considérables de Paris. Vol. 4 vols. Paris: Charles-Antoine Jombert.
- Bohanan, Donna (2001). Crown and Nobility in Early Modern France. European History in Perspective. Palgrave Macmillan. ISBN 978-0-333-71694-6.
- Bonney, Richard (June 2007). "Vindication of the Fronde? The cost of Louis XIV's Versailles building programme". French History. 21 (2). Oxford University Press: 205–22. doi:10.1093/fh/crm004.
- Doyle, William, ed. (2001). Old Regime France. Short Oxford History of France. Oxford University Press. ISBN 0-19-873129-9.
  - Swann, Julian. "The State and Political Culture". Old Regime France. pp. 139–68.
  - Doyle, William. "Politics: Louis XIV". Old Regime France. pp. 169–94.
  - Swann, Julian. "Politics: Louis XV". Old Regime France. pp. 195–222.
- Garrigues, Dominique (2001). Jardins et jardiniers de Versailles au grand siècle. Seyssel: Champ Vallon. ISBN 9782876733374.
- Hoog, Simone (1996). "Versailles". In Turner, Jane (ed.). The Dictionary of Art. Vol. 32. New York: Grove. pp. 369–374. ISBN 9781884446009. Also at Oxford Art Online (subscription required).
- Jones, Colin (2018). Versailles. Basic Books. ISBN 978-1-5416-7338-0.
- Kaufmann, Thomas DaCosta (1995). Court, Cloister, and City: The Art and Culture of Central Europe, 1450–1800. University of Chicago Press. ISBN 978-0-226-42729-4.
- Kemp, Gerard van der (1976). "Remeubler Versailles". Revue du Louvre. 3: 135–137.
- Lacaille, Frédéric (2012). Versailles – 400 ans d'histoire. Paris: Gallimard. ISBN 978-2-07-044430-4.
- Michelin Tyre PLC (1989). Île-de-France: The Region Around Paris. Harrow [England]: Michelin Tyre Public Ltd. Co. ISBN 9782060134116.
- Nolhac, Pierre de (1898). La création de Versailles sous Louis Quinze. Paris: H. Champion.
- Pérouse de Montclos, Jean-Marie (1991). Versailles. Abbeville Press. ISBN 9781558592285.
- Saule, Béatrix; Meyer, Daniel (2000). Versailles Visitor's Guide. Versailles: Éditions Art-Lys. ISBN 9782854951172.
- Saule, Béatrix (2013). Versailles. Editions ArtLys.
- Spawforth, Antony (2008). Versailles: A Biography of a Palace. St. Martin's Press. ISBN 978-0-312-35785-6.
- Walton, Guy (1986). Louis XIV's Versailles. University of Chicago Press. ISBN 978-0-2268-7254-4.
- Yerkes, Carolyn (Winter 2015). "The Grand Escalier at the Château de Versailles: The Monumental Staircase and its Edges". The Princeton University Library Chronicle. 76 (1–2). Princeton University Library: 51–83. doi:10.25290/prinunivlibrchro.76.1-2.0051. JSTOR 10.25290/prinunivlibrchro.76.1-2.0051.

=== Web sources ===
- "Histoire de Versailles" (in French). City of Versailles. Archived from the original on 15 August 2022.
- "Palace and Park of Versailles". UNESCO.

==== French Ministry of Culture ====
- "Château royal de Marly". Base Mérimée (in French). Ministry of Culture.
- "Domaine national de Marly". Base Mérimée (in French). Ministry of Culture.
- "The History". en.chateauversailles.fr. Public Establishment of the Palace, Museum and National Estate of Versailles. 27 March 2016.
- "Versailles, "capital" of the kingdom, 1682". en.chateauversailles.fr. Public Establishment of the Palace, Museum and National Estate of Versailles. 22 November 2016.
- "Reception of the Doge of Genoa, 1685". en.chateauversailles.fr. Public Establishment of the Palace, Museum and National Estate of Versailles. 22 November 2016.
- "Reception of the Ambassador of Siam, 1686". en.chateauversailles.fr. Public Establishment of the Palace, Museum and National Estate of Versailles. 22 November 2016.
- "Reception of the Ambassadors of Persia, 1715". en.chateauversailles.fr. Public Establishment of the Palace, Museum and National Estate of Versailles. 22 November 2016.
- "Death of Louis XIV". en.chateauversailles.fr. Public Establishment of the Palace, Museum and National Estate of Versailles. 23 November 2016.
- "André Le Nôtre". en.chateauversailles.fr. Public Establishment of the Palace, Museum and National Estate of Versailles. 2 November 2016.
- "Charles Le Brun". en.chateauversailles.fr. Public Establishment of the Palace, Museum and National Estate of Versailles. 2 November 2016.
- "The Estate". en.chateauversailles.fr. Public Establishment of the Palace, Museum and National Estate of Versailles. 2 September 2016.
- "The Royal Stables". en.chateauversailles.fr. Public Establishment of the Palace, Museum and National Estate of Versailles. 17 October 2016.
- "The Estate of Trianon". en.chateauversailles.fr. Public Establishment of the Palace, Museum and National Estate of Versailles. 17 October 2016.
- "The Grand Trianon". en.chateauversailles.fr. Public Establishment of the Palace, Museum and National Estate of Versailles. 23 November 2016.
- "The Petit Trianon". en.chateauversailles.fr. Public Establishment of the Palace, Museum and National Estate of Versailles. 23 November 2016.
- "The Queen's Hamlet". en.chateauversailles.fr. Public Establishment of the Palace, Museum and National Estate of Versailles. 26 April 2018.
- "The estate of Marly". en.chateauversailles.fr. Public Establishment of the Palace, Museum and National Estate of Versailles. 17 October 2016.
- "The Gardens". en.chateauversailles.fr. Public Establishment of the Palace, Museum and National Estate of Versailles. 17 October 2016.
- "The Orangery". en.chateauversailles.fr. Public Establishment of the Palace, Museum and National Estate of Versailles. 8 December 2016.
- "The Grand Commun". en.chateauversailles.fr. Public Establishment of the Palace, Museum and National Estate of Versailles. 2 August 2019.
- "The Royal Chapel". en.chateauversailles.fr. Public Establishment of the Palace, Museum and National Estate of Versailles. 24 October 2018.
- "The Royal Opera". en.chateauversailles.fr. Public Establishment of the Palace, Museum and National Estate of Versailles. 27 March 2016.
- "The Hall of Mirrors". en.chateauversailles.fr. Public Establishment of the Palace, Museum and National Estate of Versailles. 27 March 2016.
- "Revitalising the Royal Palace". en.chateauversailles.fr. Public Establishment of the Palace, Museum and National Estate of Versailles. 24 October 2018.
- Saule, Béatrix. "Ménagerie". sculpturesversailles.fr (in French). Public Establishment of the Palace, Museum and National Estate of Versailles.
- "1752: La destruction de l'escalier des Ambassadeurs". Versailles 3D (in French). Public Establishment of the Palace, Museum and National Estate of Versailles.
