= Belvédère (Petit Trianon) =

Neoclassical garden built 1778–1781 for Marie Antoinette

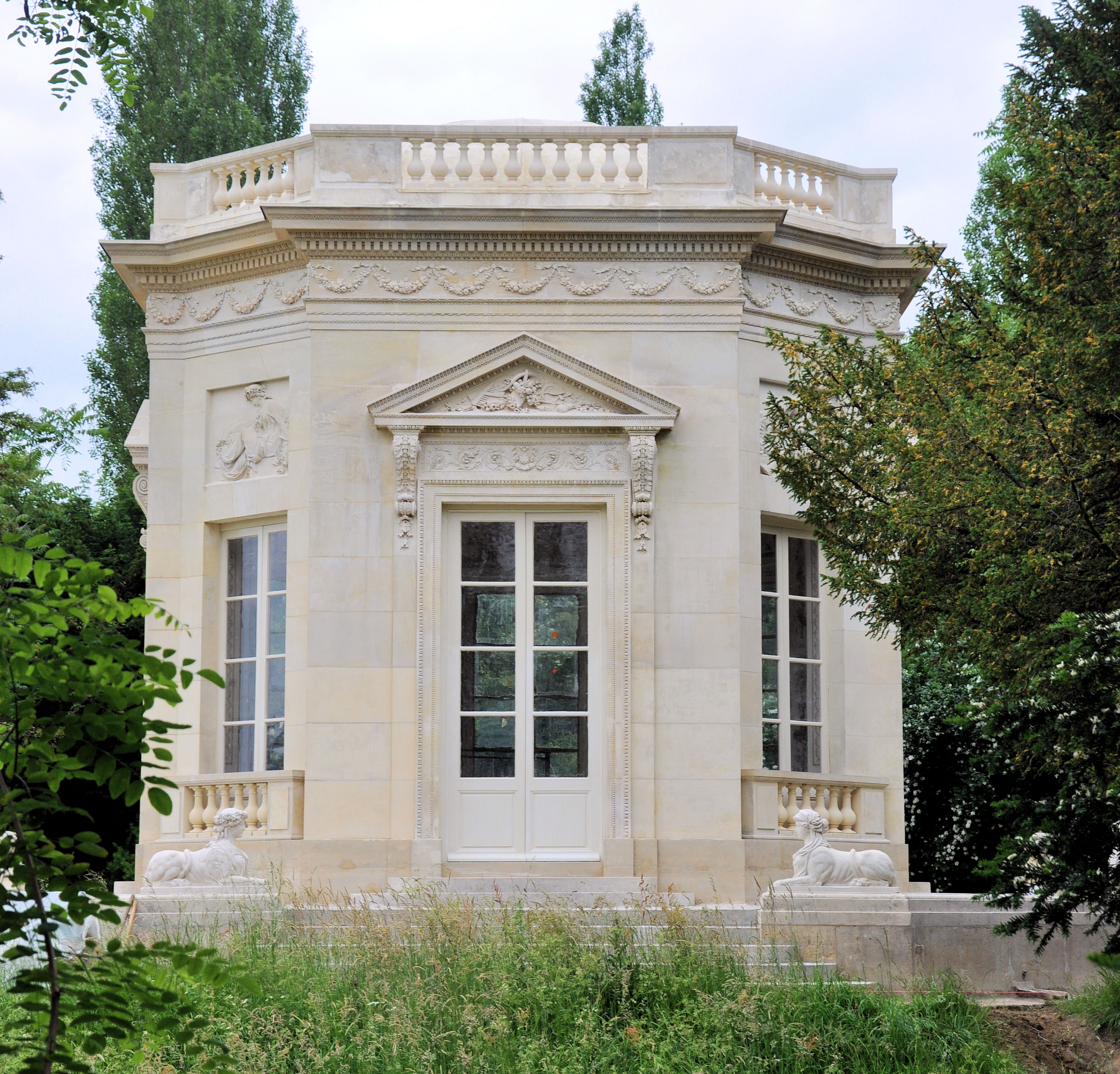
- Interactive map of Belvédère (Petit Trianon)
- Location: France
- Designer: Richard Mique
- Beginning date: 1778
- Completion date: 1781
- Website: http://www.chateauversailles.fr/decouvrir-domaine/domaine-marie-antoinette-/les-jardins-et-le-hameau/le-jardin-anglais-

The Belvédère du Petit Trianon, or Pavillon du Rocher, is a neoclassical garden built by Richard Mique between 1778 and 1781 for the French queen Marie Antoinette within the Jardin anglais du Petit Trianon on the grounds of the Château de Versailles.

A small octagonal pavilion, designed by the Queen's architect, is one of the features of the new garden of the Petit Trianon and serves as a music salon. It is flanked by an artificial rock from which a waterfall cascades and is surrounded by miniature mountains that form an alpine garden. It is guarded by eight stone sphinxes sculpted by Joseph Deschamps. Deschamps was also responsible for decorating the eight facades, whose bas-reliefs allegorize the four seasons and whose pediments are decorated with attributes of hunting and gardening. The interior salon is richly decorated with arabesques painted on stucco depicting scenes from nature, a marble floor, and a ceiling by Jean-Jacques Lagrenée depicting cherubs in a blue sky.

Despite two centuries of deterioration and alteration, the Belvédère du Petit Trianon and its rock were restored and brought back to their ancien régime condition in 2012. This extensive restoration, encompassing the Alpine Garden, restored the entire structure and is now listed as a historic monument, along with the Château de Versailles and its outbuildings. It is now open to the public as part of the Musée National des Châteaux de Versailles et de Trianon within the Domaine de Marie-Antoinette.

== Construction ==
Following the transfer of the Petit Trianon from King Louis XVI, Marie Antoinette sought to utilize her newly-acquired freedom to develop the estate following her vision and inspiration. To realize her vision of an Eden, she engaged the services of a new architect, Richard Mique, the painter Hubert Robert, and the gardeners appointed by Louis XV, Antoine, and Claude Richard. The jardin anglais (English Garden) was created with Jean-Jacques Rousseau's ideas of a return to nature in mind. It incorporates sudden changes of scenery characteristic of the countryside across the Channel and French intellectual and literary. The Belvédère, the only feature visible from the château, appears isolated due to its location. However, it blends into a rugged landscape from the other side of the small lake.

The Belvédère, the primary structure of the Alpine garden, is an essential component of the Anglo-Chinese garden that was thus created. It is one of a series of structures built by Richard Mique, who played a significant role in achieving the highest degree of refinement in the picturesque alliance of architecture and vegetation. Central to the composition of the English garden, it was designed in the neoclassical style to maintain harmony with Ange-Jacques Gabriel's château and preserve its sober elegance.

The pavilion, a symbol of grandeur and architectural finesse, was constructed between March 1778 and May 1781. Five different models were developed to achieve the desired elegance of proportions, and the final design cost over 65,000 livres. This investment demonstrates the pavilion's importance in the garden's design.

== Description ==
=== Design of the exterior ===
This octagonal pavilion, with a lead dome concealed by a fence, is situated on a knoll overlooking the small lake. Its location was designed to afford a comprehensive overview of the Jardin anglais. However, as the surrounding vegetation grew less controlled and nature reclaimed its rights over time, this effect diminished, reducing the original perspective.

The exterior architecture is octagonal, while the interior is circular. The pavilion is on an octagonal stone plinth, with access via four steps guarded by sphinxes. Joseph Deschamps completed these in 1778 using a four-foot-long Conflans stone. The statues, known as the "guardians of harmony," are topped with attributes symbolizing the seasons. (Note: Spring: Braided hair, crown of flowers, and fringed draperies. Summer: Egyptian-style headdress with ears of corn and tassel cover. Autumn: Headdress with grapevines and bunches of grapes on the shoulder. Winter: Antique-style drape on the head.) Following extensive damage during the French Revolution and the 19th century, these statues were restored or copied in Tercé stone. Four originals are currently preserved in the reserves.

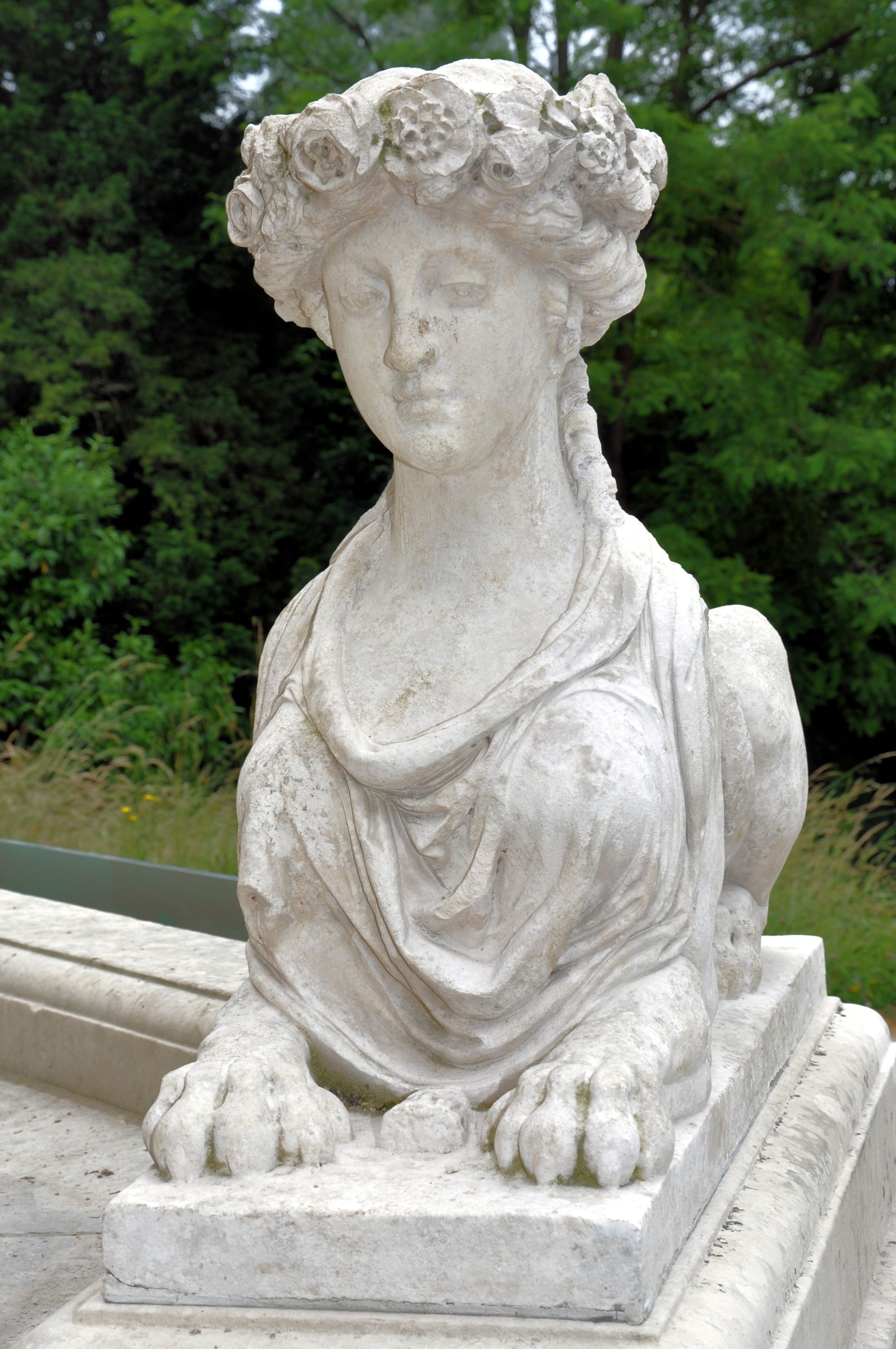
Sphinx depicting spring

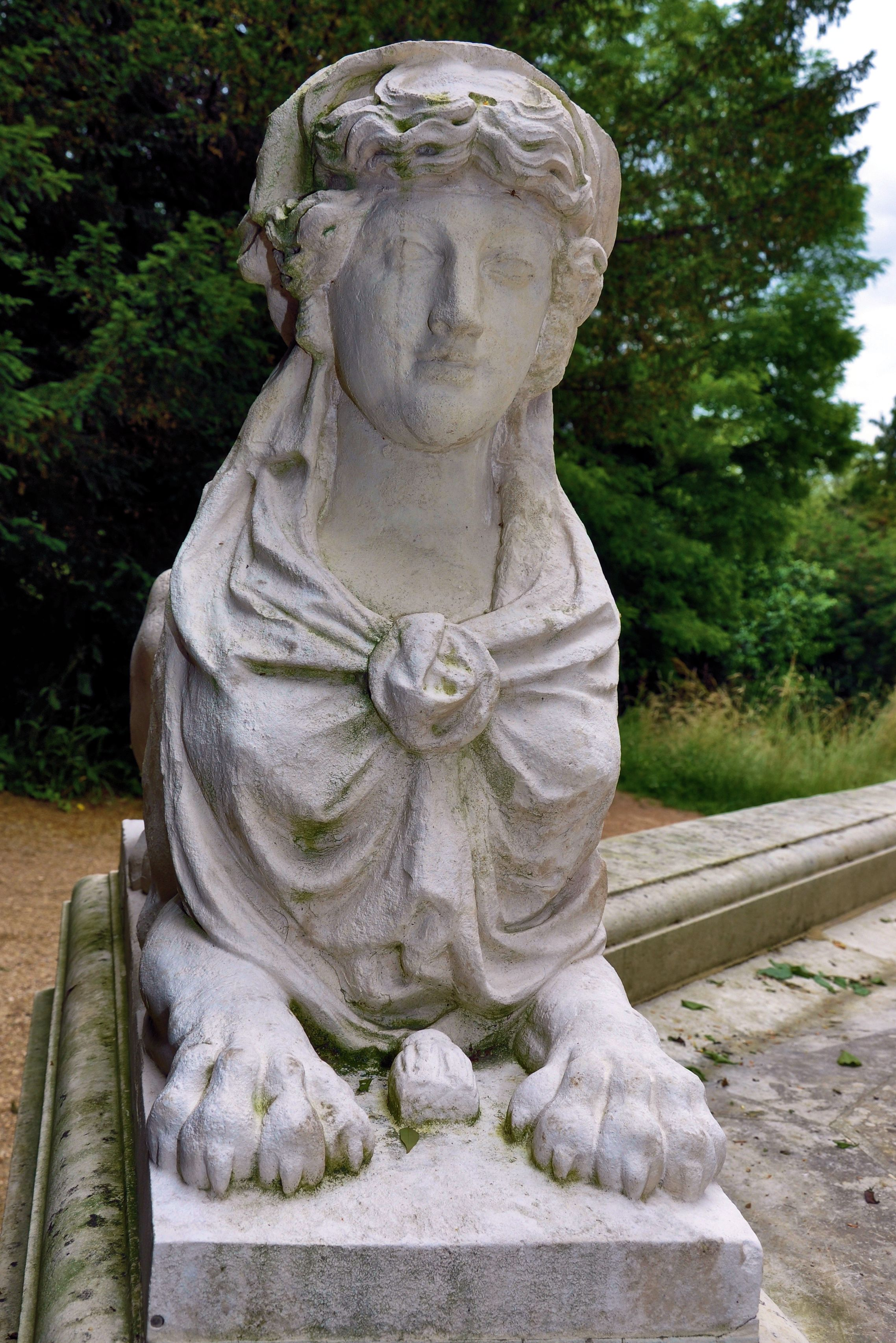
Sphinx depicting summer

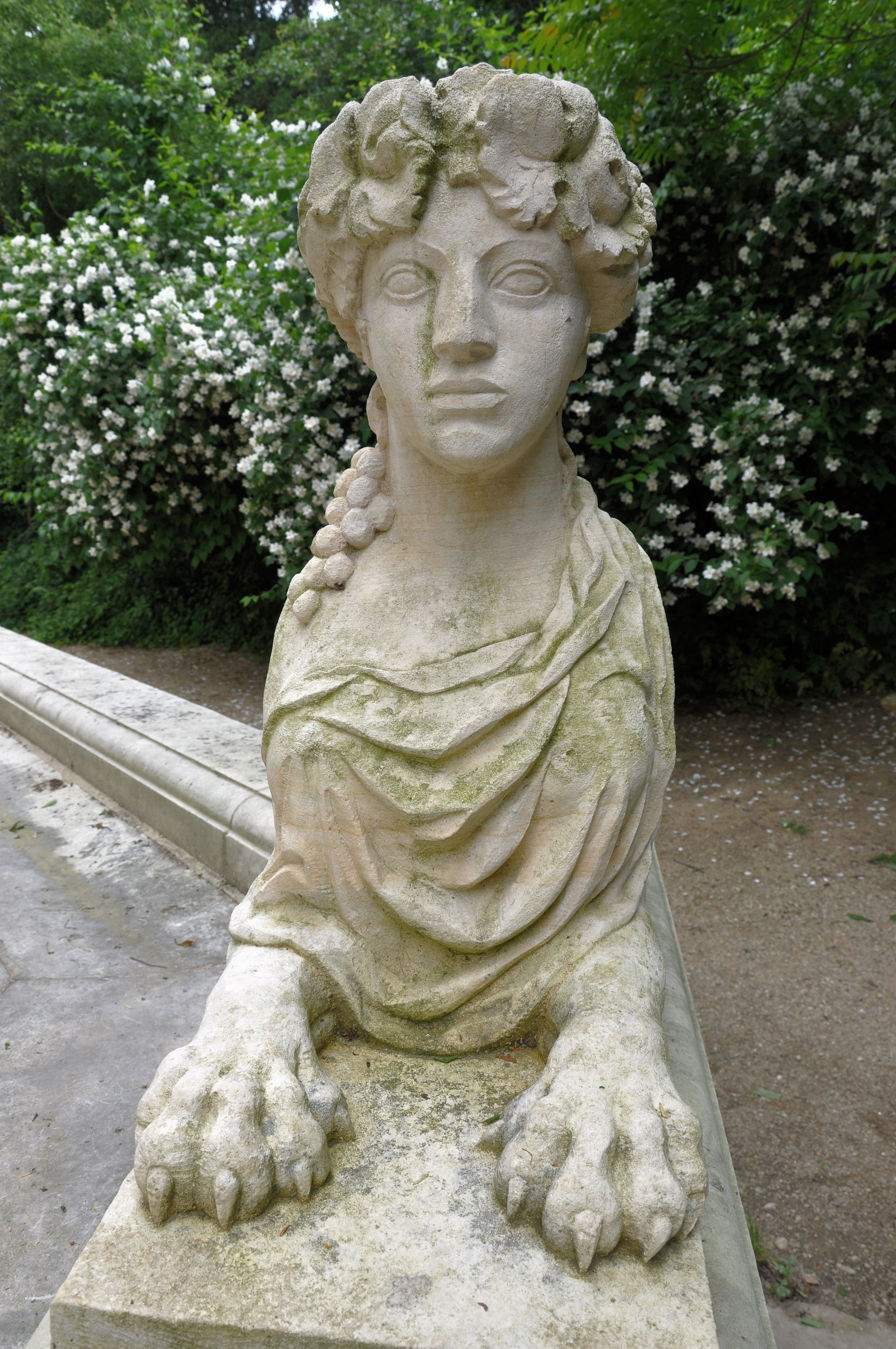
Sphinx depicting autumn

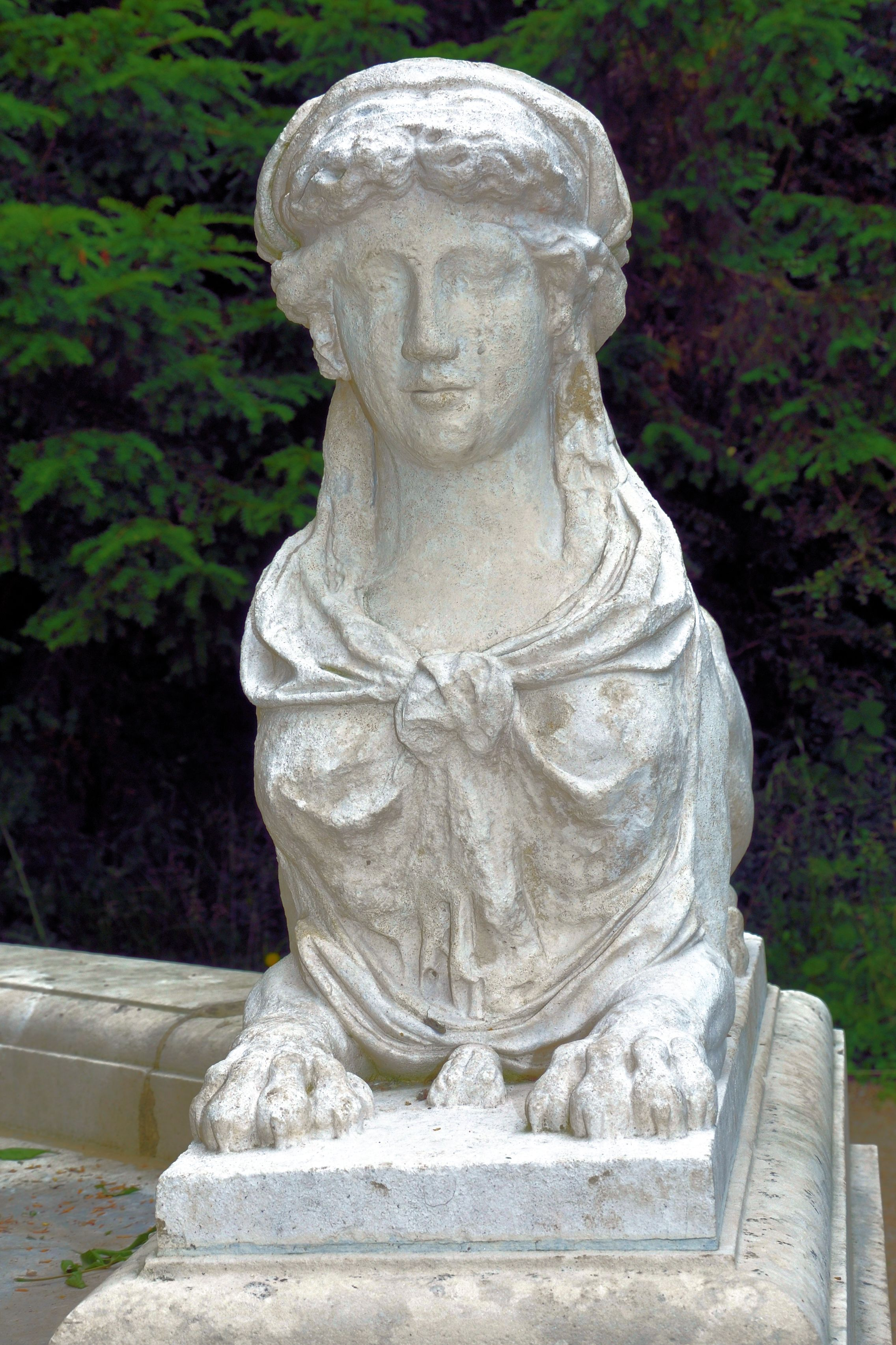
Sphinx depicting winter

The building's eight facades feature four doors and four alternating windows. The sculptural decoration was also the work of Joseph Deschamps, assisted by the young Pierre Cartellier. (Note: Pierre Cartellier (1757–1831) was a French sculptor and decorator who, at the start of his career, worked as an assistant to Deschamps.) The pediments above the doors, which initially featured groups of children, were finally adorned with attributes of hunting and gardening. (Note: The image features a dog standing still in front of ducks, a wreath of roses, a hunting scene with two tied-up partridges, a shotgun, and a hunting horn, and a basket filled with flowers and fruit.) A frieze of ornate fleurons and acanthus leaf scrolls encircles them. The bas-reliefs above the crosspieces depict seated figures in profile, symbolizing the four seasons. (Note: Flora was presented with roses to symbolize the arrival of spring. Ceres was honored with ears of wheat, a traditional symbol of summer. Bacchus was adorned with a vine, a common motif for autumn. Finally, Saturn was depicted as an older man warming himself by the fire to represent the winter season.) The building features a long entablature frieze consisting of a lead floral garland once painted in color and set in stone.

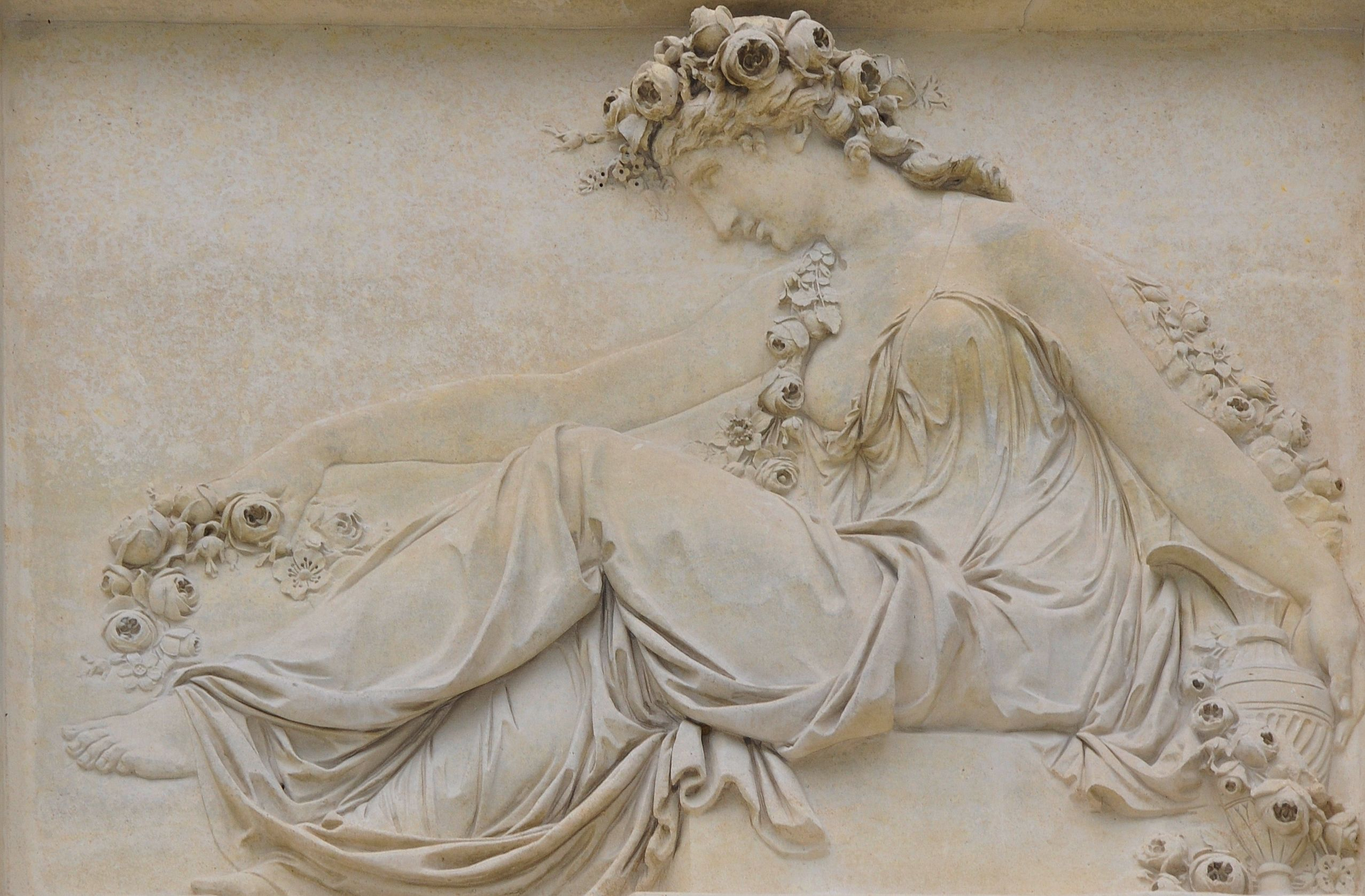
Flora crowned with roses.

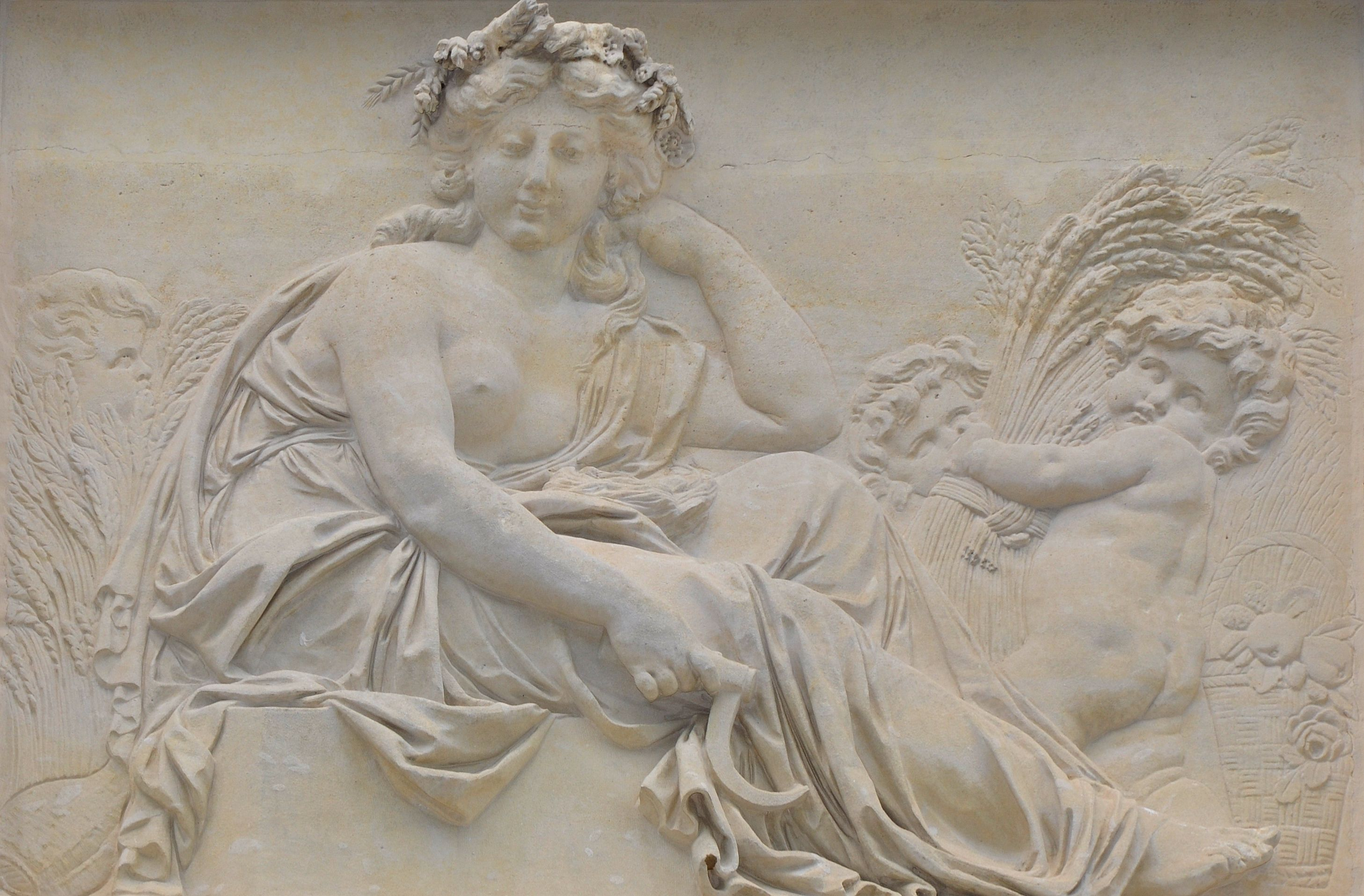
Ceres crowned with ears of wheat.

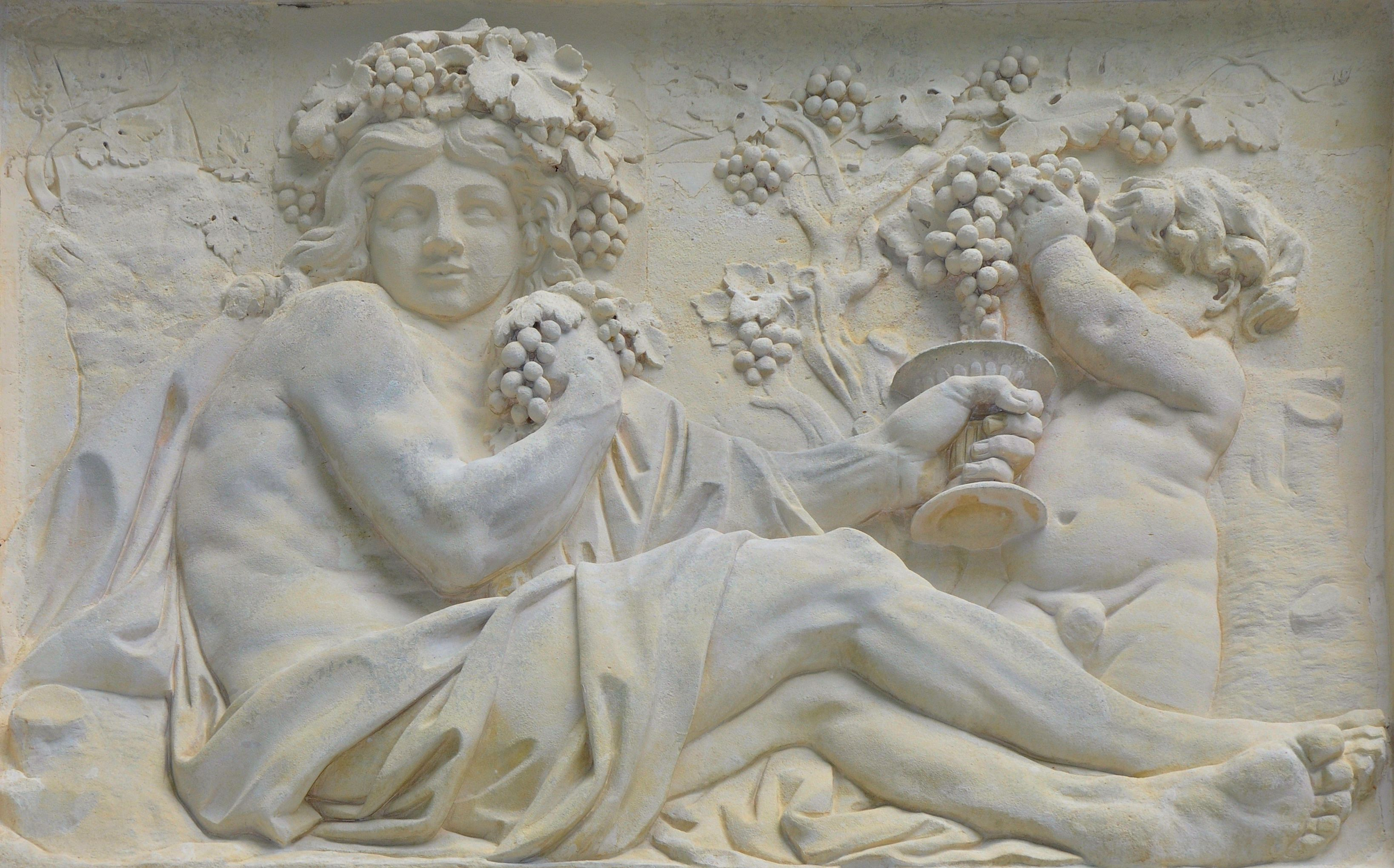
Bacchus crowned with a vine.

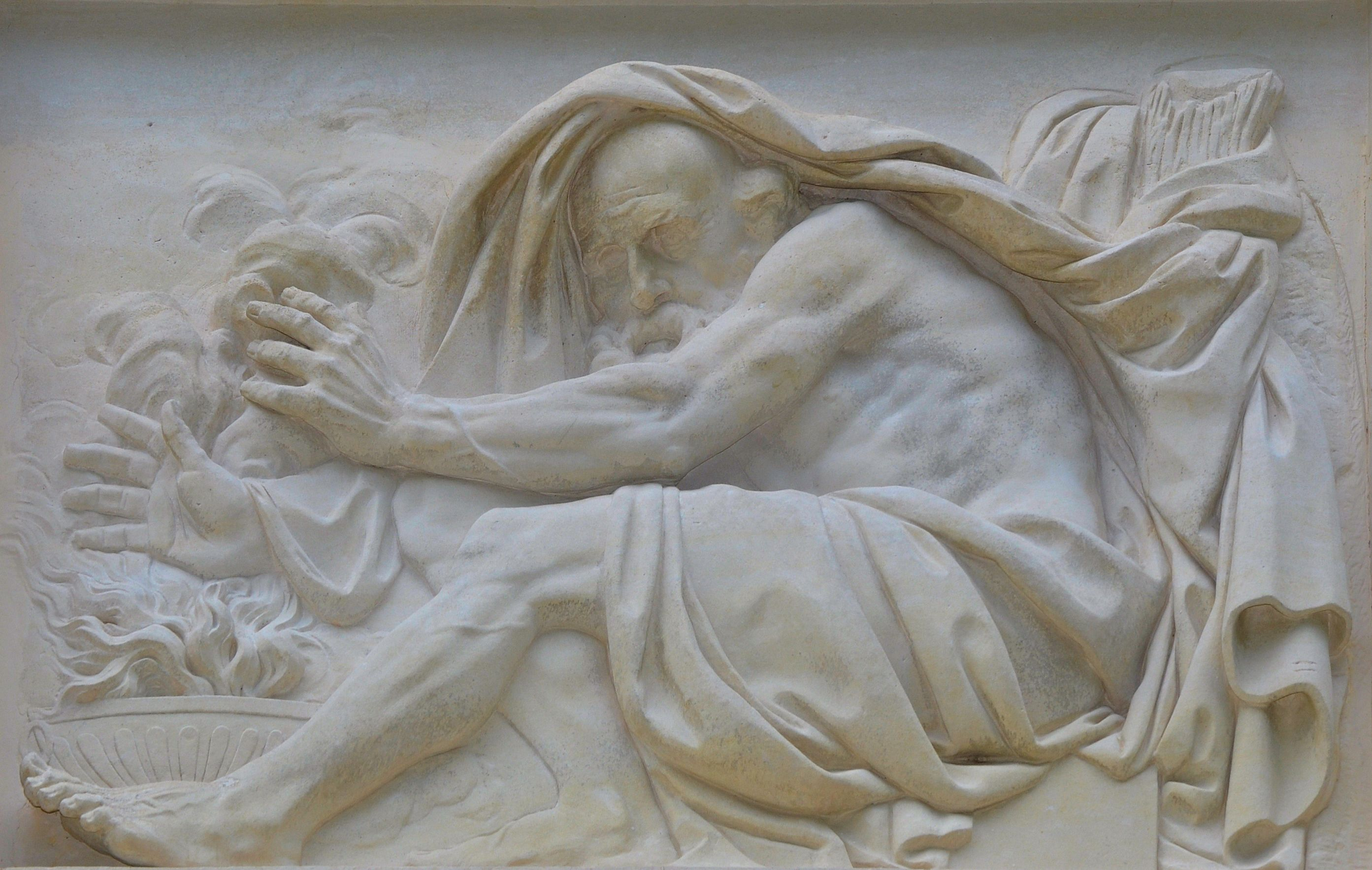
Saturn as an older man warming himself with fire.

=== Interior lounge ===
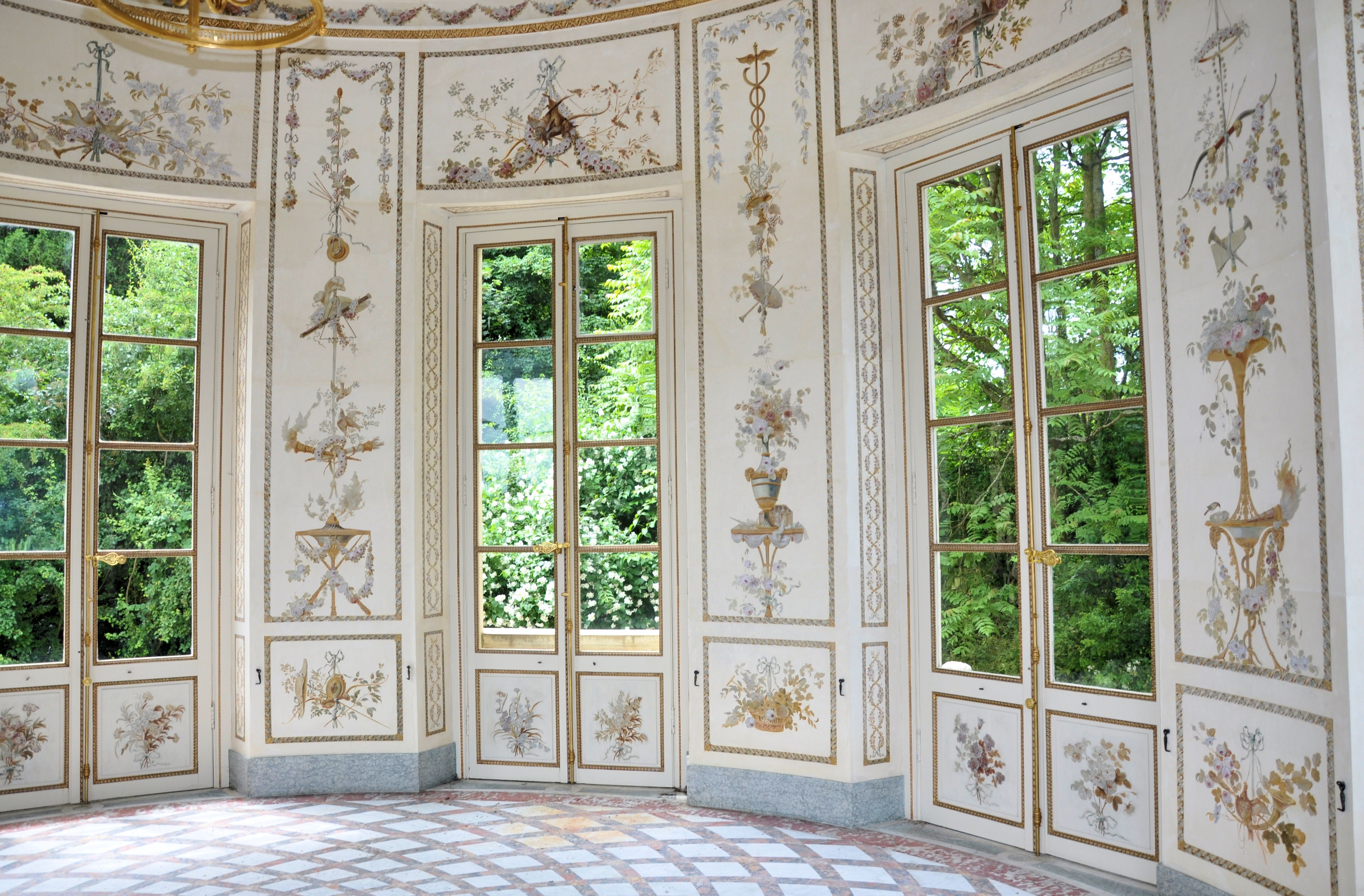
Belvedere lounge.

The pavilion features a luxurious circular salon. The interior walls are lined with stucco by Louis Mansiaux, known as Chevalier, the King's (Note: He was born in Ceintrey, Lorraine, and passed away in Auxerre on July 26, 1781. The Belvedere was his final project for the Palace of Versailles.) stucco artist, and painted with arabesques in oils by Sébastien-François Leriche. One of three selected designs presented to Marie-Antoinette features a multicolored palette enhanced with gold. The eight overmantels showcase a variety of trophies adorned with flowers. (Note: Desjardins provides a comprehensive overview that aligns with the 2012 restoration specifications. The collection includes musical instruments, gardening and fishing implements, torches, thyrses, caducei, quivers, open cages, baskets, and straw hats, accompanied by crossed daggers, hearts pierced by arrows, doves pecking at each other, and wreaths. In this instance, a medallion featuring a group of children on a black background is displayed, while in another area, the Austrian eagle is depicted with its wings outstretched. However, the lilies of France are absent from this scene. Tripods and tables hold either long vases in various shapes or incense burners. One of the items on display is a bottle of wine, a glass, and a plate of cookies. Other items include a veil, a fly swatter, and a fan. Another display features a monkey eating fish in a crystal basin while a squirrel nibbles fruit.)

The dome, painted by Jean-Jacques Lagrenée, (Note: He was paid 500 livres for this fresco. He also painted the ceiling of the Théâtre de la Reine in 1779.) depicts Amours dans un ciel bleu, playing with flowers amidst light clouds. The floor is paved with a turquoise-blue, green, veined white, and red marble mosaic, costing 4,839 livres. The design was inspired by 16th-century pavements, such as those by Vincenzo Scamozzi at the Marciana Library in Venice or Philibert Delorme at the chapel in Anet.

Marie-Antoinette used the small pavilion as a music salon. In 1781, eight armchairs and eight chairs with curved backs were delivered. Designed by François II Foliot after a model by the Garde-Meuble de la Couronne architect Jacques Gondouin, the chairs were upholstered in white and blue painted silk and trimmed with luxurious trimmings. During the Ancien Régime, the pavilion was only furnished when the Queen visited and only during summer.

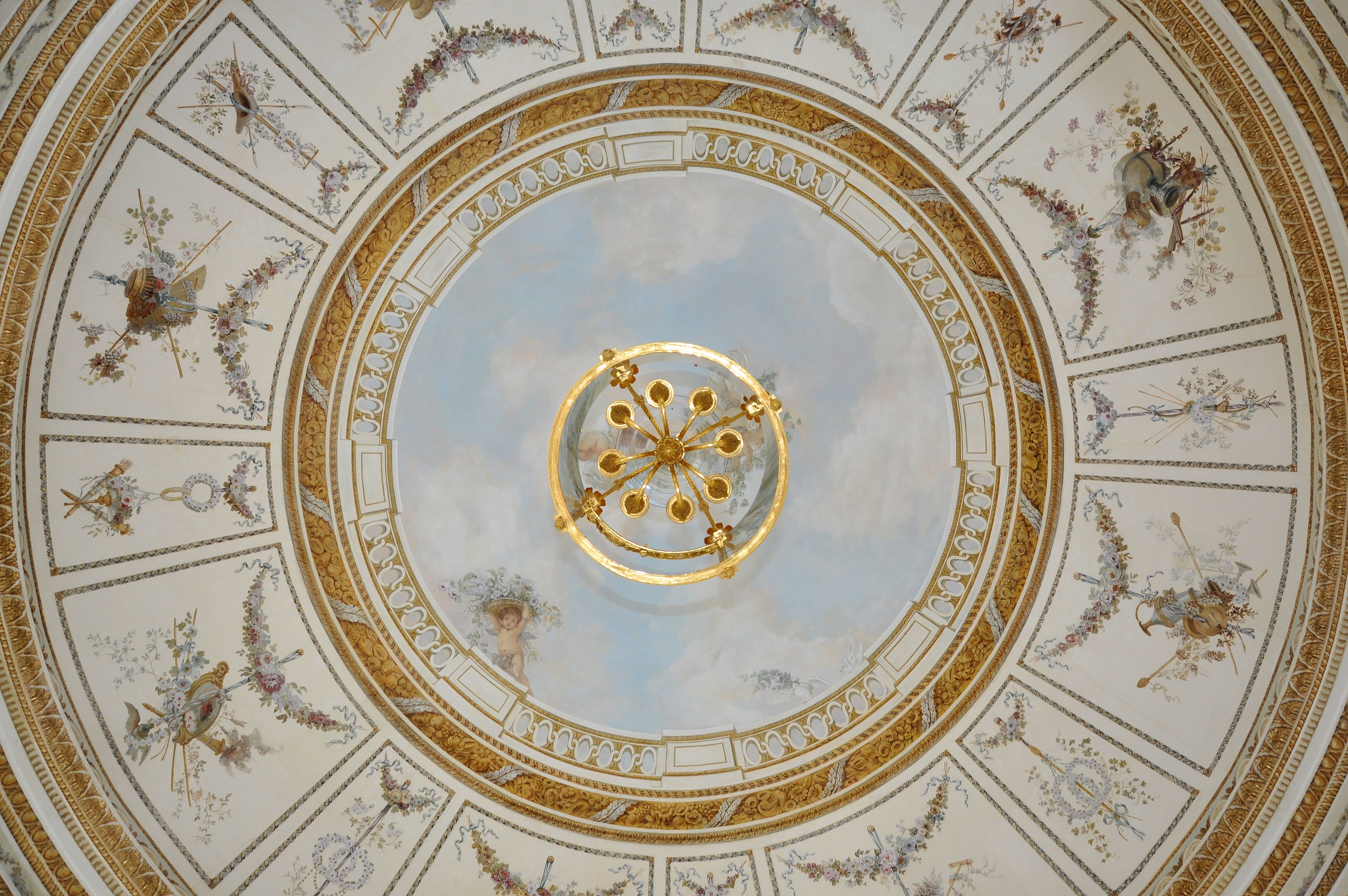
Ceiling by Jean-Jacques Lagrenée.

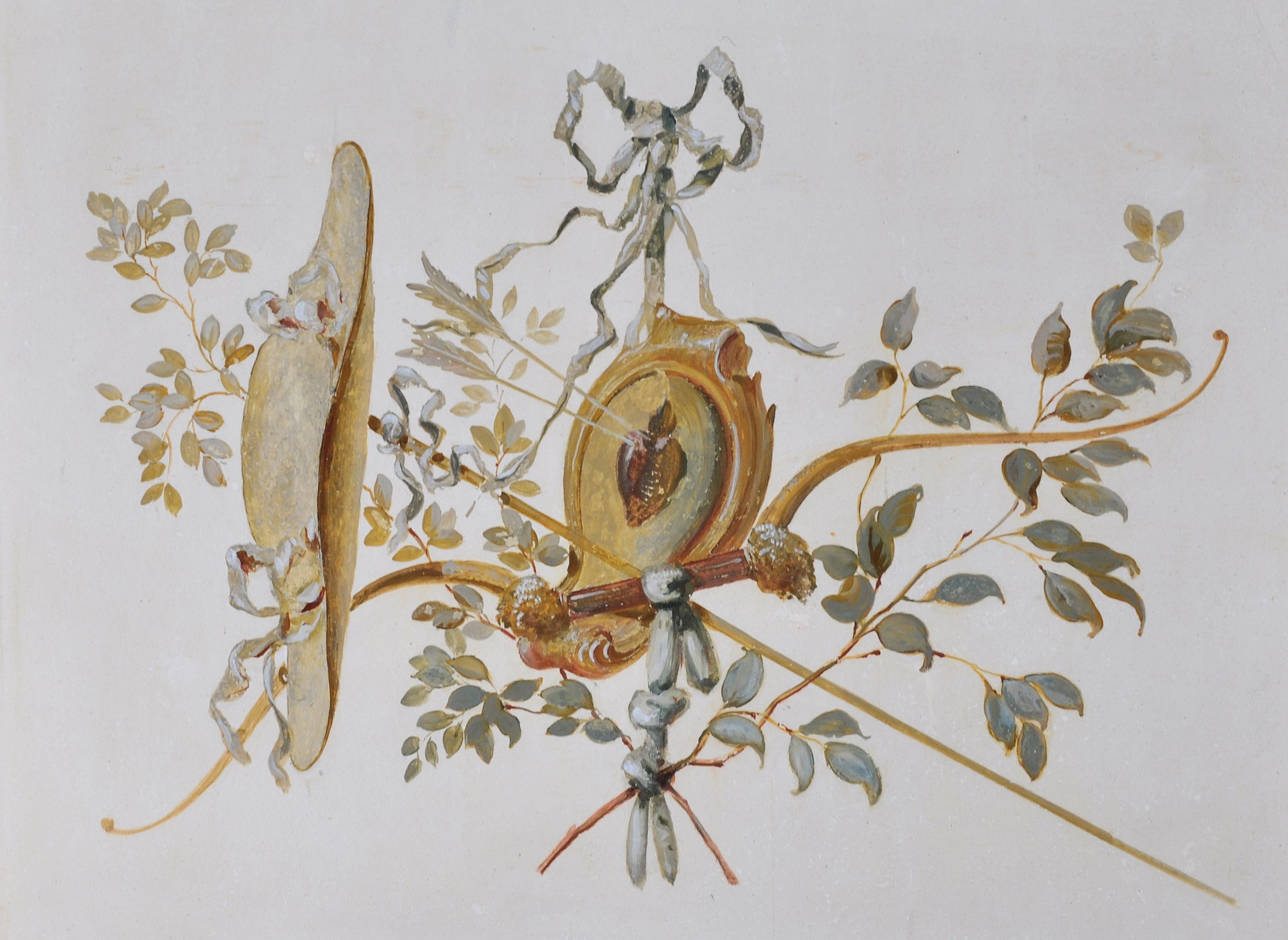
Arabesque by Sébastien-François Leriche (detail).

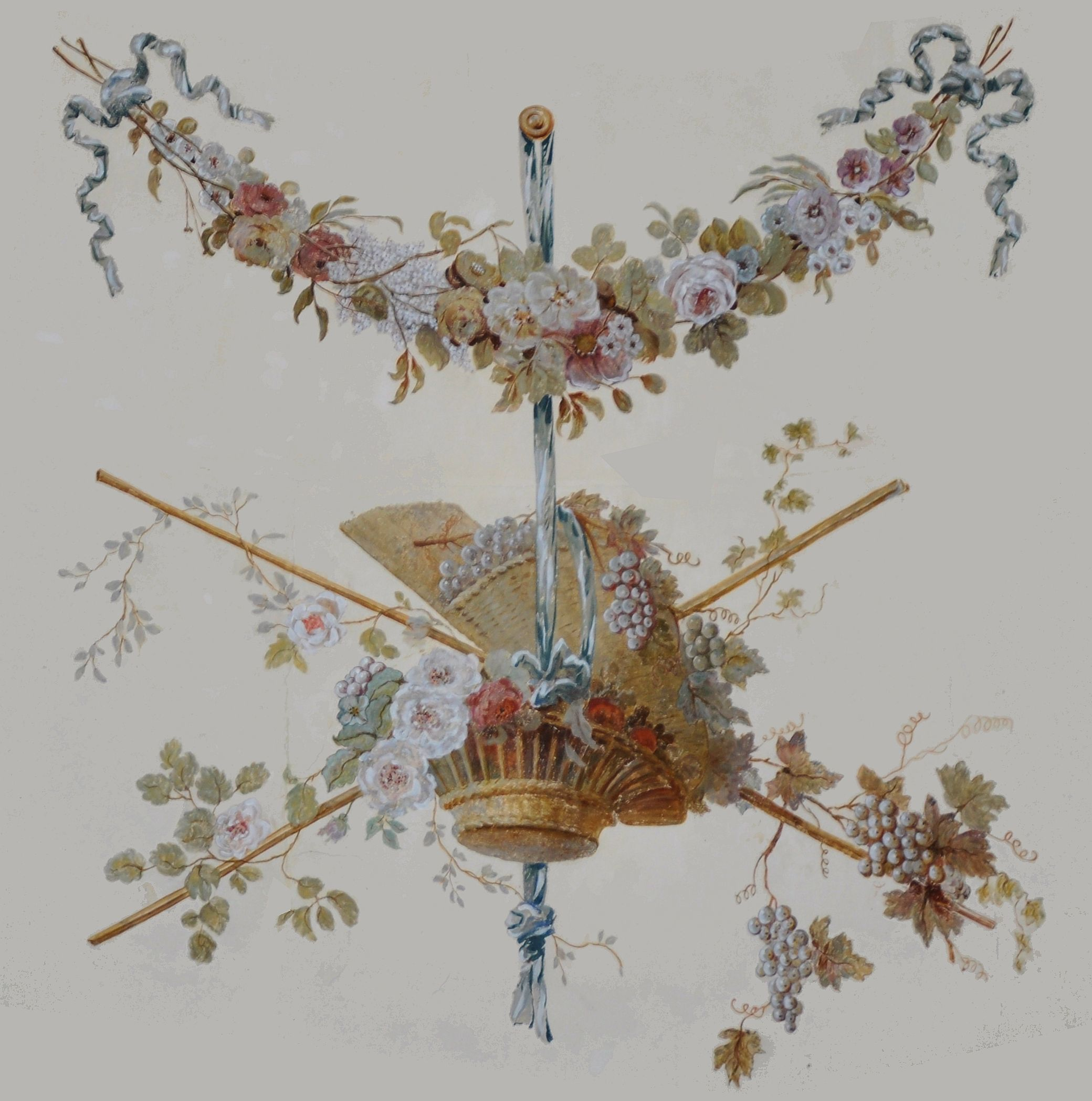
Arabesque by Sébastien-François Leriche (detail).

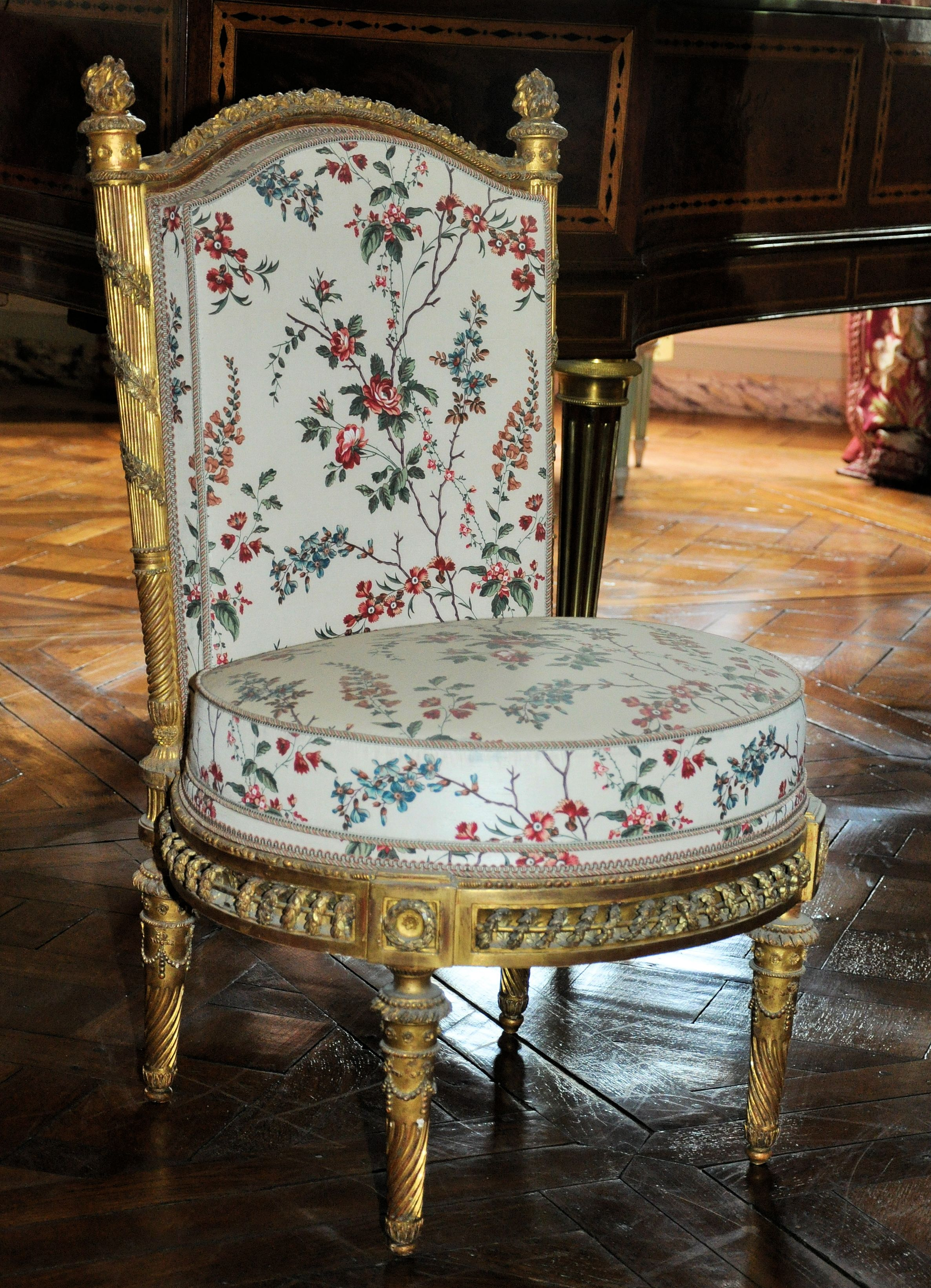
A chair intended for the Belvédère (Note: This unique chair is preserved in the salon de compagnie at the Petit Trianon château.)

== Grand rocher ==
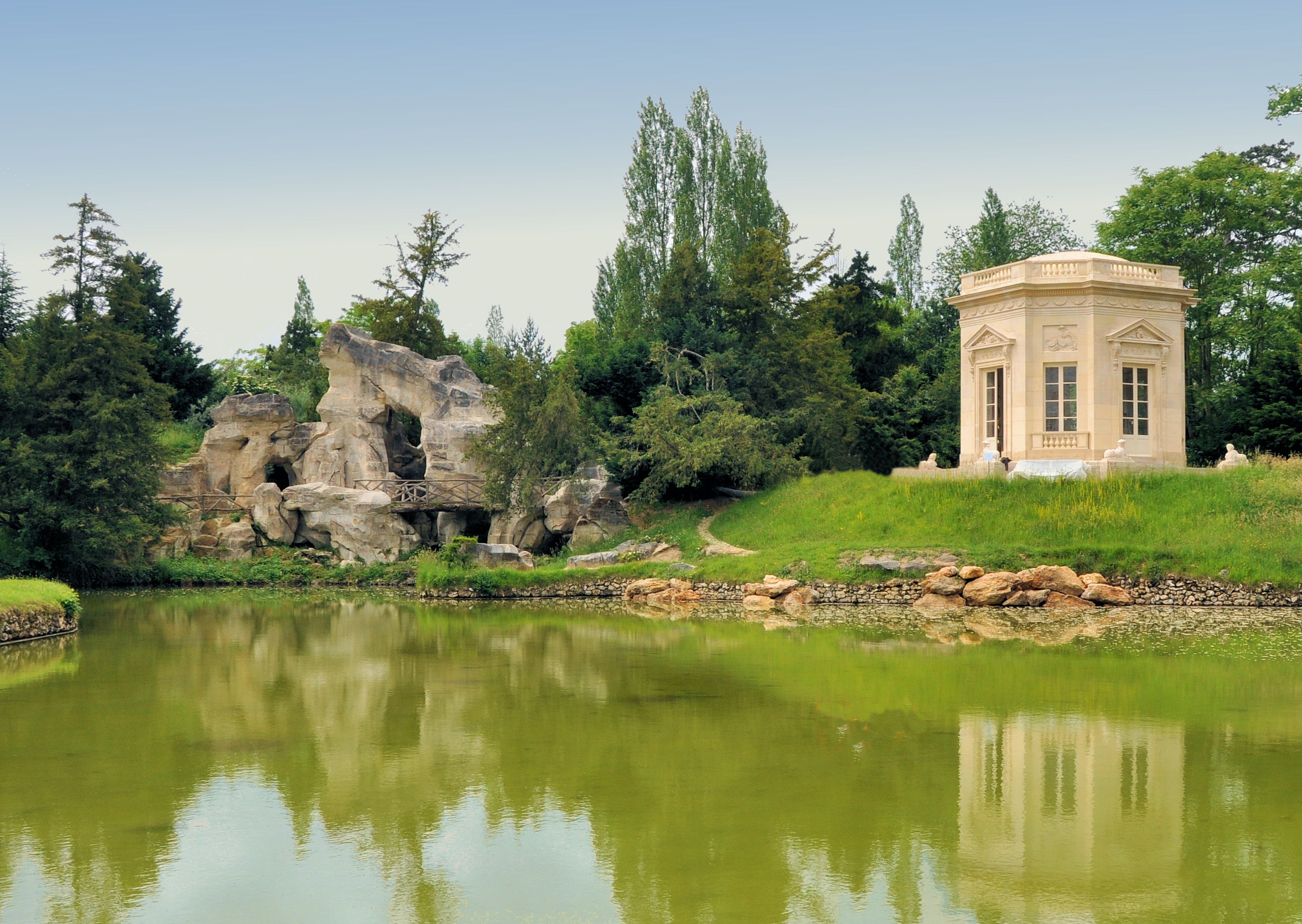
The Belvedere and the Grand Rocher by the lake.

The "Great Rock", which took four years to build, is the natural counterpart to the Belvédère. This artificial mountain, surrounded by conifers, is the source of the aquatic effect of this "Little Switzerland," sometimes also nicknamed the "Alpine Garden". The water flows in a torrent into the lake from a reservoir at the rear, fed by the Trèfle basin. A wooden footbridge, which may have been initially a columned pergola, allows visitors to stroll close to the waterfall. Crossing it is meant to evoke the terror, exaltation, and fortune of Rousseau crossing the mountains of Savoy.

The small lake flows into the winding river through the English garden, forming an island at the heart of the Temple de l'Amour. The river then splits into two arms, one ending in a ravine intended to conceal water discharge and located near the "green gate." (Note: The "Green Gate" is the gate on the right side of the entrance courtyard of the Petit Trianon.) During the Ancien Régime, the river was stocked with carp, perch, and barbel for the enjoyment of anglers. Nevertheless, the river also permitted boat and gondola trips despite regular silting and the frequent appearance of a whitish deposit on the surface. A landing stage provides convenient access to the mountains of the Alpine garden.

== Belvédère celebrations ==
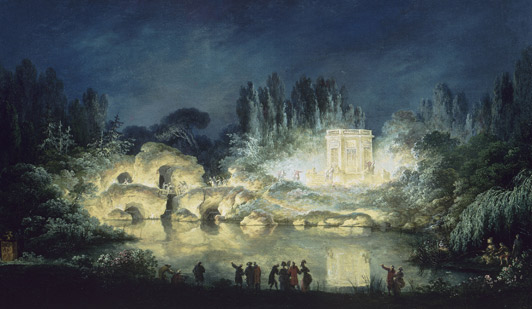
Illumination of the Belvedere and Rocher of the Petit Trianon in 1781 in honor of Austrian Emperor Joseph II. Claude-Louis Châtelet, 1781.

Marie-Antoinette used the small building as a music pavilion. Still, she also enjoyed breakfasting here, observing the awakening of nature in the myrtle, rose, and jasmine beds in spring. The Belvédère is the focal point of the landscape composition, attracting attention during celebrations organized by the Queen within the Trianon estate, situated just a few meters from the theater. One of the most notable examples is the subject of a painting by Claude-Louis Châtelet, which was presented on the occasion of the visit of her brother Joseph II in August 1781. This event occurred just a few days after the King's brother, Monsieur, was received. The guests were greeted by a rock illuminated and surrounded by transparent figures of piles of stones covered with foliage. All the Belvédère's protrusions were accentuated by strings of lights and lanterns concealed in tufts of fake reeds, which cast reflections on the lake.

== Restorations ==
Due to a lack of maintenance and attention from the Revolution onwards, the Belvédère and the rock began to decay without being the object of deliberate damage. The site was subsequently reclaimed by nature, with the growth of untidy vegetation eventually obscuring the original views. Nevertheless, a few restorations were undertaken at the end of the 19th century. These included the refurbishment of six new sphinges and the restoration of some of the facade ornamentation. However, the interior repainting during this century did not result in the original paintings being matched.

After a year of restoration work financed by patrons Vinci and the World Monument Fund to the tune of one million euros, the Belvédère and its rock were inaugurated on June 6, 2012. The structures have been reinforced, the sculptures and ashlars restored, the interior decorations fixed, harmonized, and protected, and the fountains restored to their original state.

== Bibliography ==
- Duvernois, Christian (2008). Trianon : le domaine privé de Marie-Antoinette (in French). Actes Sud. ISBN 978-2742778386.
- Desjardins, Gustave (1885). Le Petit Trianon : Histoire et description (in French). Versailles: L. Bernard.
- Rey, Léon (1936). Le Petit Trianon et le hameau de Marie-Antoinette (in French). FeniXX réédition numérique.
- Baulez, Christian (1996). Visite du Petit Trianon et du Hameau de la Reine : Versailles (in French). Paris: Éditions Art Lys. ISBN 9782854950786.
- Jacquet, Nicolas (2011). Versailles secret et insolite : Le château, ses jardins et la ville (in French). Paris: Parigramme. ISBN 978-2286075774.
- Jacquet, Nicolas (2013). Secrets et curiosités des jardins de Versailles : Les bosquets, le domaine de Trianon, le Grand parc (in French). Paris: Parigramme. ISBN 978-2840968146.
- Vinci; World Monuments Fund (2012). Inauguration du Belvédère de Trianon et de son rocher restauré (PDF) (in French).
- Le patrimoine des communes de France (2000). Le patrimoine des communes des Yvelines (in French). Vol. 2. Paris: Flohic. ISBN 2-84234-070-1.
- Arizzoli-Clémentel, Pierre (2008). L'Album de Marie-Antoinette : Vues et plans du Petit Trianon à Versailles (in French). Gourcuff Gradenigo. ISBN 978-2353400423.
- Lorenz Meyer, Friedrich Johann (1797). Fragmente aus Paris im IVten Jahr der Französischen Republik (in German). Karl Ernst Bohn.

== Related articles ==
- Petit Trianon
- Temple de l'Amour
