= Théâtre de la Reine =

Theatre in the park of Versailles, France

- Théâtre du Trianon
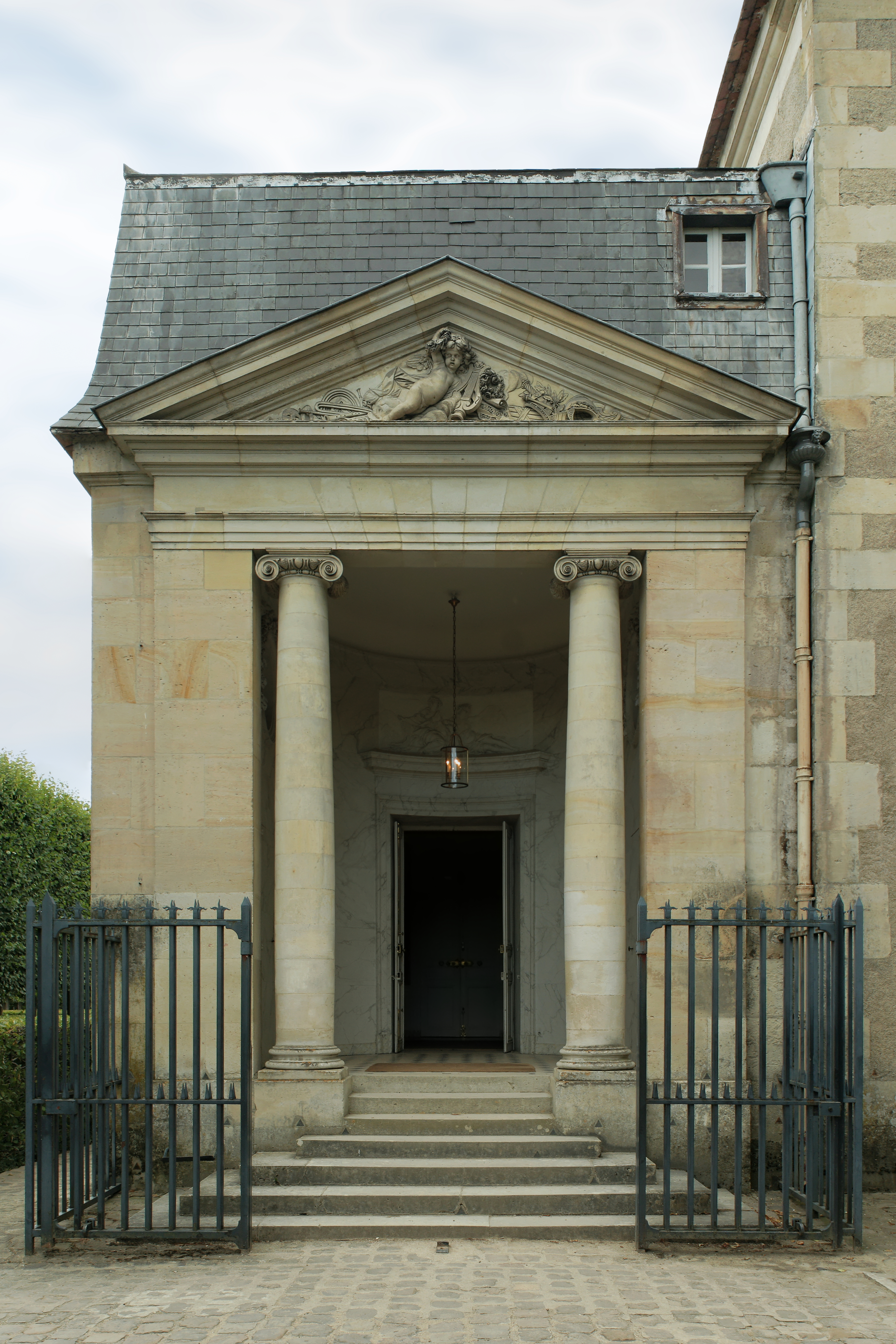
- Entrance of the theater
- Interactive map of Théâtre de la Reine
- Address: Petit Trianon, parc de Versailles; France
- Coordinates: 48°48′57″N 2°6′28″E
- Capacity: 250

Construction
- Opened: 1780
- Architect: Richard Mique

The Théâtre de la Reine (Queen's Theater) ou Théâtre du Trianon (Trianon Theater) is a theater built for Queen Marie-Antoinette by the architect Richard Mique from June 1778 to July 1779. It is located in the grounds of the Petit Trianon, in the park of the Palace of Versailles, hidden between the tree tunnel of the French Garden and the tall trees of the Alpine Garden. The exterior of the building, which looks like an outbuilding, contrasts with the sophisticated decoration of its interior, which is adorned with blue silk and velvet and gilded sculptures, yet is all pretense. It was inaugurated in 1780, ten years after the opening of the "Grand Théâtre", as the Royal Opera of Versailles was then called.

This small comedy hall was a secret place for the Queen, far from the court of Versailles and its torments. She herself came to play comedy, with a troupe reduced to her intimate entourage, in memory of her taste, since childhood, for theater and declamation. The authors in fashion were performed, some of them, such as Beaumarchais, were even forbidden at court. The stage, twice as large as the hall, as well as the machinery, complex and of the most modern, are the work of the machinist Boullet, of the Paris Opera.

The theater was spared during the French Revolution, as it was considered worthless. Several queens and empresses, Marie-Louise, Marie-Amélie and Eugénie, appropriated the place in the course of the 19th century, which became a sort of women's privilege. It has been assigned to the museum, but is rarely visited and, after several restoration campaigns, has remained intact to this day, including its machinery, an almost unique example of the eighteenth century.

== Gallery ==
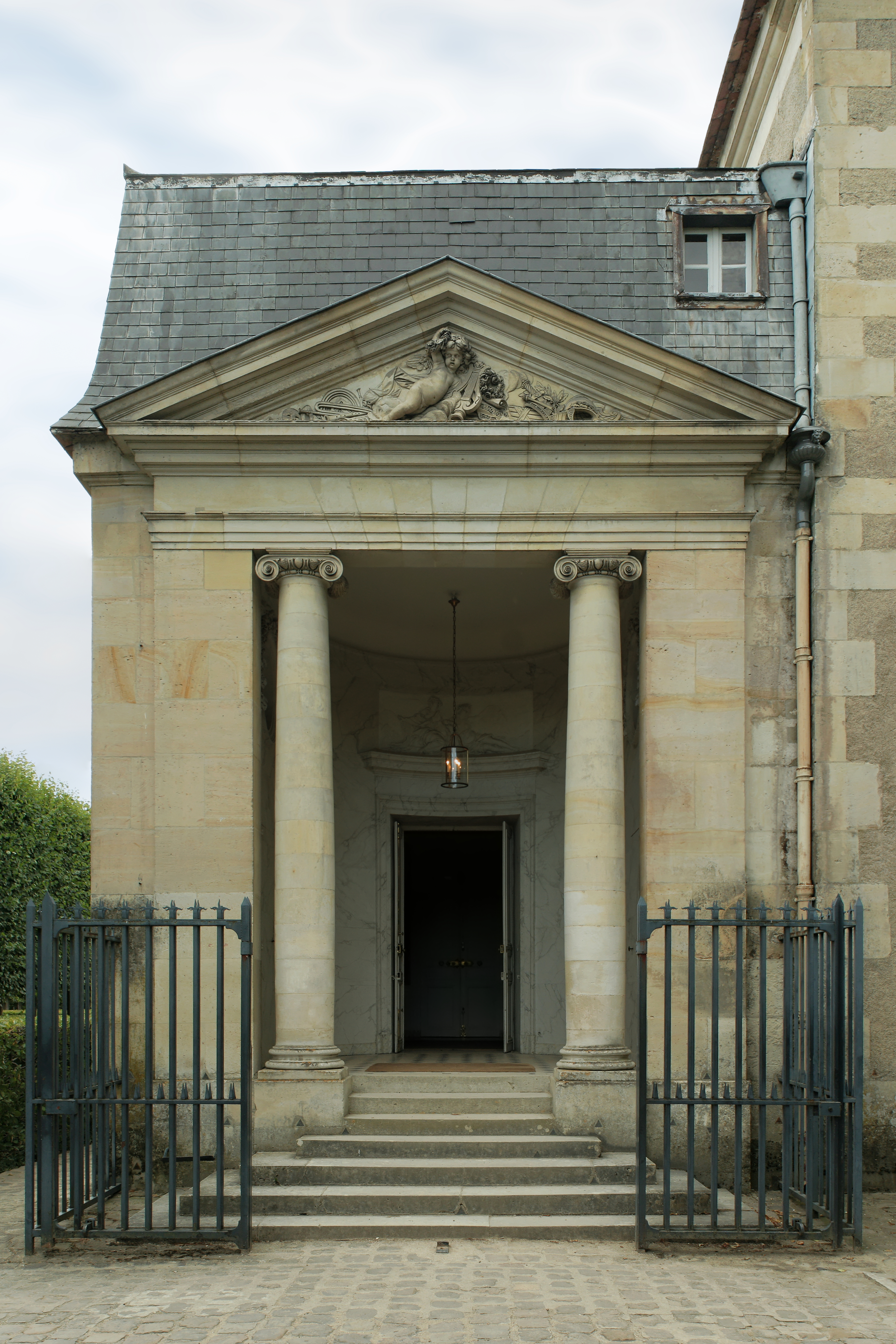
Entrance

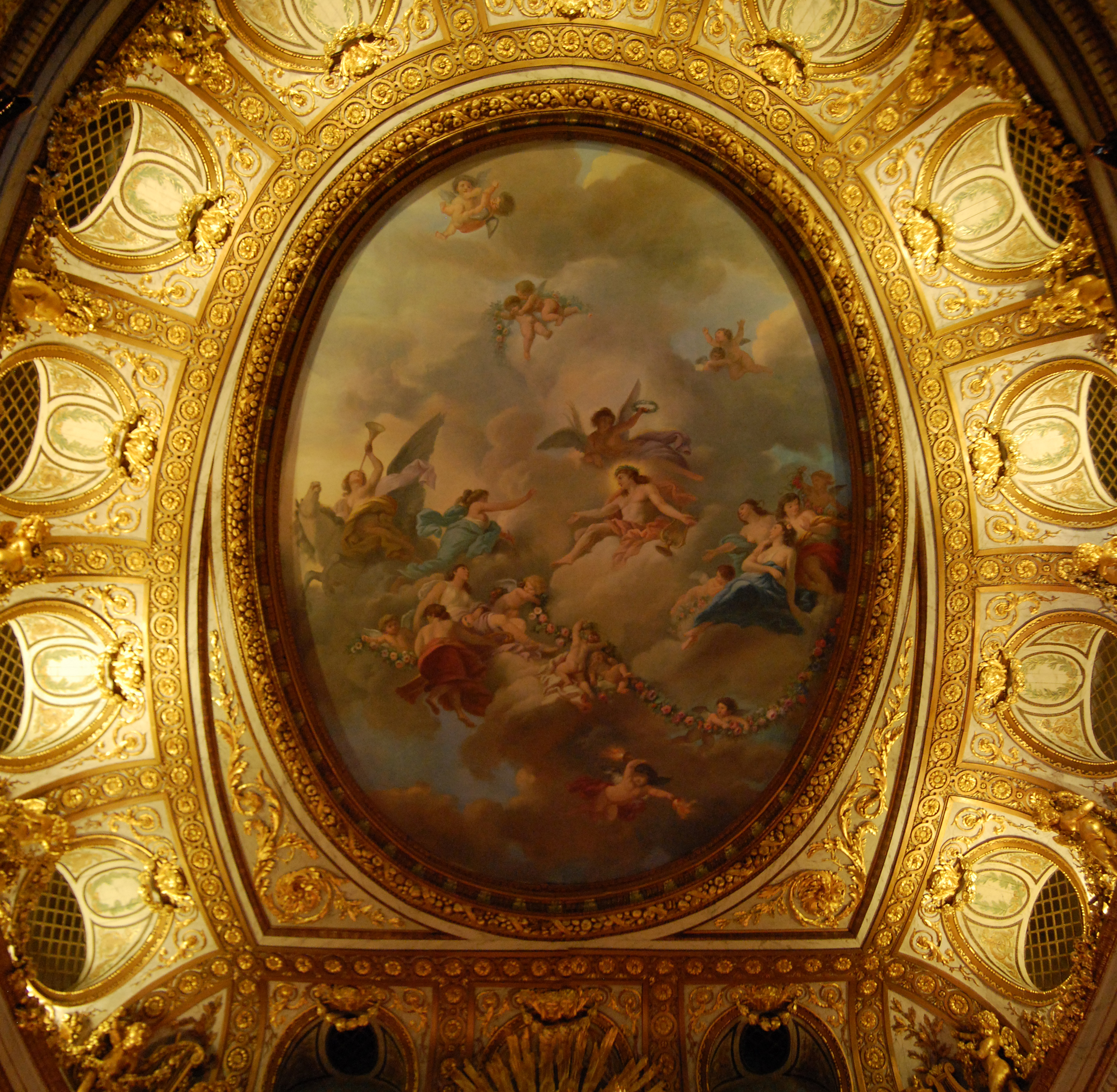
Ceiling

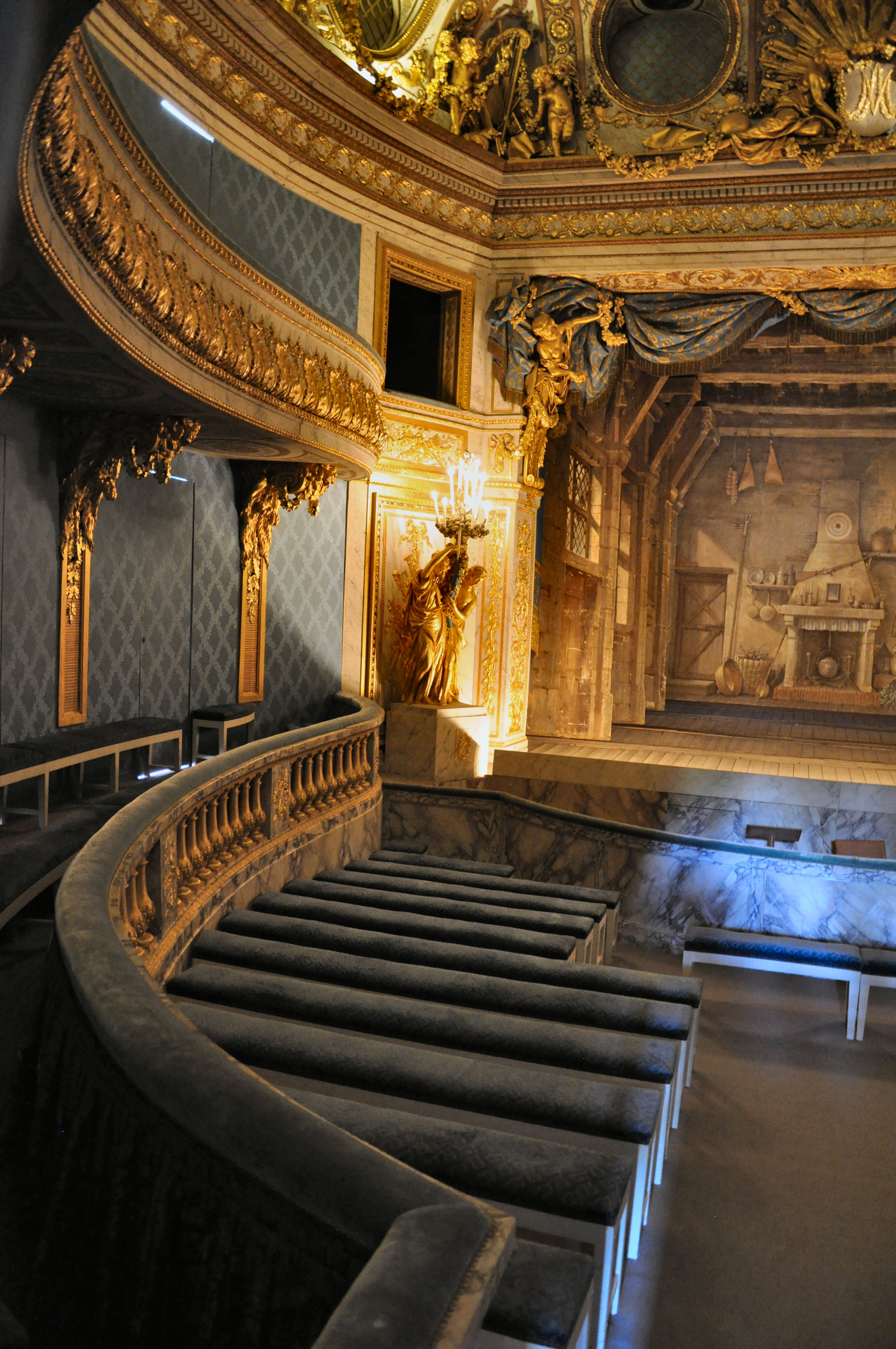
Interior

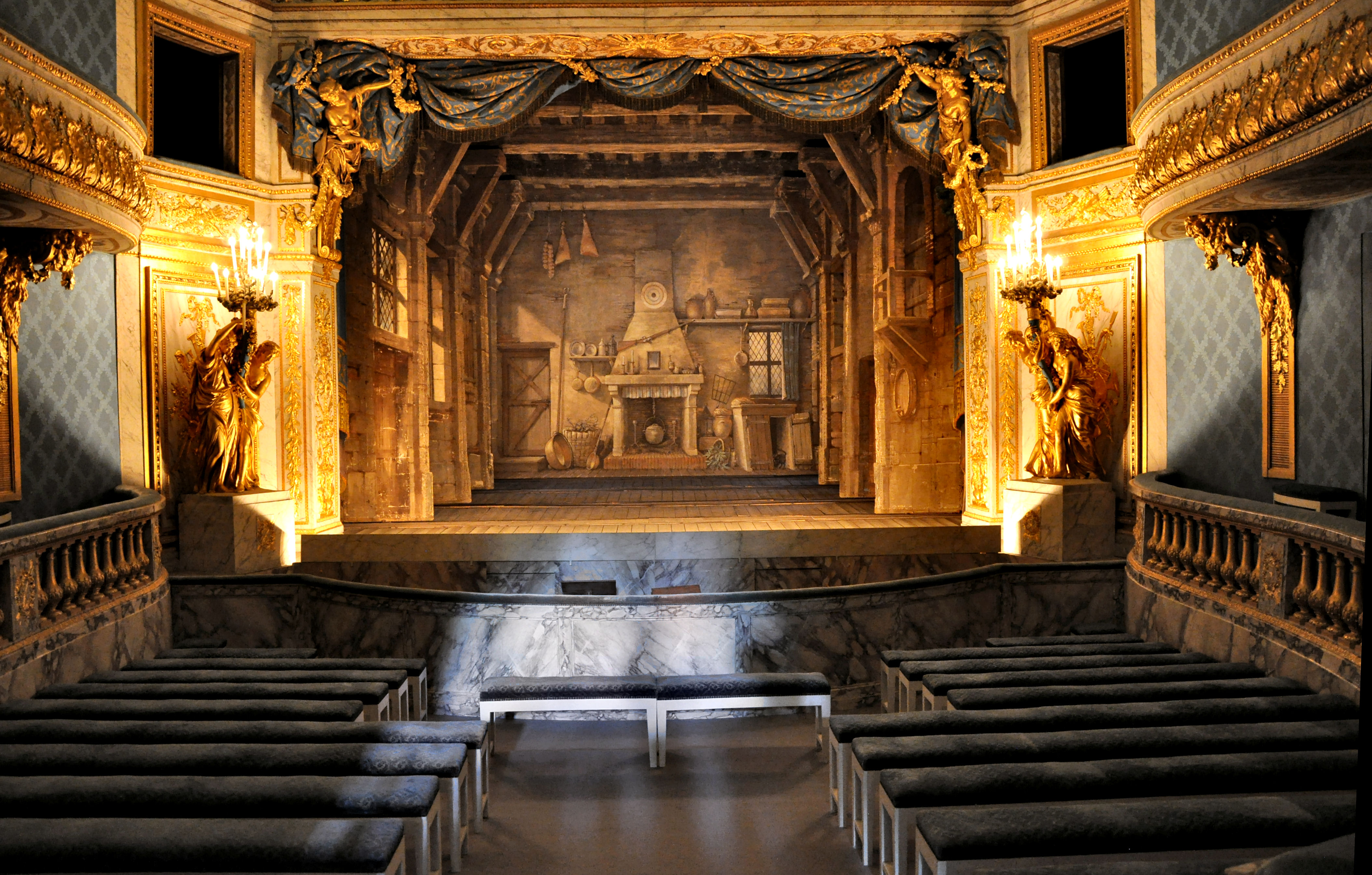
Interior

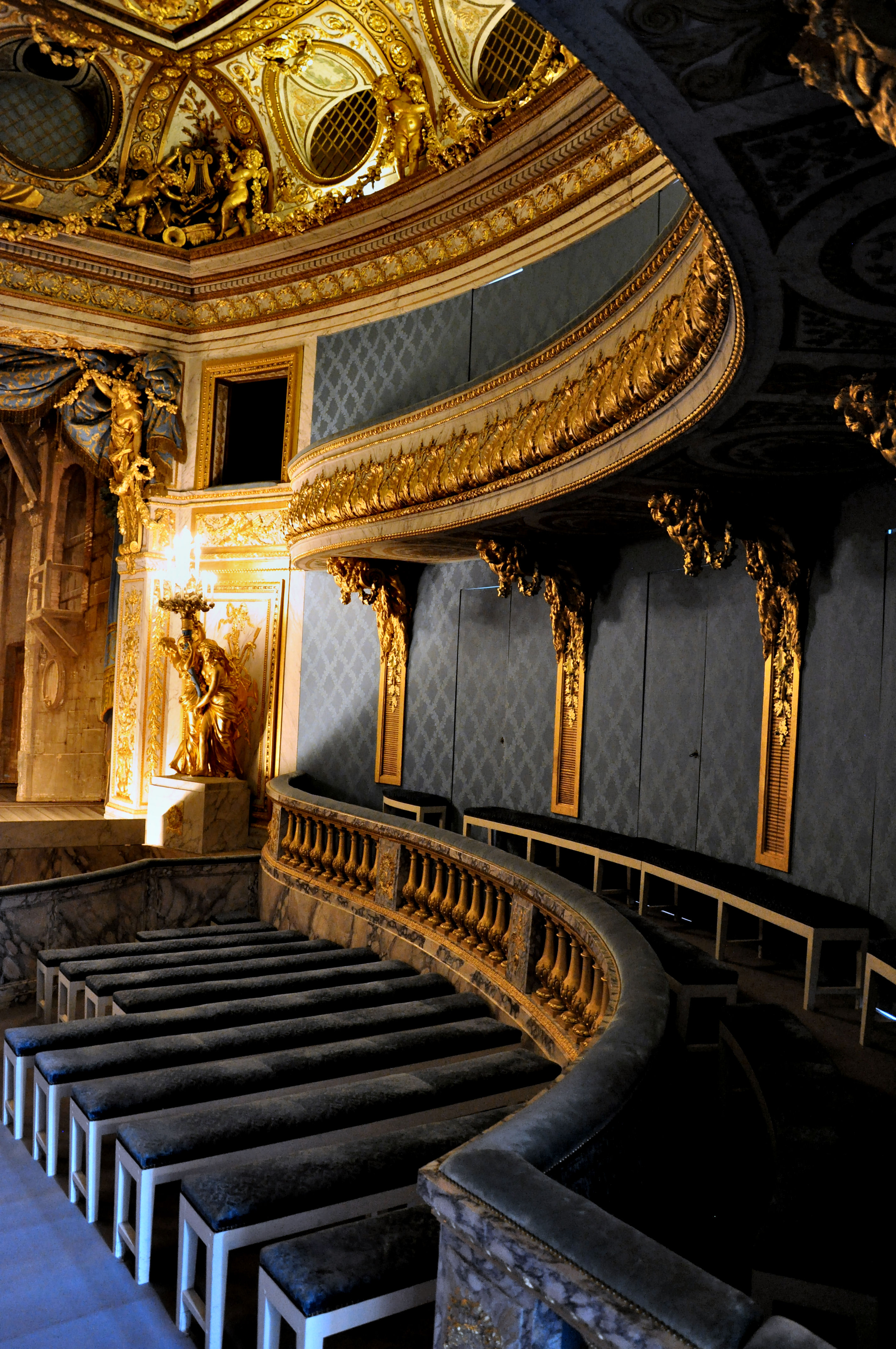
Interior

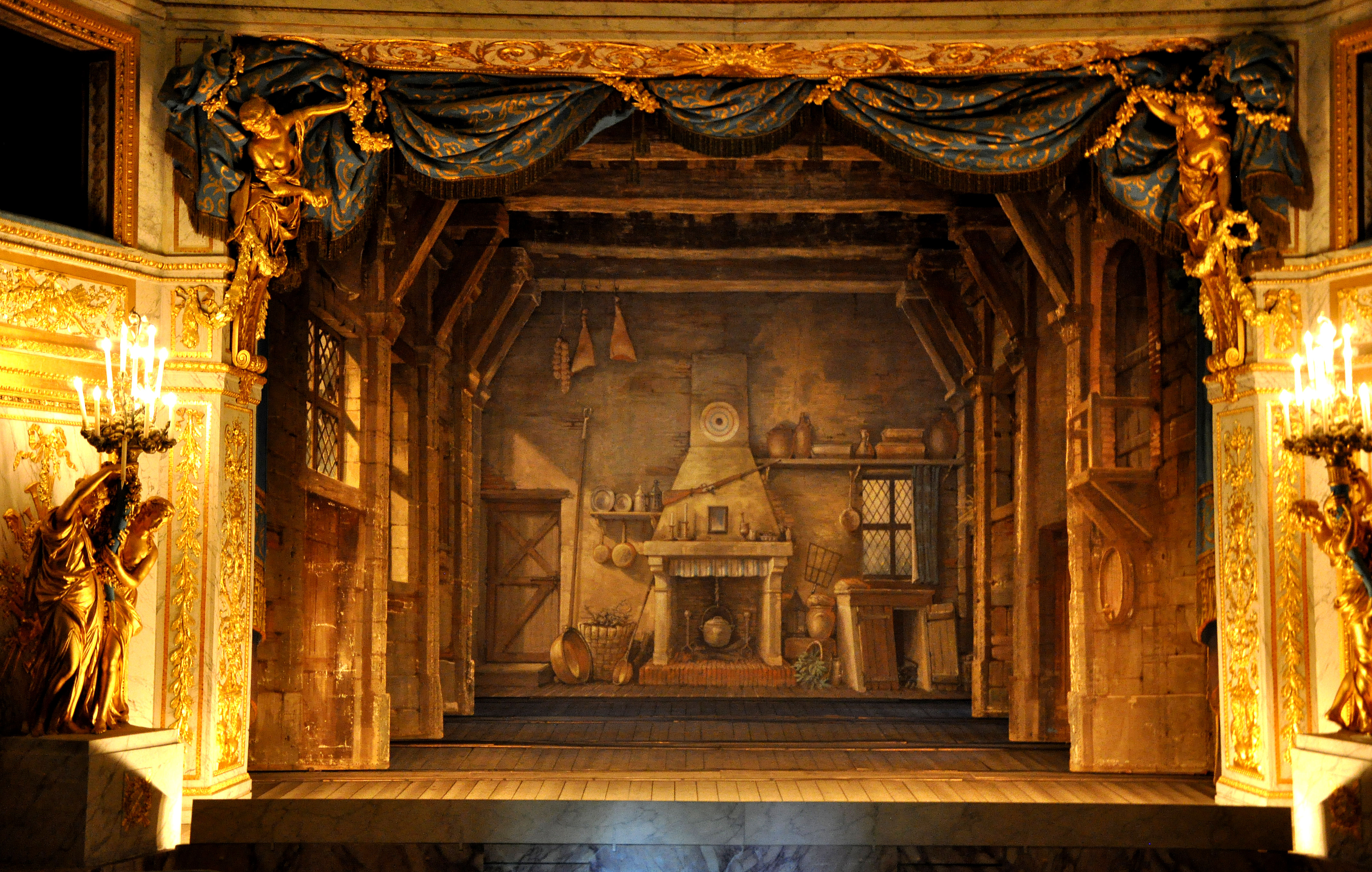
Cottage set for Le Roi and le fermier

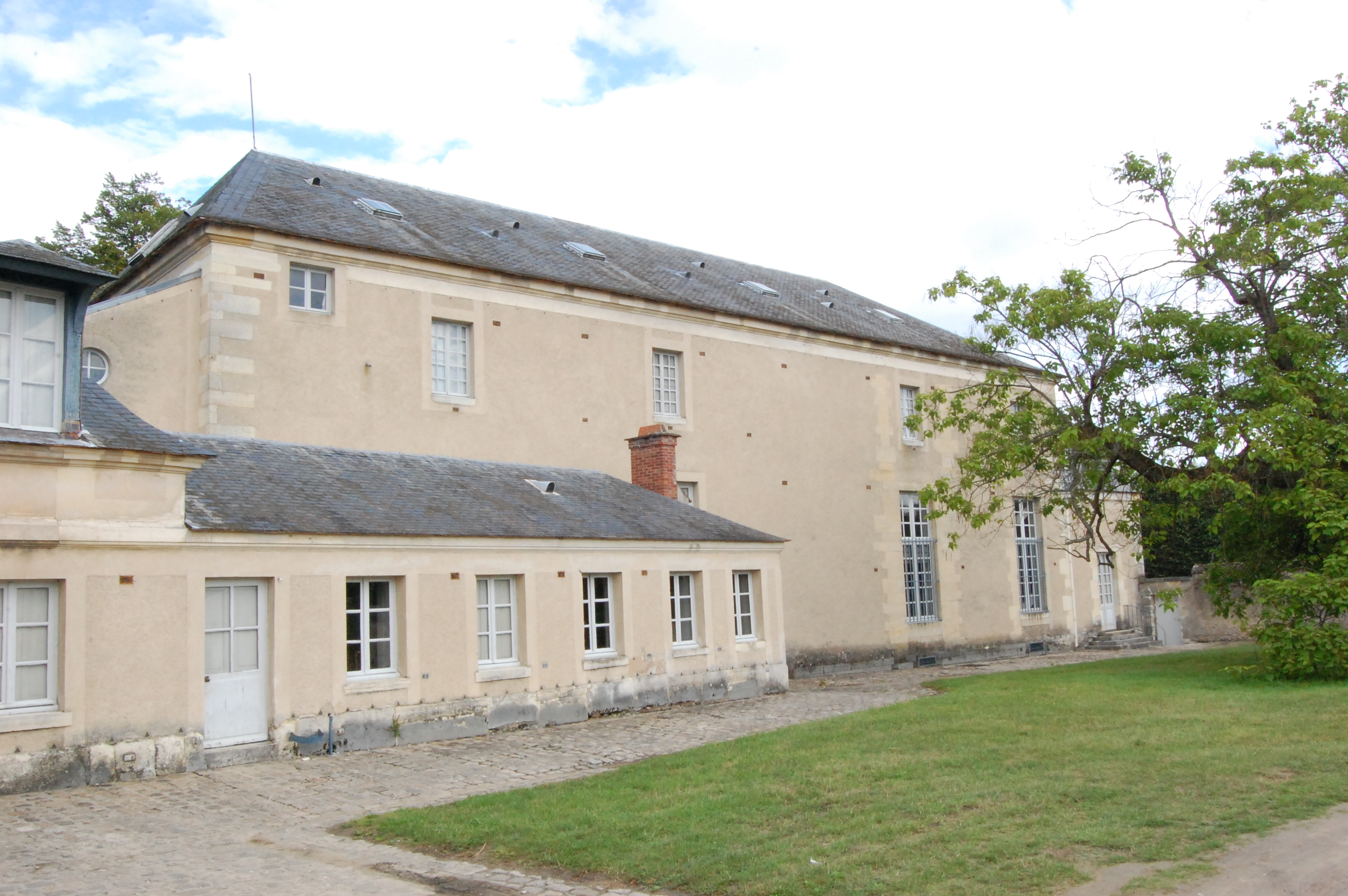
Exterior
