= Claude-Louis Châtelet =

French painter

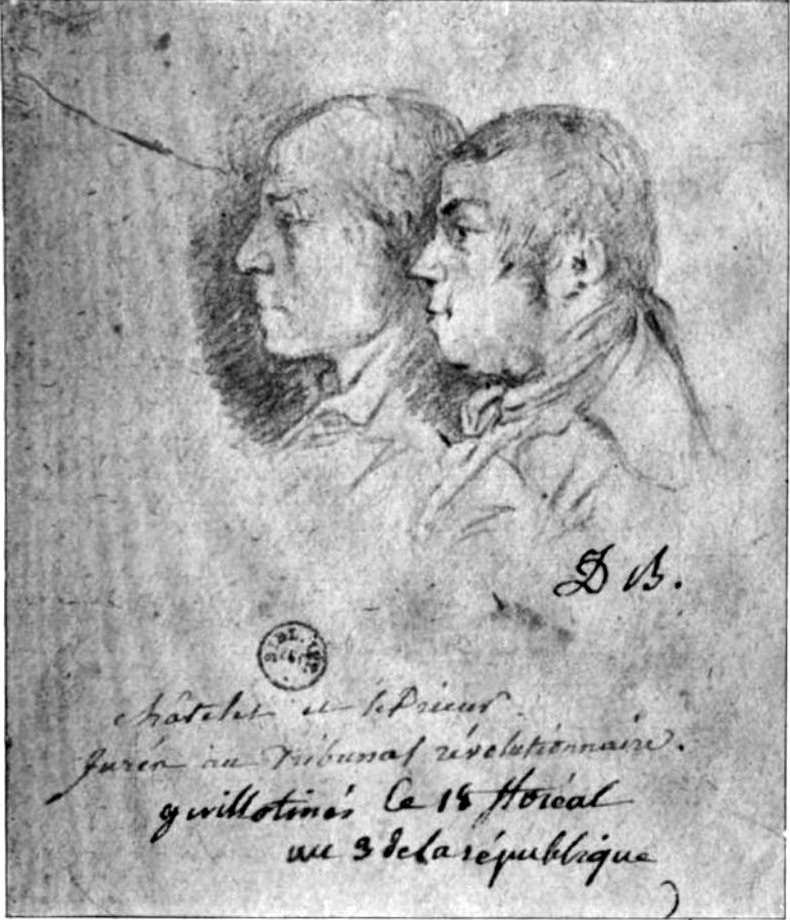
Portrait of Châtelet and Le Prieur, two members of the Revolutionary Tribunal. Author is unknown.

Claude-Louis Châtelet (1753–1795) was a French painter born in Paris. He produced Swiss views, sea-pieces, and pastoral scenes in the style of Vernet. Examples of his work are in the Orléans Museum, the Palace at Fontainebleau, and the Cottier Collection. He embraced with ardour the cause of the Revolution, allied himself with Robespierre and the leaders of the Jacobins, and became a member of the Revolutionary Tribunal. He was arrested some months after the 9th Thermidor, tried, condemned, and executed in Paris, May 7, 1795.

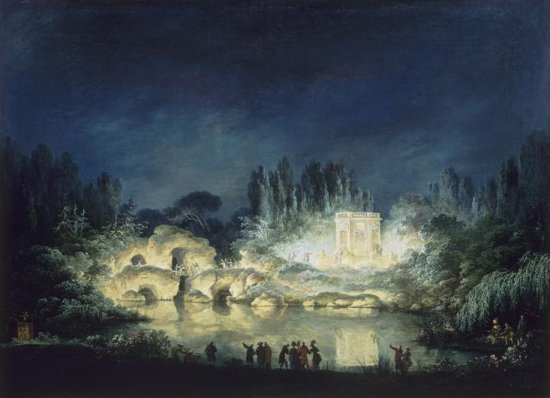
Illumination of the Belvédère Pavillon, Petit Trianon, 1781, now at the Palace of Versailles

Plan du jardin et chateau de la Reine
