= Richard Mique =

French architect (1728–1794)

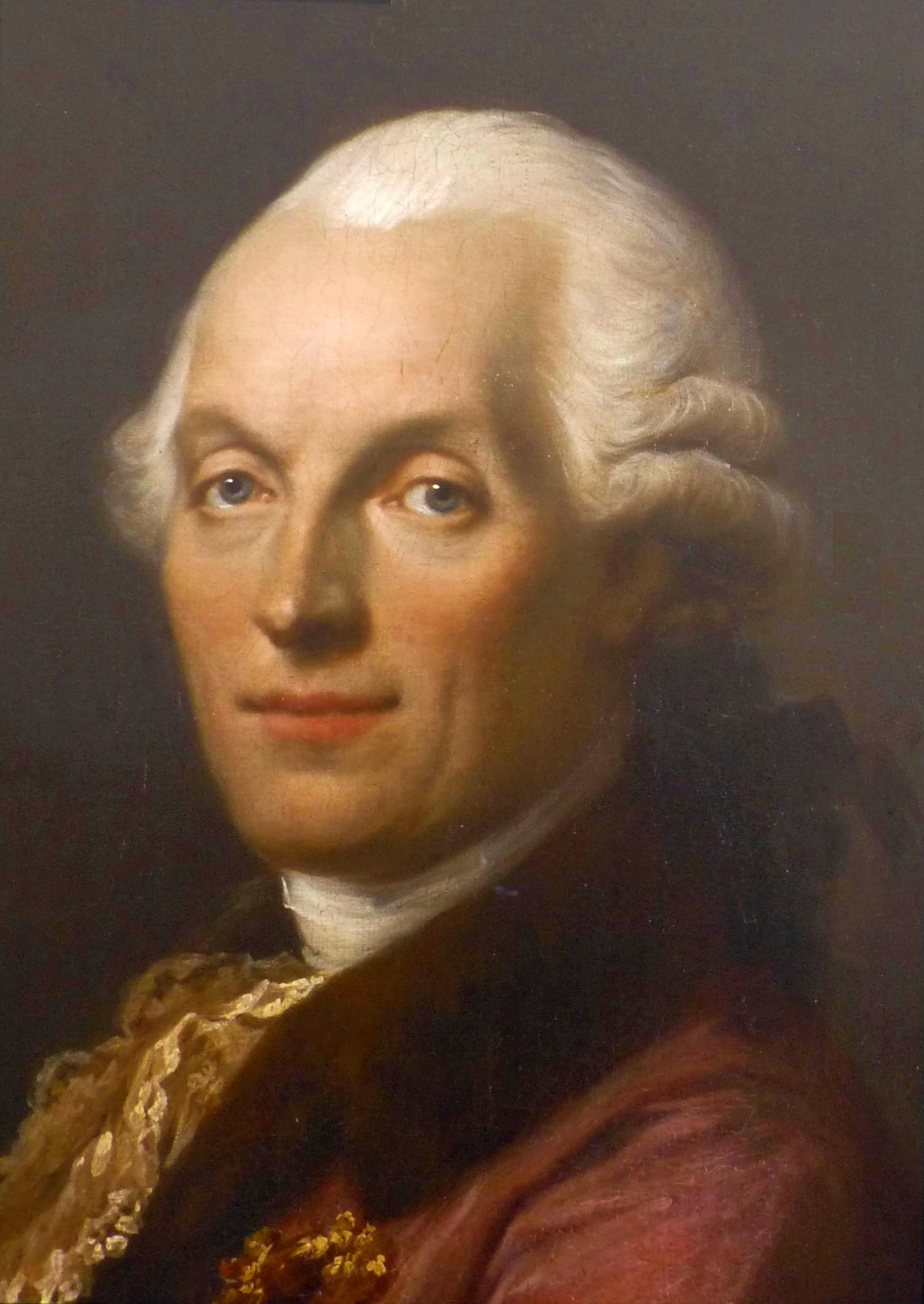
A portrait of Richard Mique by Johann Julius Heinsius

Richard Mique (French pronunciation: [ʁiʃaːʁ mik]) (18 September 1728 – 8 July 1794) was a Neoclassical French architect born in Lorraine. He is most remembered for his picturesque hamlet, the hameau de la Reine — not particularly characteristic of his working style — built for Queen Marie Antoinette in the Petit Trianon gardens within the estate of the Palace of Versailles.

== Biography ==
Richard Mique was born in Nancy as the son of Simon Mique, an architect and entrepreneur of Lunéville and grandson of Pierre Mique, also an architect. Following their example, he became an architect in the service of Stanisław Leszczyński, the deposed King of Poland and father of Marie Leszczyńska, the wife of Louis XV. Following the death of Emmanuel Héré de Corny, Mique participated as premier architecte in Stanisław's grand plans for reordering and embellishing Nancy, his capital as Duke of Lorraine. Stanisław made him a chevalier of the ordre de Saint-Michel and manoeuvred unsuccessfully to have Mique placed on the payroll of the Bâtiments du roi. Following his patron's death in February 1766, Mique was called to France the following October, at the suggestion of Marie Leszczyńska's Polish confessor. His official career in France was initially stymied by the influence of Ange-Jacques Gabriel, Premier architecte du Roi. His main clients were a series of royal ladies. For Marie Leszczyńska he built a convent, prominently sited in the town of Versailles, on lands at the edge of the park belonging formerly to Madame de Montespan's château de Clagny, of which eleven hectares were consigned to the Queen by her husband Louis XV. At the queen's death, her daughter Madame Adélaïde completed the project.

Mique must have gained the confidence of the Dauphin and the Dauphine for, upon the accession of the Dauphin as Louis XVI in 1774, he was appointed intendant et contrôleur général des Bâtiments du Roi; he succeeded Gabriel as Premier architecte to Louis XVI the following year, thus overseeing the last works carried out at Versailles before the French Revolution. He purchased a seigneurie in Lorraine, which completed his transformation to courtier-architect.

He laid out the Queen's garden at the Petit Trianon from 1774 to 1785 perhaps in collaboration with the painter Hubert Robert. The design was based on sketches by the comte de Caraman, an inspired amateur of gardening. Mique was also responsible for the hameau de la Reine, a village with a functioning farm built around an artificial lake at the northeastern corner of the estate.

During the Revolution, he was arrested along with his son as participants in a conspiracy to save the life of Queen Marie Antoinette, whose favorite architect he had been. He was brought before a revolutionary tribunal and, after a summary trial on 7 July 1794, both father and son were condemned to death and murdered at the guillotine the following day. This was just three weeks before the fall of Maximilien Robespierre and the end of the Reign of Terror.

Pierre de Nolhac, the historian of the château de Versailles, in Le Trianon de Marie-Antoinette (1914), found Mique to have been 'un artiste savant, habile, et digne de plus de gloire' A street in the town of Versailles commemorates his name.

== Works ==
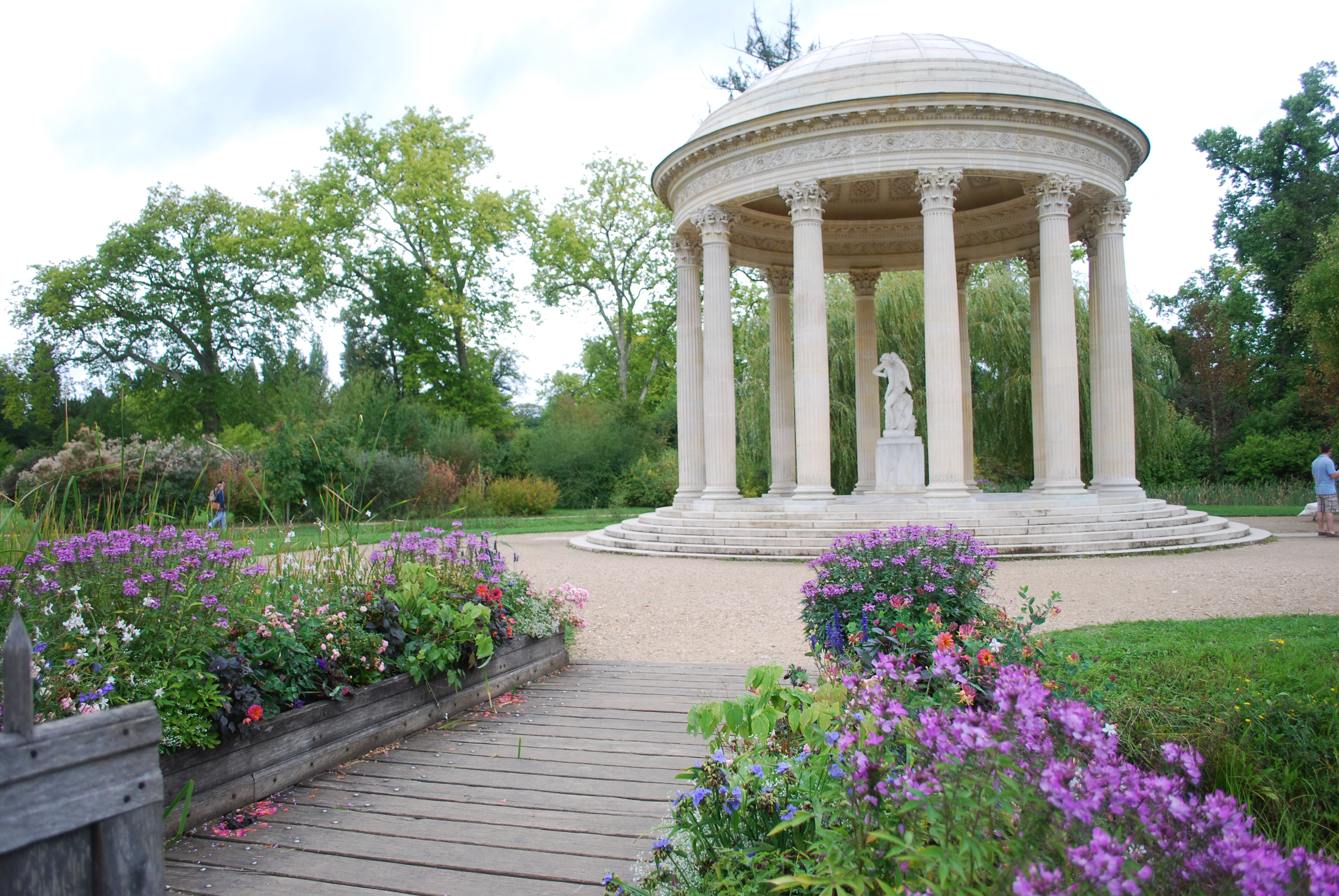
The Temple of Love at Versailles in the summer

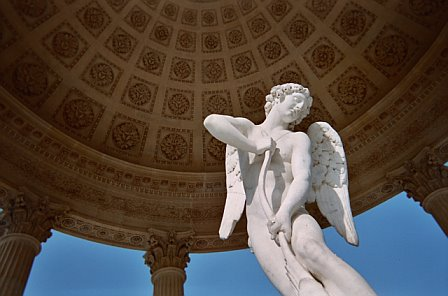
Detail of the Temple of Love

- 1762 : His first known design, for a kiosk in the gardens of Lunéville.
- 1763-64 Two gates for the city of Nancy: the porte Sainte-Catherine and the porte Stanislas already show the Neoclassical taste.
- 1765 : Plans for the Sainte-Catherine barracks at Nancy.
- 1767-72 : Buildings for an Ursuline convent in the town of Versailles for Marie Leszczyńska. The convent now houses the lycée Hoche. Mique's first two plans were rejected. The third executed design is similar to Jacques-Germain Soufflot's Church of Sainte-Geneviève in Paris.
- 1775-84 : All the structures, including the bridge, that form the hameau de la Reine in the garden of the Petit Trianon at Versailles. Mique carried it out in its naturalistic jardin anglo-chinois probably laid out in collaboration with the painter Hubert Robert; for inspiration, he was directed to visit the Anglo-Chinese park at Ermenonville.
- 1775-85 : Church of the Carmelites, Saint-Denis for the aunt of Louis XVI, Madame Louise, who had become a nun in the convent at Saint-Denis. Madame Louise dictated in detail the subjects she wanted for the sculptural decorations. The Neoclassical building, with a Corinthian portico adapted from the Roman Maison carrée at Nîmes, was consecrated 28 May 1784.
- 1777 : Turkish boudoir for Marie Antoinette at the château de Fontainebleau.
- 1778-79 : The private theatre of Marie Antoinette at the Petit Trianon.
- 1778-81 : The octagonal belvedere (1778–81), consecrated to the Seasons, the Pavillon du rocher and the Temple de l'Amour in the newly-created gardens of the Petit Trianon at Versailles. The Temple of Love, visible from the Queen's bedroom, was the setting for many fêtes.
- 1780 : Hôtel de la Surintendance, Versailles.
- 1780s : Château de Bellevue, alterations in the interior (demolished) and alterations to the park, which required 42,000 new trees and a hermitage, for Mesdames, the daughters of Louis XV.
- 1782 : Consolidation of the tower at the cathédrale d'Orléans (1782-1787).
- 1785 : Modifications at the château de Saint-Cloud for Marie Antoinette (burned in 1870 and destroyed in 1891).
- 1785 : Boudoir for Marie Antoinette at the Petit Trianon.
