= École de Versailles =

French equestrian school (1680–1830)

The Versailles school was the cradle of French equitation until 1830. The doctrine of the school's many masters is poorly documented; teaching was verbal, and only Montfaucon de Rogles wrote a treatise specifying the doctrine taught within the riding arena.

== Origins ==
Originating in Italy, the equestrian art developed in France during the Renaissance, thanks to famous equerries such as Pluvinel, followed by Mesmont, Antoine de Vendeuil, la Guérinière, Villemotte and François Pagès-Vitrac. For the kings of France, the quality of their stables was a mark of their power. It was therefore important to them that the military nobility received high-quality equestrian training. In addition, hunting demanded that the Court had horses and carriages to match. When Louis XIV moved his residence to Versailles, it was only natural that he should build stables worthy of his plans. The Tuileries riding school was abandoned by the court, but taken over by François Robichon de la Guérinière.

== Timeline ==
- 1680: creation of the École de Versailles by bringing together the King's Petite and Grande Écurie.
- 1682: inauguration by Louis XIV, then aged 44.
- 1793: the Convention abolishes all royal schools.
- 1796: the Executive Directory decides to create a "national riding school" at the Versailles riding academy.
- 1810: closure of the "Versailles riding academy", transformed into the "École spéciale de cavalerie de Saint Germain".
- 1814: reopening of the riding school under the direction of Viscount d'Abzac.
- 1822: dissolution of the school after the general Breton who commanded it staged a Bonapartist-inspired coup d'état.
- 1830: permanent closure of the academy.

== Horse stables ==
The École de Versailles was made up of the Petite and Grande Écuries. This distinction dates back to François 1st. The Grande Écurie housed war and parade horses, while the Petite Écurie housed post and carriage horses.

The Versailles stables housed up to 650 horses and certainly more than 200 carriages.

=== Buildings ===
After the first King's stables were created in Versailles in the 1670s, the buildings were constructed by Jules Hardouin-Mansart and completed in 1681 and 1682 respectively. They were built on the east side, so that the park and surrounding woods could be admired from the Palace's west-facing windows. They were built on the site of the de Noailles and de Lauzun townhouses, which were demolished for the purpose. The two buildings are almost identical, with a rounded shape facing the Palace.

=== Grande Écurie ===
The large stable housed war, riding, parade and hunting horses. Quarries and kennels were located behind it. The manège, measuring 16.75 m by 47.80 m, is at the center of the semicircle formed by the Grande Écurie. It was abandoned in the eighteenth century as too small. Before the construction of the Opéra de Versailles, it was used for theatrical and equestrian performances. A carrousel was held in the main courtyard, which was cleared for every of these occasions.

It was headed by the Grand Squire of France, known as "Monsieur le Grand", who was assisted by a commanding squire. It was composed of three categories of officers: those who served on a daily basis, those of the King's stud and those who performed ceremonial service. The latter category included the heralds, the pursuers, the sword-bearers and the corps of musicians (also known as "Musique de la Grande Écurie") attached to the Grande Écurie. These musicians accompanied certain military events, hunting parties and festive or outdoor events. The ensemble comprised about forty wind and percussion instruments. Its musicians, who rarely knew how to read or write, were held in lower esteem than their colleagues in the Chapelle royale and in the Maison du roi. However, some musicians belonged to two or even three of these ensembles.

The grand squire also had authority over the king's page school, founded in 1682 by Louis XIV, and was in direct command of the page school in the Grande Écurie. The first squire, known as "Monsieur le Premier", directed the page school in the Petite Écurie.

Since 2003, the manège of the Grande Écurie has been home to the Equestrian Show Academy, directed by Bartabas. Today, the Equestrian Show Academy is home to approximately forty horses.

=== Petite Écurie ===
The Petite Écurie housed the horses most commonly used by the king, as well as the crew, carriages and other carriages they pulled, as well as the litters.

It has no riding arena and only an open-air rotunda matches the Grande Écurie's manège.

It was headed by the First Squire, known as "Monsieur le Premier", and comprised twenty squires serving each quarter, thirty pages and twenty-four footmen, not to mention coachmen, saddlers, grooms and postilions. The First Squirre was in charge of the king's page school in his Petire Écurie.

In 1787, for reasons of economy, the activities of the Petite Écurie were abolished and attached to the Grande Écurie.

== Squires ==
The squires who made the Versailles riding school famous were:

- Du Vernet du Plessis (1620-1696) or Duplessis, to whom Louis XIV entrusted the equestrian education of the Dauphin.
- Du Vernet de la Vallée, mentioned by La Guérinière as well as the previous one, in his cavalry academy.
- Antoine de Vendeuil, La Guérinière's master.
- Cazaux de Nestier (1684-1754), First cavalcadour squire, gave riding lessons to the young King Louis XV. He remains famous for his perfect riding position. He used very soft bits for the time, which he himself transformed, with short shanks and straight barrels. Renowned for riding difficult horses, he also selected and trained the king's personal horses. He made Limousin horses fashionable.
- François de Montrognon de Salvert remained a squire for 33 years, from 1718 to 1751. His pupils included the Comte de Lubersac and Montfaucon de Rogles.
- Count of Lubersac (1713-1767) headed the school of light horses after having been a squire at the Grande Écurie. He trained his horses exclusively to walk. After years of perfect relaxation, the horse could be trained in all gaits. With the walk, he was able to detect any resistance in the horse and remedy it.
- Montfaucon de Rogles (1717-1760), "ordinary squire of the Petite Écurie du Roi, commanding the crew of the late Monseigneur le Dauphin", defined the doctrine of the Royal stables at Versailles in his treatise on equitation (1788). He commanded the riding academy of light horses. He wrote a treatise on equitation (1778 and 1810), the only document to define the doctrine taught at the Versailles riding school.
- Jean François Brunet de Neuilly, a squire until 1773, had as pupils the Prince of Lambesc and the Viscount of Abzac.
- Charles-Eugène de Lorraine, Prince of Lambesc (1751-1825), was the last Grand Squire of the Ancien Régime.
- Marquis François Étienne Michel de La Bigne (1742-1827), who took an hour to cross the Place d'Armes at full gallop.
- Viscount Pierre Marie d'Abzac (1744-1827), squire from 1763 to 1781, emigrated to Germany during the French Revolution. He taught riding to 3 kings, Louis XVI, Louis XVIII and Charles X.
- Knight Jean François d'Abzac, brother of the former (1754-1820), took over his brother's position in 1781. He trained the Count of Aure.
- Antoine Philippe Henry Cartier d'Aure (1799-1863).
- Charles Antoine Count of Gourcy-Récicourt (1801-1858), successively hand squire and cavalcadour to King Charles X.

In the 16th century, cavalcadour was the name given to the rider who exercised foals and rode horses under the direction of the cavalerice, a term used to designate the horseman who combined experience with talent and knowledge. This term remained in use in France until the fall of the Ancien Régime, i.e. until 1830. However, as in La Broue's day, the term was no longer applied to the inexperienced horseman, but to the squire who, for the king and princes, commanded the stable of horses that served their person.

As for the qualification of ordinary squire, it applied to squires whose duties continued throughout the year, as opposed to those who served by quarter. There were around ten of them, and each was assisted by a cavalcadour squire who could be called upon to deputise for him in his absence.

== Organization ==
At Versailles, equestrian training was an important part of the apprenticeship reserved for the military nobility. Pupils were few in number. A very small number of students came, as a special favor, to learn for themselves and for no other purpose.

=== Student squires ===
A few young family members, suitable to become student squires or squires. Student squires were specially employed in the manège. There were different types of squires, each with their own court duties. Manège squires were the least numerous.

=== Bodyguards ===
Four bodyguards, sent by the companies to act as instructors. Repeated requests to admit more bodyguards and officers of the royal guard were formally refused.

=== Pages ===
Only young gentlemen who could prove their nobility dated back to at least 1550 could apply for admission and training at the école de pages in the king's Grande or Petite Écurie.

In the seventeenth and eighteenth centuries, their lineage was established by a genealogist from the d'Hozier family, who held the office of Judge-of-Arms of France and was genealogist to the King.

Pages were admitted to either the Grande or Petite Écurie:

- For those in the Grande Écurie, known as "de la couronne", it was necessary to: "...be of ancient and military nobility at least since the year 1550, in accordance with the King's intention...". They were assigned to ceremonial services, including the great hunts.
- Those of the Petite Écurie had to: "...establish the degrees of (their) filiation..., at least up to (their) fourth ayeul (male ancestor) and up to the year 1550, without any ennoblement, relief of nobility or privilege attributing nobility, since the said year 1550..." and "...justify that the gentleman who presents himself to be page of His Majesty, is incontestably of a nobility whose possession could not be revoked in doubt...".

The reception as "page of the king in his Grande Écurie" was, for a family, an honor that came just after that of the honors of the Court. In the old order of honors, reception as "page of the king in his Petite Écurie" came just after reception in the Grande Écurie.

At the page school, they received general instruction as at any other school, but also other instructions more related to their service, such as swordsmanship and horsemanship. They were also expected to participate in the king's service at the Palace and follow him to war. When the king or a member of the royal family (except the queen, who had her own pages) had to move around Versailles at nightfall in the palace or gardens, it was up to six pages from his Grande Écurie, each carrying a torch, to precede him, opening and lighting the way.

Admitted "to the renewal of the livery" at around the age of fifteen, they were also known for their boisterous nature and poor attendance, which was a source of amusement at Court.

In the 18th century, most of the king's pages were future cavalry officers. Their recruitment was codified by the King in November 1721 for the Grande Écurie and in June 1729 for the Petite Écurie. The duration of studies at the page school was three years, and annual recruitment averaged twenty-two new entrants. Including the last admission, in 1830, the total number of pages was two hundred and eighteen.

=== Service staff ===
Service workers were destined to become sous piqueurs or piqueurs one day. These students were divided into two categories: the "blue students" and the "braided students". They took their name from their uniform, which was simply blue for the former, and the same color but with braids on the sleeves and pockets for the latter. They were attached to the saddle, the riding school and, exceptionally, the carriage. When the king's stables were reorganized in 1816, there were seven "blue students" and six "braided students". Subsequently, their numbers varied. Vacancies for piqueurs were rare, and for reasons of economy, the number was further reduced. Thus, from 1819 to 1830, leaving aside the saddle and carriage services, which required a larger number of piqueurs, the École de Versailles itself had only one piqueur, Bellanger, and one sub-piqueur, Bergeret, for its particular service.

== Education ==
At the time of its creation (1682), the heavy tack of the Middle Ages was disappearing. The great squires of the school therefore advocated a more flexible, natural position, with a finer, more diversified use of aids. It was at this point that the notion of equestrian tact was born. Riding became an art.

The first three years were devoted to perfecting the seat by working without stirrups. In addition to riding, the school taught mathematics, drawing, writing and various military disciplines.

When the d'Abzac brothers were in charge of the manège at the King's two stables, from 1763 to around 1820, the École de Versailles rejected all allures of fantasy in favor of a classical Haute École and an equitation deemed refined:

- To free "equitation from all the superfluities and uselessness in vogue at the time of Pluvinel" (d'Aure);
- Seek "regularity and elegance of position, finesse of aids, gentleness in the use of means of domination" (l'Hotte);
- Reject "everything that good taste rejects in equitation";
- Obtaining perfection in the rider's position: "In this riding school, the greatest care was given to the rectitude, the elegance of the position, to the point that it was enough to see a rider coming out of this school to be able to say: "He's a pupil of Versailles". In those days, it was said: "He who is not a handsome horseman cannot be a good horseman." (l'Hotte).

== Criticism ==
From the mid-18th century onwards, the École de Versailles came in for criticism. The mounted regiments of the Maison du Roi were severely reduced under Louis XV and Louis XVI. Arabian and English horses made their appearance at Court, to the detriment of Andalusian horses. The instruction given to military cavalrymen was itself criticized, notably by Guibert, who felt that riding exercises occupied an exaggeratedly important place.
