= The King's, then Queen's stables =

Royal stables at Versailles, France

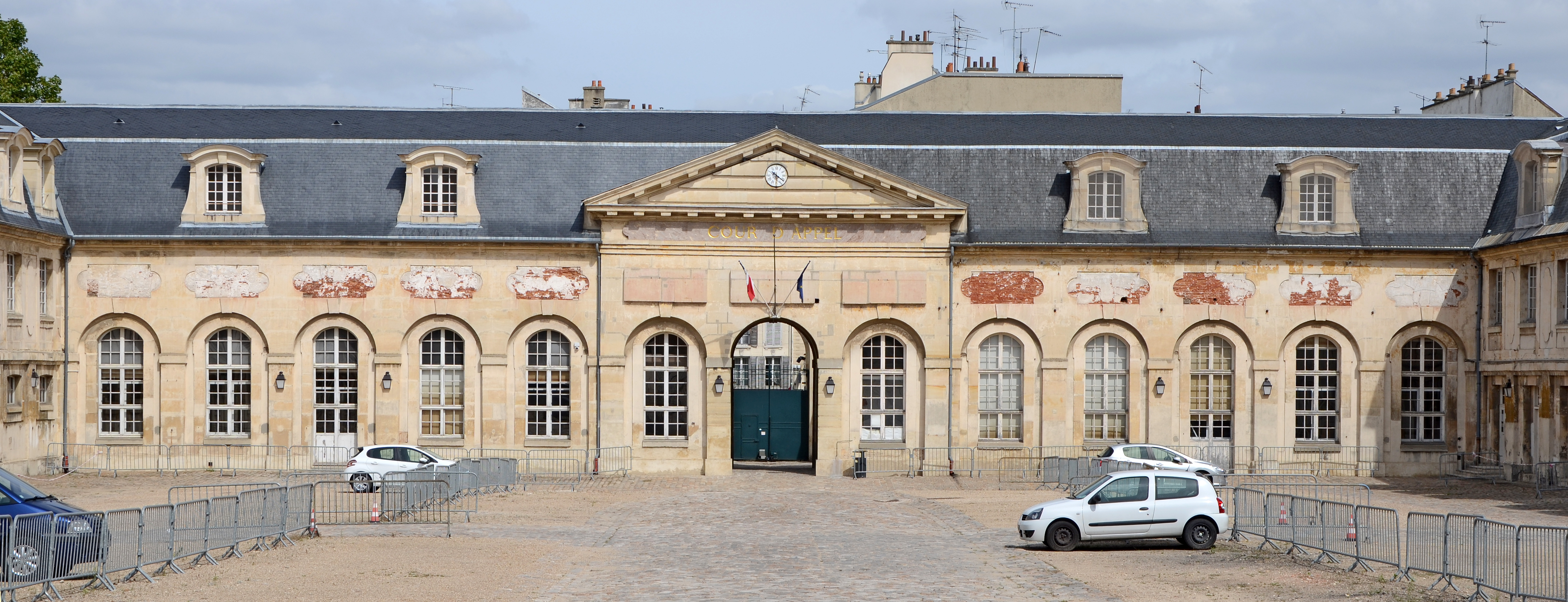
- The Grande Écurie at the Palace of Versailles, taken from the Pavillon Dufour.

- Location within Île-de-France (region)
- 48°48′24″N 2°07′35″E
- Location: Versailles, Yvelines; France

History
- Built: 1672 (purchase of land)

Monument historique
- Original purpose: Horse stable
- Current purpose: Versailles Court of Appeal.

The King's Stables are located in Versailles, at 5 Carnot street, a few hundred meters from the Palace. Constituting the Royal Stables (an institution employing hundreds of people at the time of Louis XIV's installation at Versailles), they were built in 1672.

Deemed too small, they were quickly replaced in the 1680s by the Petite Écurie and the Grande Écurie of the Place d'Armes. They were then offered to the Queen and became the Queen's Stables.

They are now occupied by the Versailles Court of Appeal.

They were listed as a historic monument in 1978.

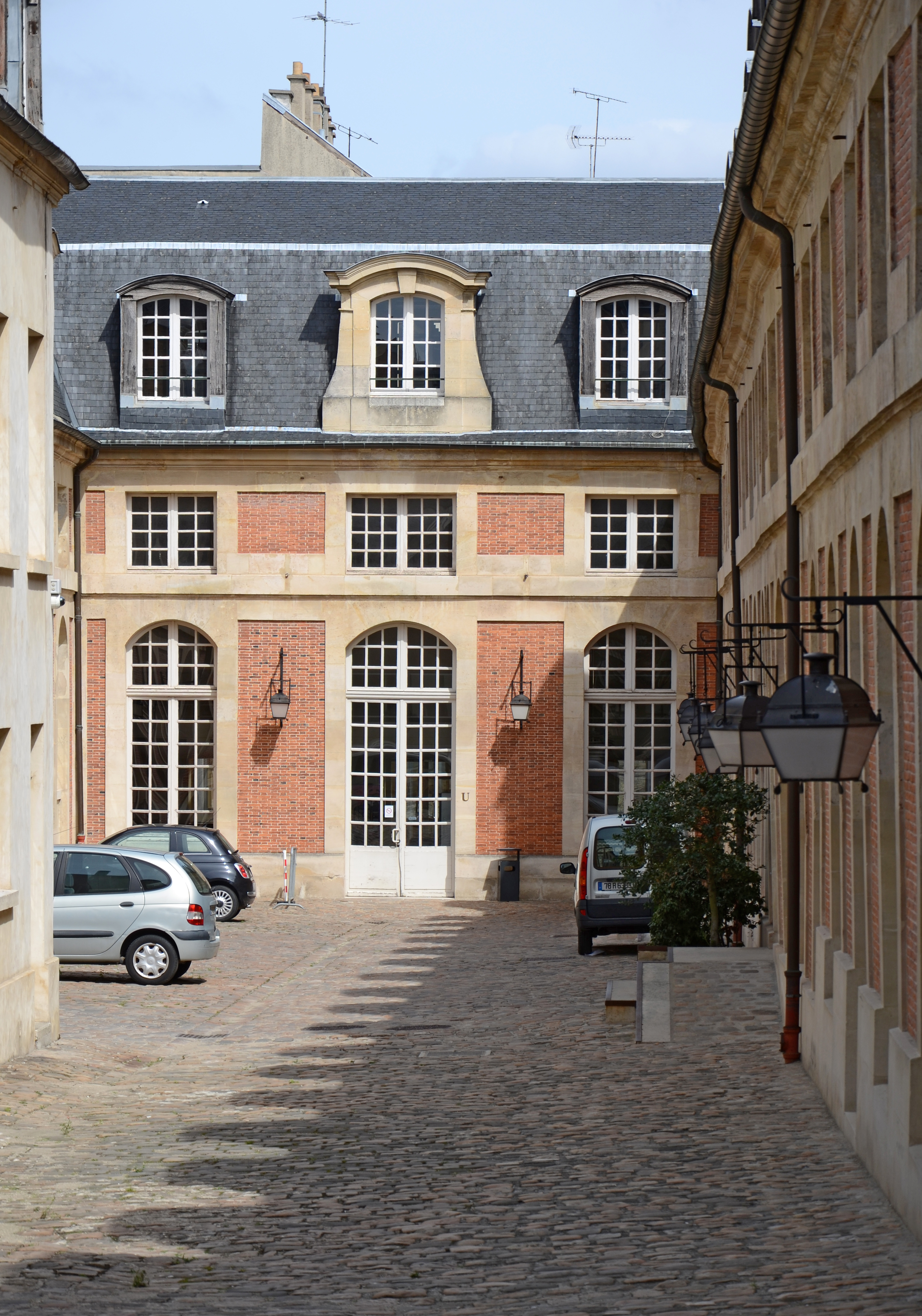
Detail of the stables: single-level building, brick walls, mansard roofs: the Louis XIV's style.

== See also ==
- Petite Écurie
- Grande Écurie
- Galerie des Carrosses
