= Petite Écurie =

Monument in Versailles, France

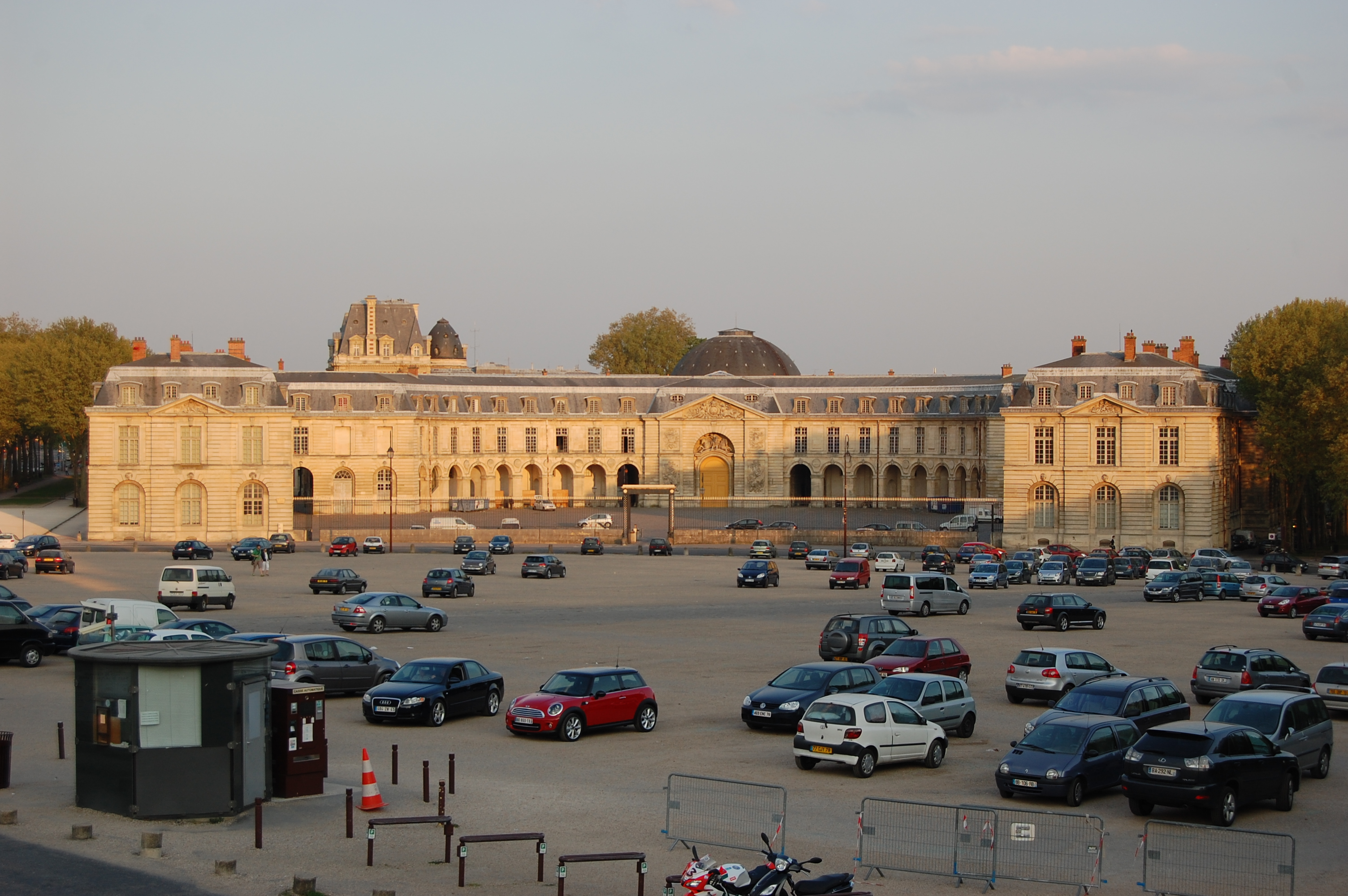

- Location within Île-de-France (region)
- 48°48′07″N 2°07′36″E
- Location: Versailles, Yvelines; France

History
- Built: 1681

Site notes
- Architect: Jules Hardouin-Mansart

Monument historique
- Original purpose: Horse stable
- Current purpose: École nationale supérieure d’architecture de Versailles workshops of the C2RMF
- Address: Place d'Armes

The Petite Écurie (French pronunciation: [pətit ekyʁi]) is a monument located in Versailles, on the Place d'Armes, opposite the Palace of Versailles, between the Avenue de Paris and the Avenue de Sceaux. Together with the Grande Écurie, it formed the Écuries royales (an institution employing some 1,000 people under Louis XIV), and was built under the direction of architect Jules Hardouin-Mansart and completed in 1681.

Today, it houses the École Nationale Supérieure d'Architecture de Versailles and the workshops of the Centre for Research and Restoration of Museums of France.

== History ==
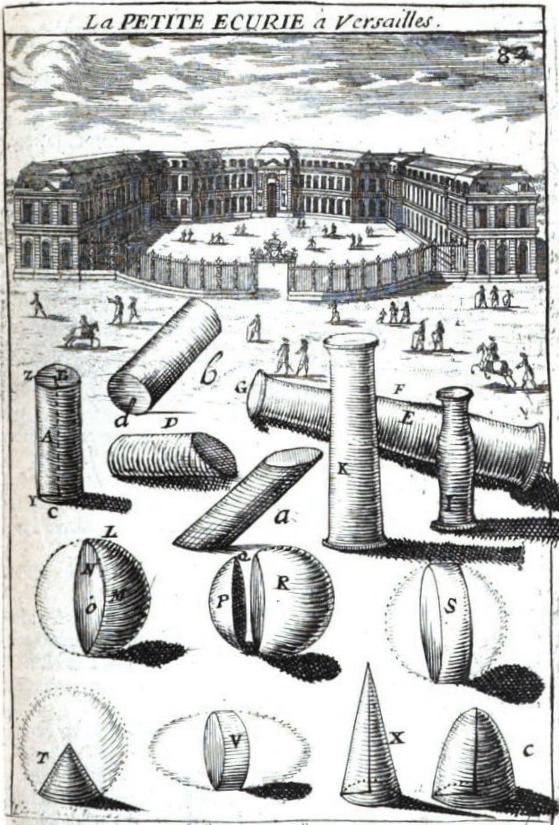
Plate from La Géométrie pratique (1702) by Manesson Mallet, mathematics master to the pages of the Petite Écurie.

The École de Versailles consisted of the Petite Écurie and the Grande Écurie.

Identical to the Grande Écurie, from which it is separated by the Avenue de Paris, under the Ancien Régime, the Petite Écurie was under the orders of the Premier Écuyer. It was in charge of horses and carriages, as well as fancy vehicles such as gondola sleighs.

=== The Maréchalerie ===
From 1683 to 1685, The Maréchalerie was built behind the Petite Écurie. This establishment completed the activities of two stables. It replaced the modest King's stable, which then became the Queen's stable.

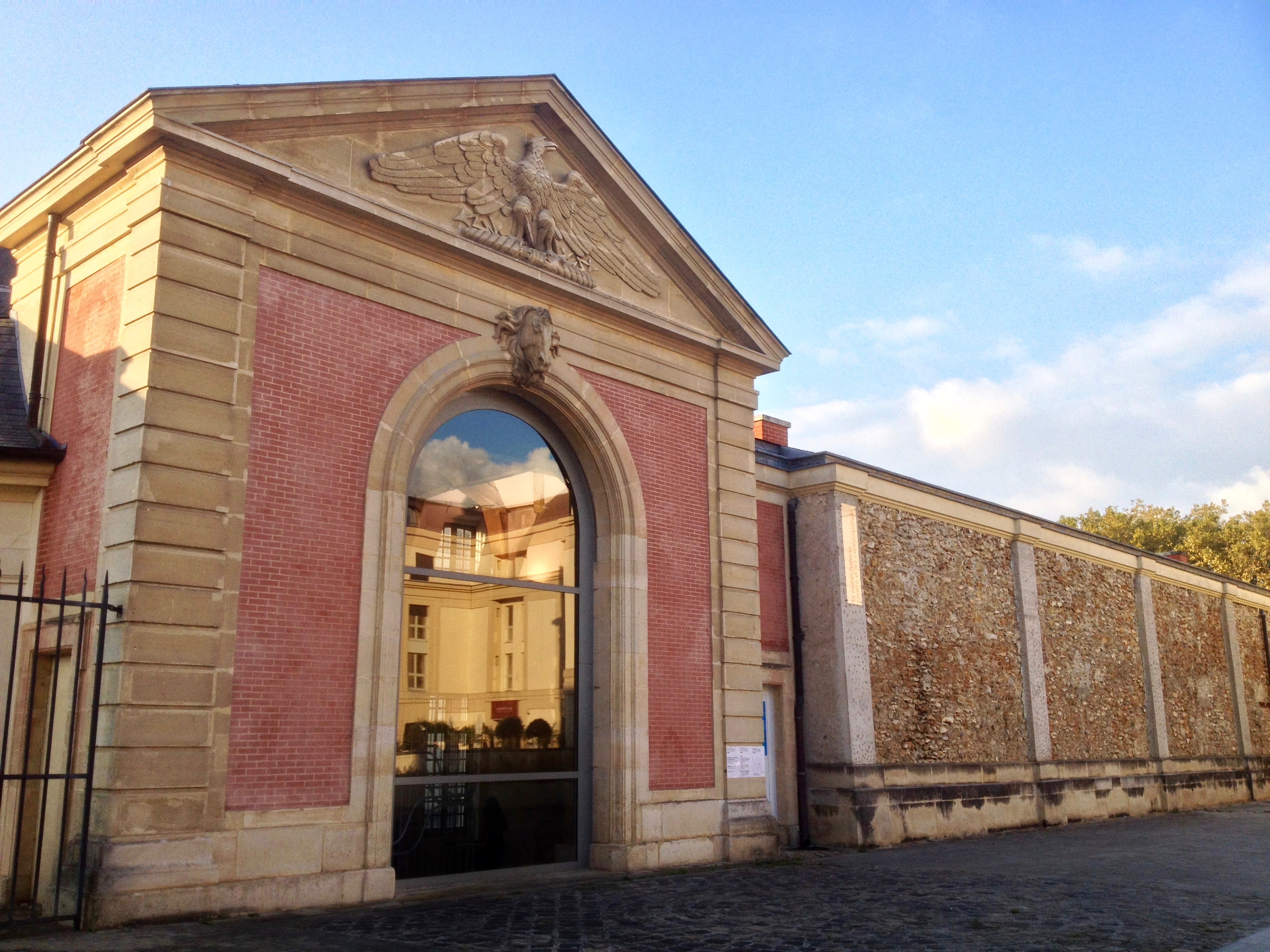
La Maréchalerie

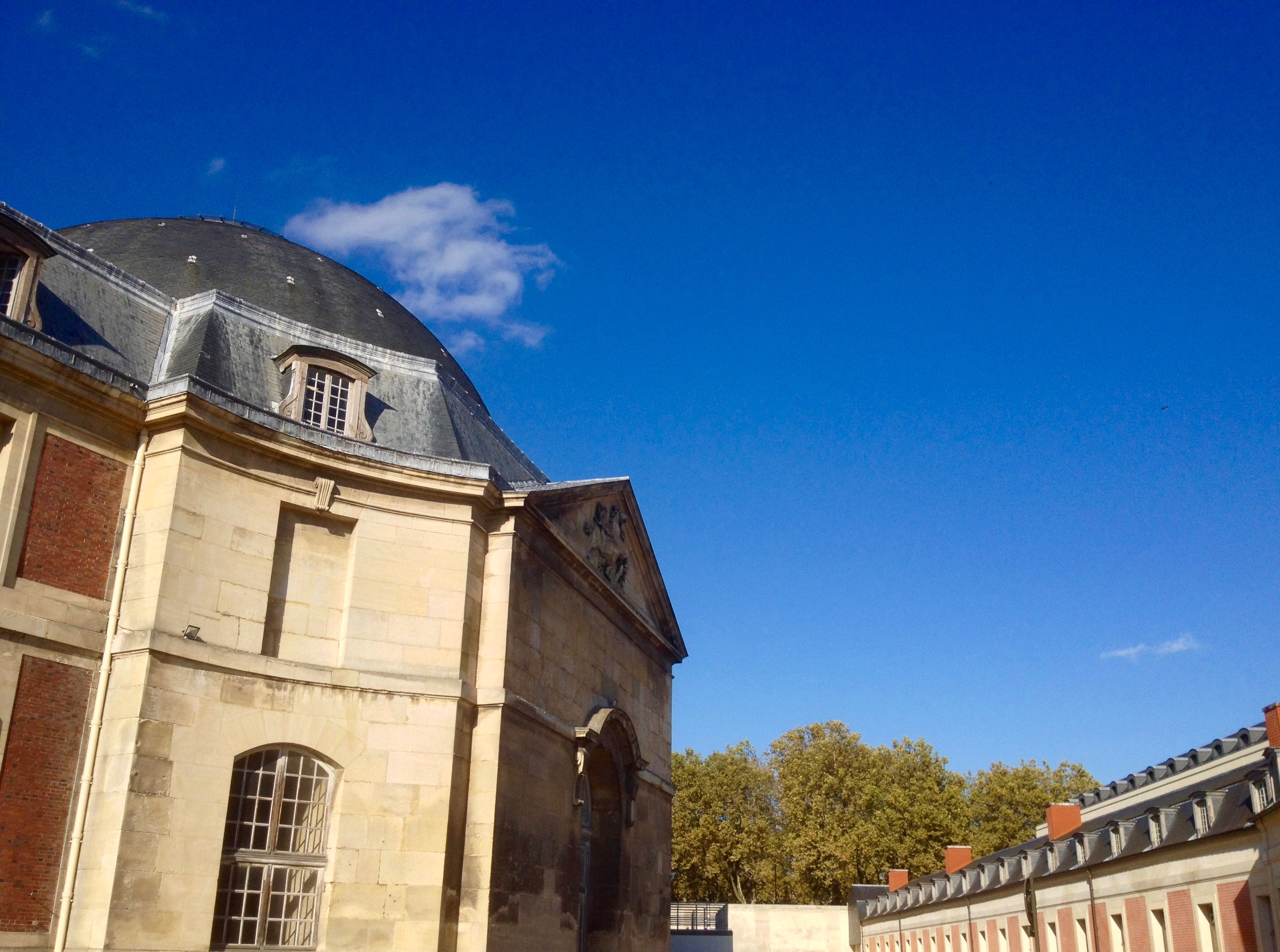
The Petite Écurie and La Maréchalerie

=== 20th and 21st centuries ===
By decree of September 16, 1929, the entire Petite Écurie was classified as a historic monument.

From 1935 to 1939, it was the barracks of the École de l'Air, along with the 134 Versailles air base.

Since 1969, it has housed the École nationale supérieure d'architecture de Versailles.

Between 1970 and 1973, a gypsothèque (a plaster cast collection), the Musée du Louvre's collection of antique casts, began to move in.

In 1988, La Maréchalerie was listed as a historic monument.

Since 1999, it has also housed the restoration workshops of the Centre for Research and Restoration of Museums of France.

==== La Maréchalerie, contemporary art center ====
In 2004, La Maréchalerie became a contemporary art center for the École nationale supérieure d'architecture de Versailles. It organizes several exhibitions a year.

==== Sculpture and molding gallery ====
Since 2012, the Petite Écurie has housed a gypsothèque, a collection of around 5,000 sculptures and casts based on ancient art (mainly Roman, since it wasn't until the eighteenth century that archaeologists began to take an active interest in Greece). These are the molding collections of the Louvre, the École des Beaux-Arts and the Institut d'art et d'archéologie de la Sorbonne. Under the direction of Louis XIV, Jean-Baptiste Colbert had required the boarders at the French Academy in Rome to copy ancient pieces, so that they could serve as inspiration for the sculptors at Versailles. In the 1930s, these casts were exhibited in the Louvre, on the landing of the Winged Victory of Samothrace staircase; today, it is inconceivable that a museum should present originals and casts on an equal footing. The plaster casts from the Beaux-arts, partly ransacked in May 68, have kept their original graffiti, as the authorities considered them part of the history of the works. The gypsothèque de la Petite Écurie was set up in the 1970s, but was previously closed to the public.

Since 2008, as part of the campaign to save the Palace's sculptures, several statues have been housed in the Galerie des Sculptures and replaced by copies:

- the statue of Latona in the Latona Fountain (2015)
- groups of sculptures in the Apollo's Baths Grove (2010)
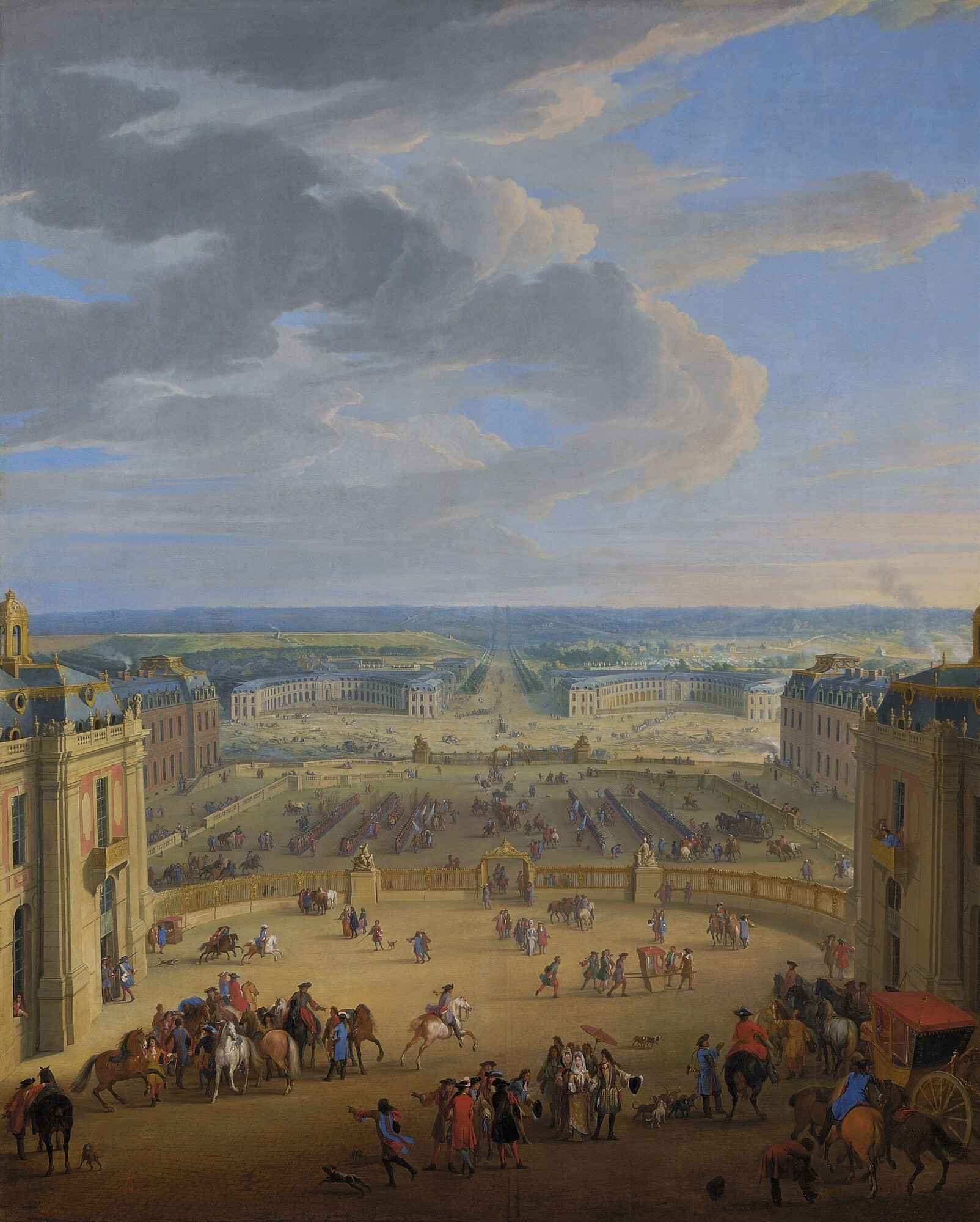
Perspective view of the Petite and Grande Écurie from the Place d'Armes in 1688.

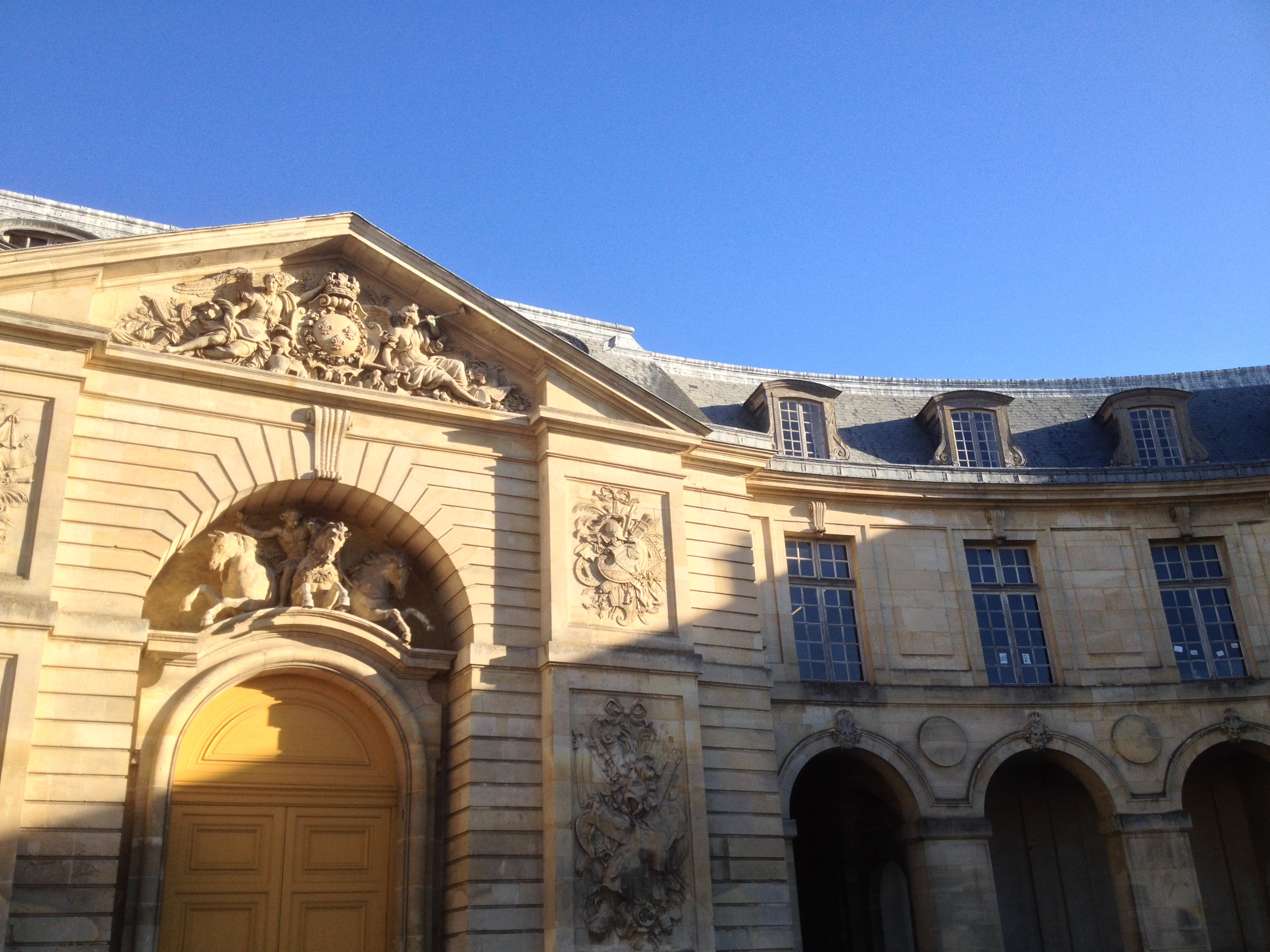
The façade of the Petite Écurie, entrance to the Sculpture Gallery.

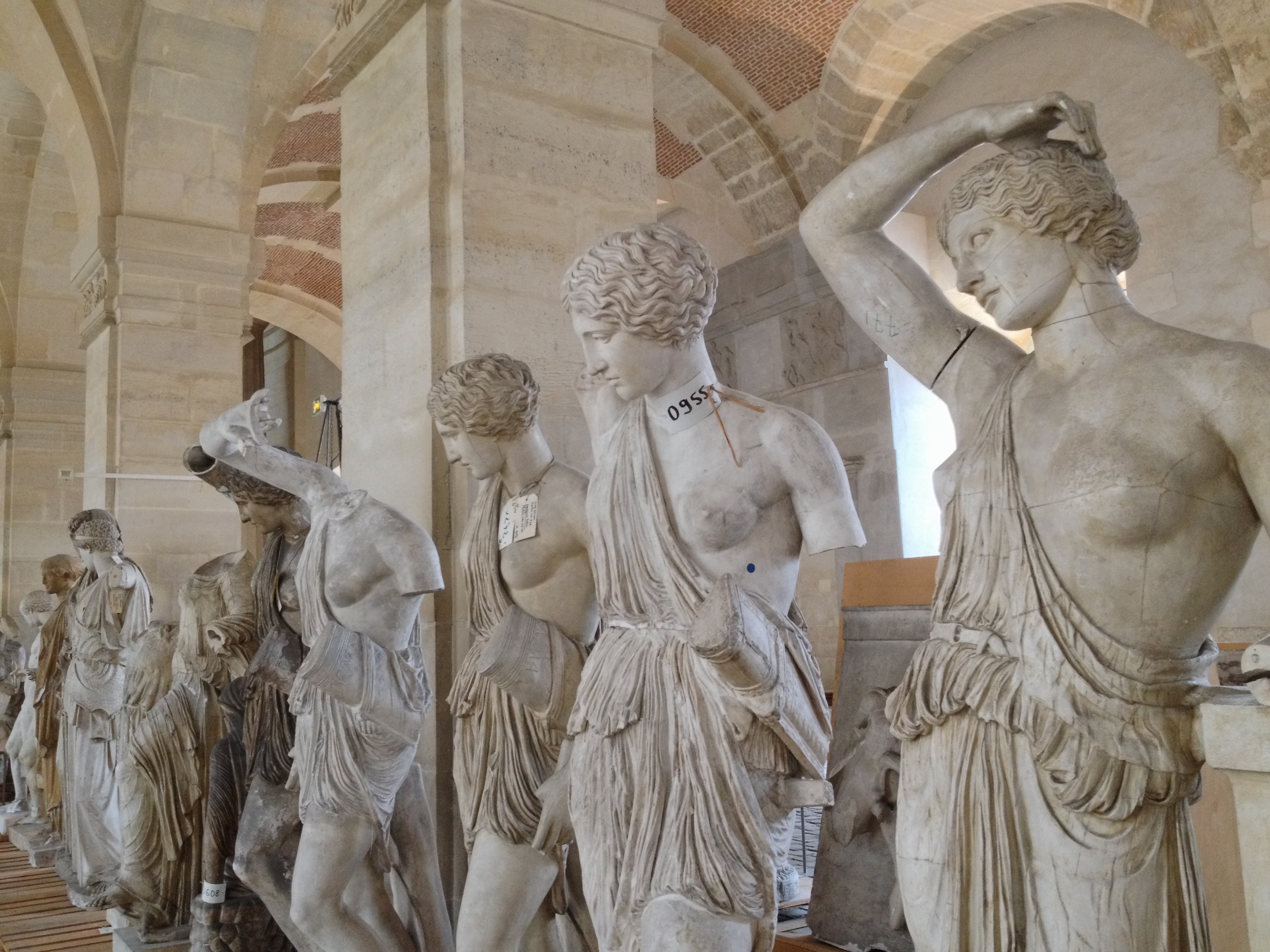
The Sculpture and Molding Gallery.

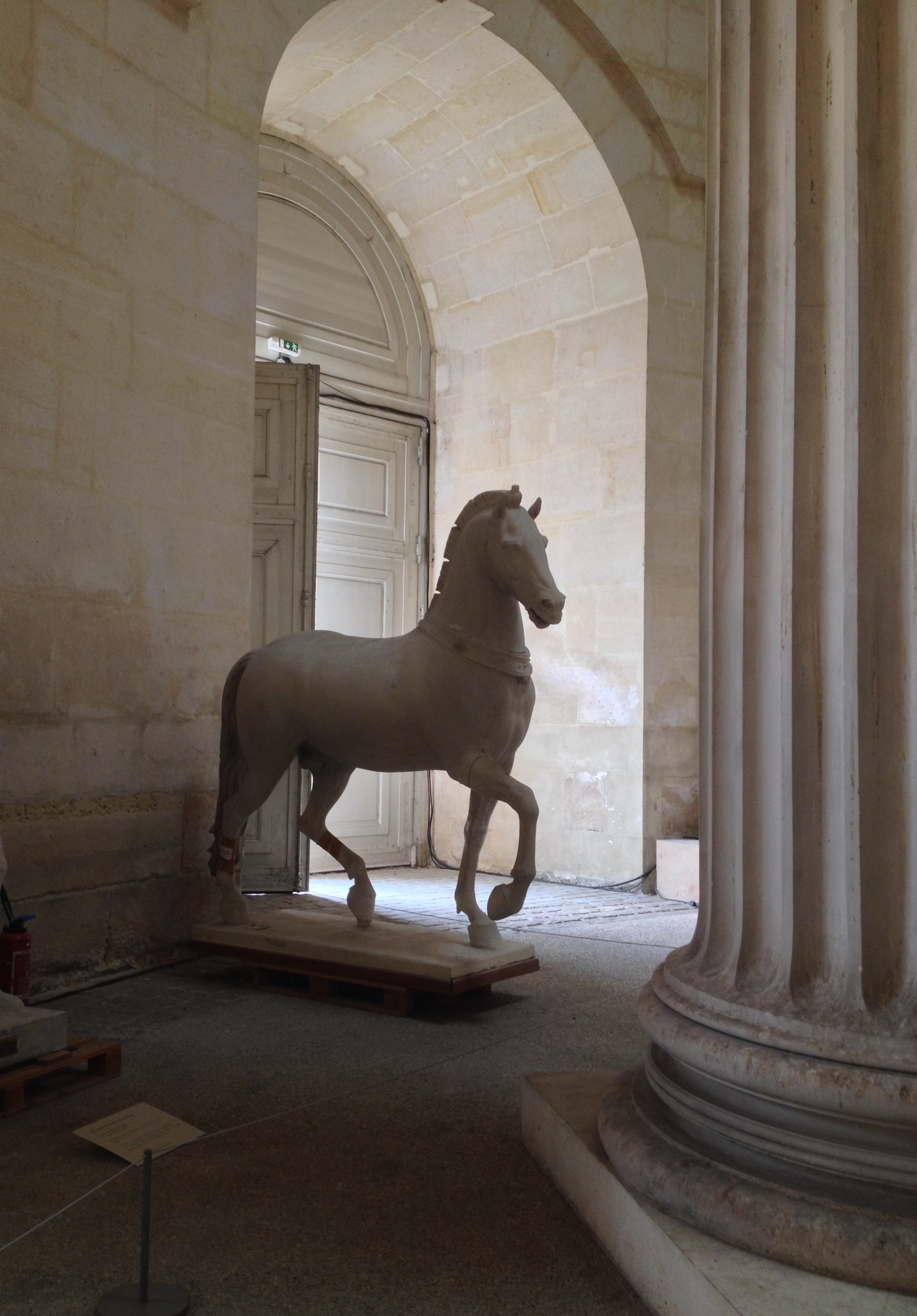
The Sculptures and Molding Gallery, at the foot of the rotunda.

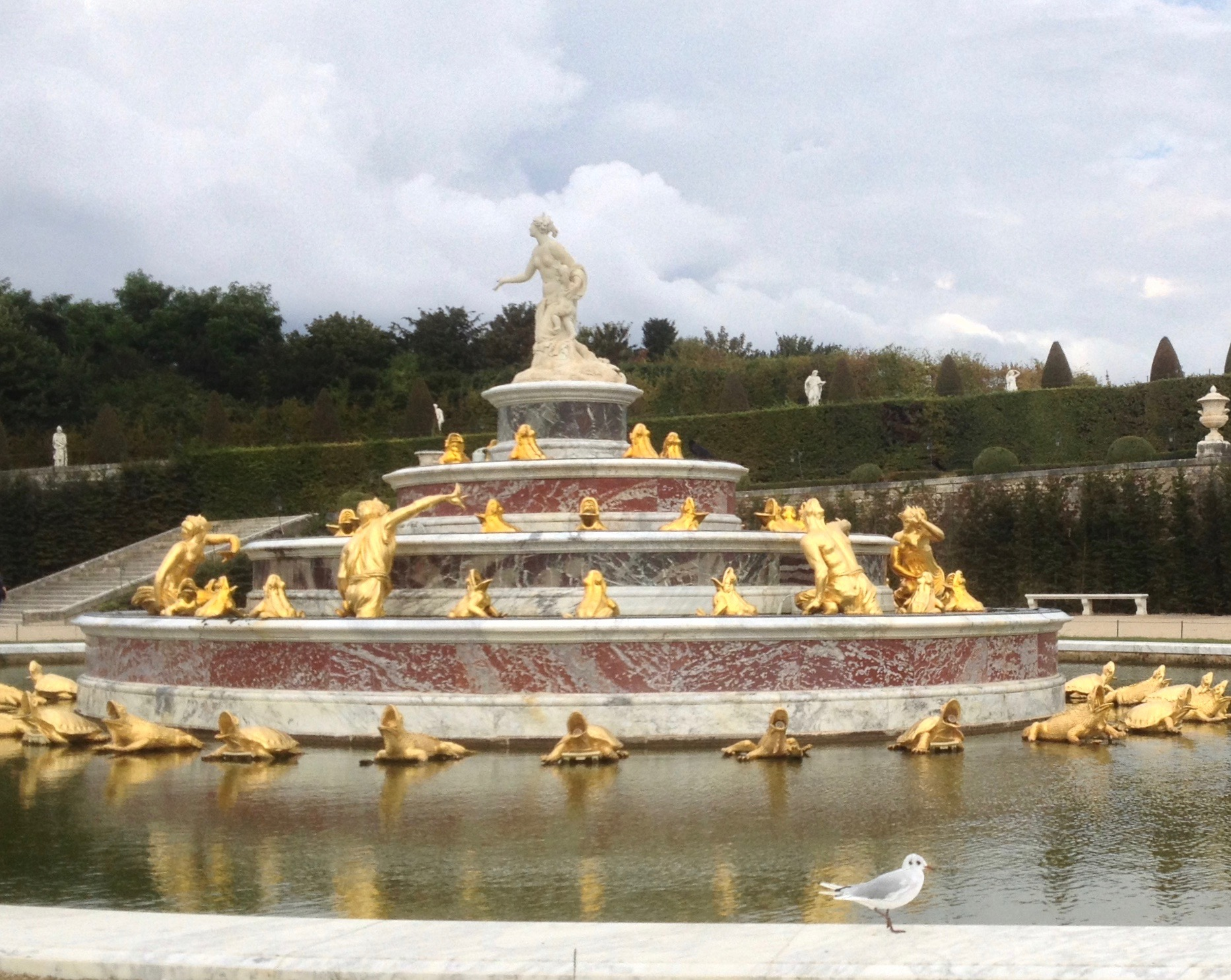
The Latona Fountain

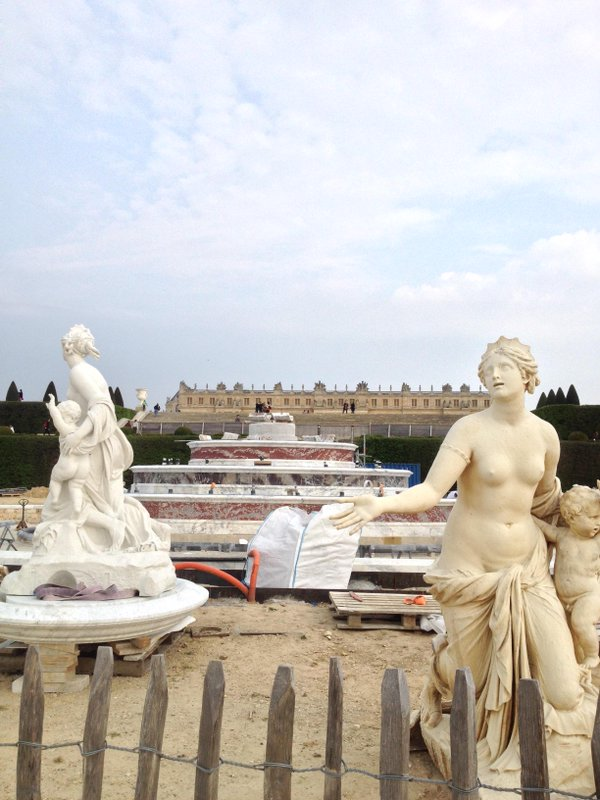
Copy of the Latona statue under construction

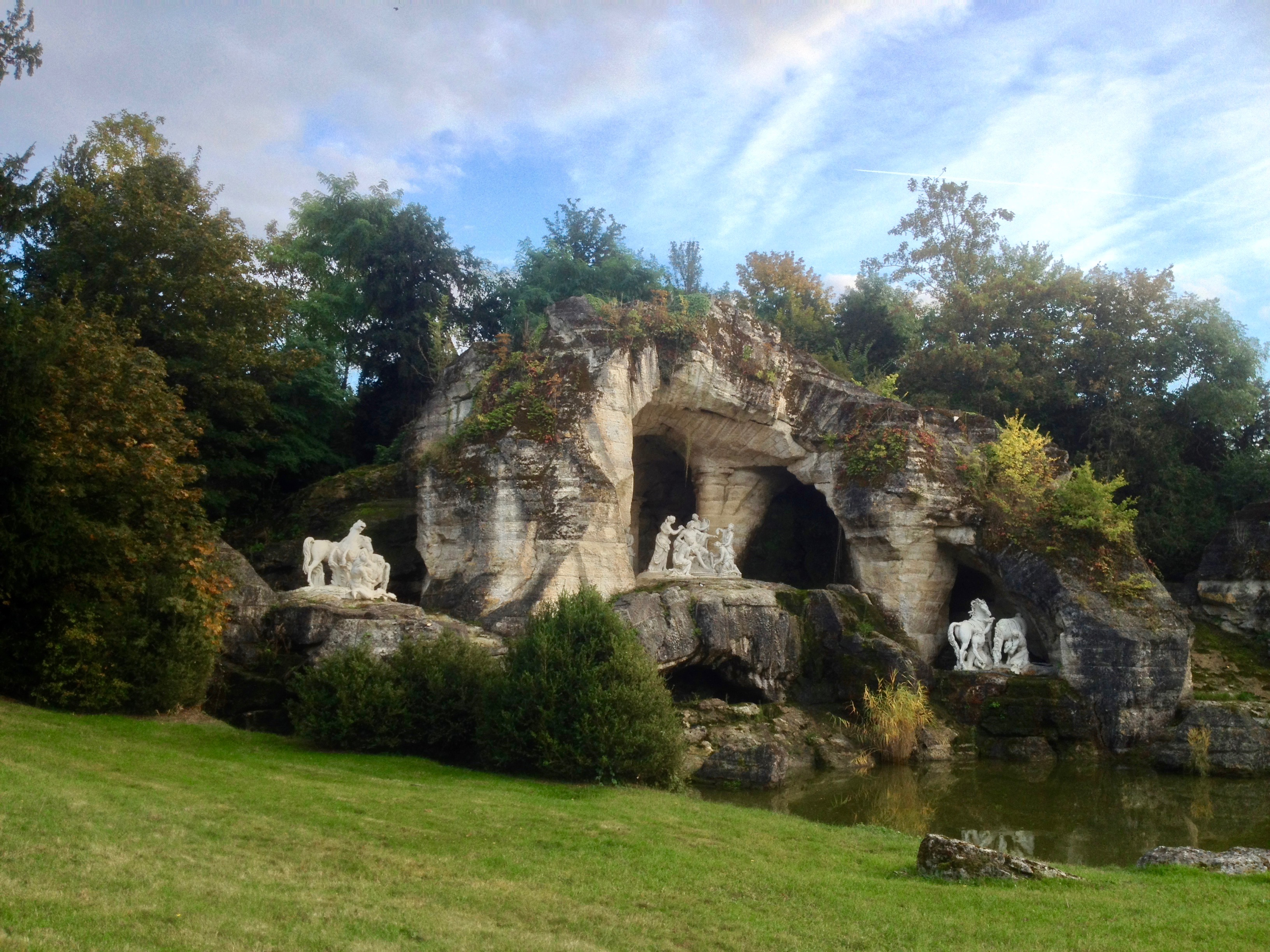
The Apollo's Baths Grove

== Architecture ==
- The buildings are organized around five courtyards:
  - the main courtyard, bordered by a hemicyclic colonnade and two symmetrical wings.
  - the two middle courtyards framed at the rear.
  - the two small side courtyards known as "manure courtyards".
- Behind the main gate, there was a circular riding arena under a large rotunda.
- The Grande Écurie had single galleries, while the Petite Écurie had double galleries separated by colonnades.
- The gallery ceilings are vaulted.
- The visible walls of the Palace are of stone, while the less visible walls are of red brick with stone facing.
- The upper storeys have rectangular windows and the attic has dormer windows.
- Sculptures are featured on the pediment, tympanum and jambs of the main portal.
- The side entrances face onto Avenue de Paris.

== See also ==
- Grande Écurie
- Palace of Versailles
