= Grande Écurie =

Historic building in Versailles, France

- Grande Écurie
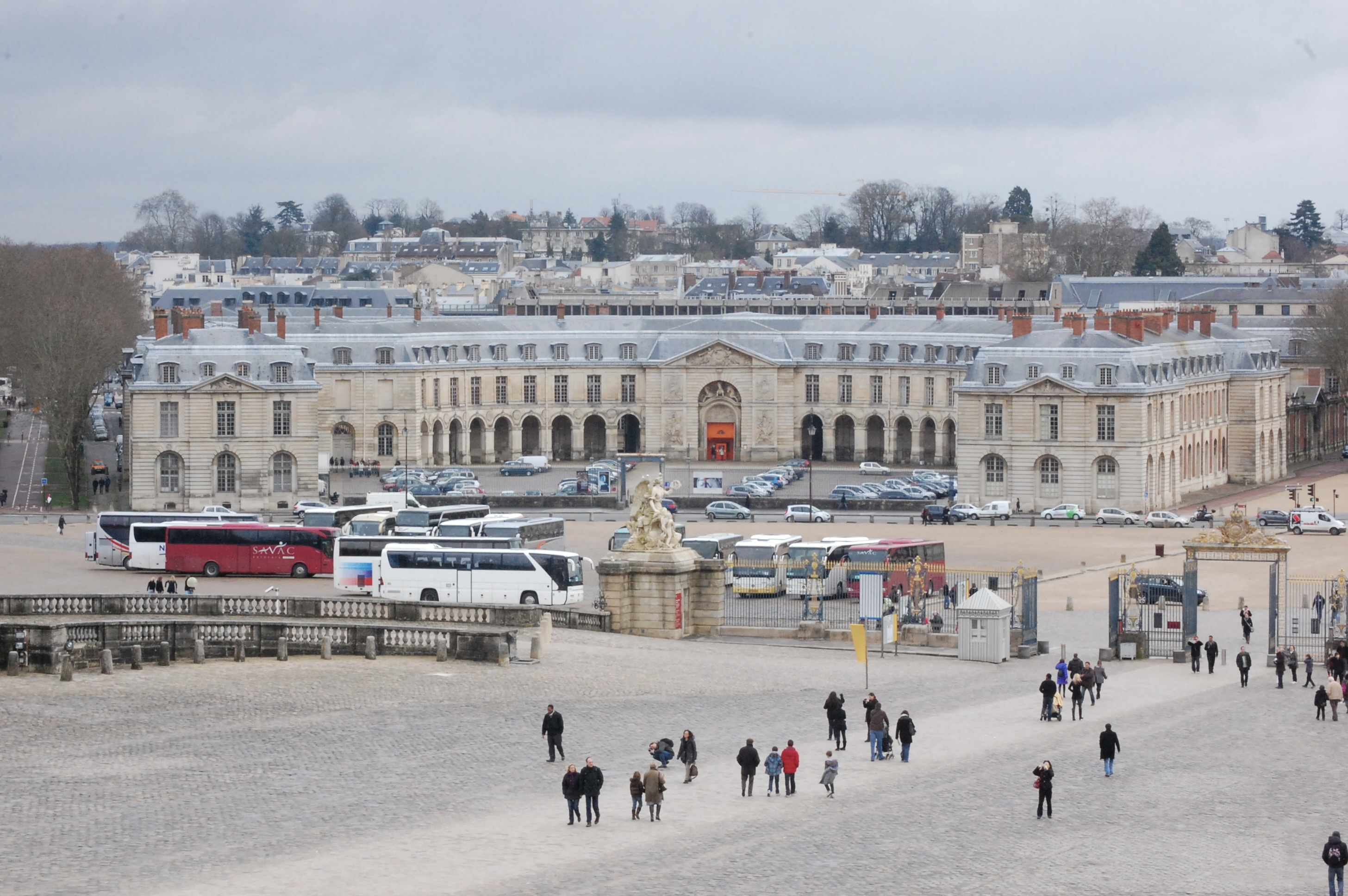
- The Grande Écurie at the Palace of Versailles, taken from the Pavillon Dufour.
- Interactive map of Grande Écurie
- Location: France, île de France, Yvelines, Versailles
- Coordinates: 48°48′14″N 2°7′42″E
- Designer: Jules Hardouin-Mansart
- Beginning date: 1682

The Grande Écurie (French pronunciation: [ɡʁɑ̃d ekyʁi], Great Stable) is a building located in Versailles (Yvelines), on the Place d'Armes, opposite the Palace, between the avenues of Saint-Cloud and Paris. Together with the Petite Écurie (literal French for "The Small Stable"), it formed the Royal Stables (an institution that employed around a thousand people (Note: Squires, pages, footmen, coachmen, grooms, blacksmiths, cartwrights, saddlers, doctors, surgeons, chaplains, musicians, etc) under Louis XIV), and was built under the direction of architect Jules Hardouin-Mansart and completed in 1682.

Equipped with a riding hall, it housed the king's hunting and war horses.

== History ==
The Grande Écurie replaced the King's stable, which then became the Queen's stable.

Identical to the Petite Écurie, from which it is separated by the Avenue de Paris, under the Old Regime, the Great Stable was under the orders of the Grand Squire of France and housed the school for the King's Pages. Between 1680 and 1830, the Grande Écurie was also home to the École de Versailles (literal French for "the Versailles School"), the cradle of French learned horsemanship.

Between 1793 and 1794, the emblem on the pediment was removed.

From 1854, the stables were occupied by the army.

By decree of 20 August 1913, the facades overlooking the main courtyard and the avenues of Paris and Saint-Cloud, the facades of the two pavilions, and the gates bordering the Place d'Armes were classified as historic monuments.

For the first time, the Palace of Versailles organized an international show jumping competition from 5 to 7 May 2017 in the courtyard of the Grande Écurie.

== Establishments housed at the Grande Écurie ==
- Galerie des Carrosses (Gallery of Coaches): In 1978, the museum was transferred from the Petit Trianon to the Grande Écurie. It was closed for expansion in 2006 and reopened in 2016.
- Equestrian Academy: in 2002, the Palace of Versailles returned these premises to their original function by choosing Bartabas, horseman and founder of the Zingaro equestrian show. The architect Patrick Bouchain was commissioned to refurbish the rectangular riding arena, where the Académie Équestre Nationale du Domaine de Versailles was inaugurated in 2003.
- Versailles municipal archives.
- From 1957 to 2003: Department archives of Yvelines.
- From 2024, a campus for arts and crafts will be created here in partnership with ENSAD.

== Architecture ==
The buildings are arranged around five courtyards:

- The main courtyard, bordered by a semi-circular colonnade and two symmetrical wings.
- The two middle courtyards framed at the rear.
- The two small side courtyards known as the "manure courtyards".

Behind the main gate, there was a rectangular riding arena, which is now home to the Académie Équestre Nationale du Domaine de Versailles.

The galleries are single in the Great Stable, while the Small Stable has double galleries separated by colonnades. The ceilings of the galleries are vaulted.

The visible walls of the Palace are made of stone, while the less visible walls are made of red brick with stone facing.

The building has rectangular windows on the first floor and dormer windows in the attic.

Sculptures can be seen on the pediment, tympanum, and jambs of the main gate.

Side entrances look out onto Avenue de Saint-Cloud and Avenue de Paris.

In 2016, to mark the reopening of the Gallery of Coaches, the "King's Stable" sign was installed on the gate.

== Gallery ==
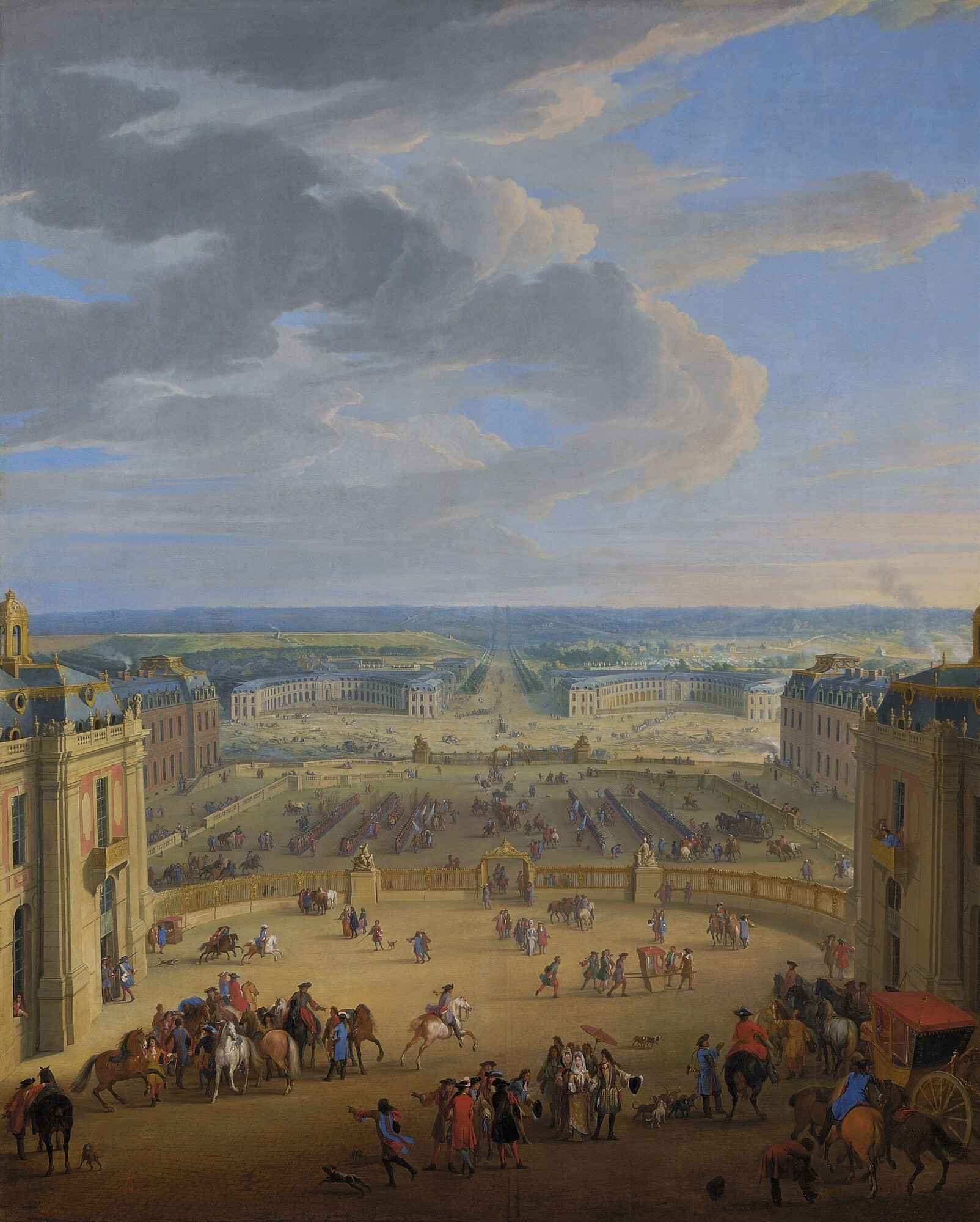
Perspective view of the Petite and Grande Écurie from the Place d'Armes in 1688.

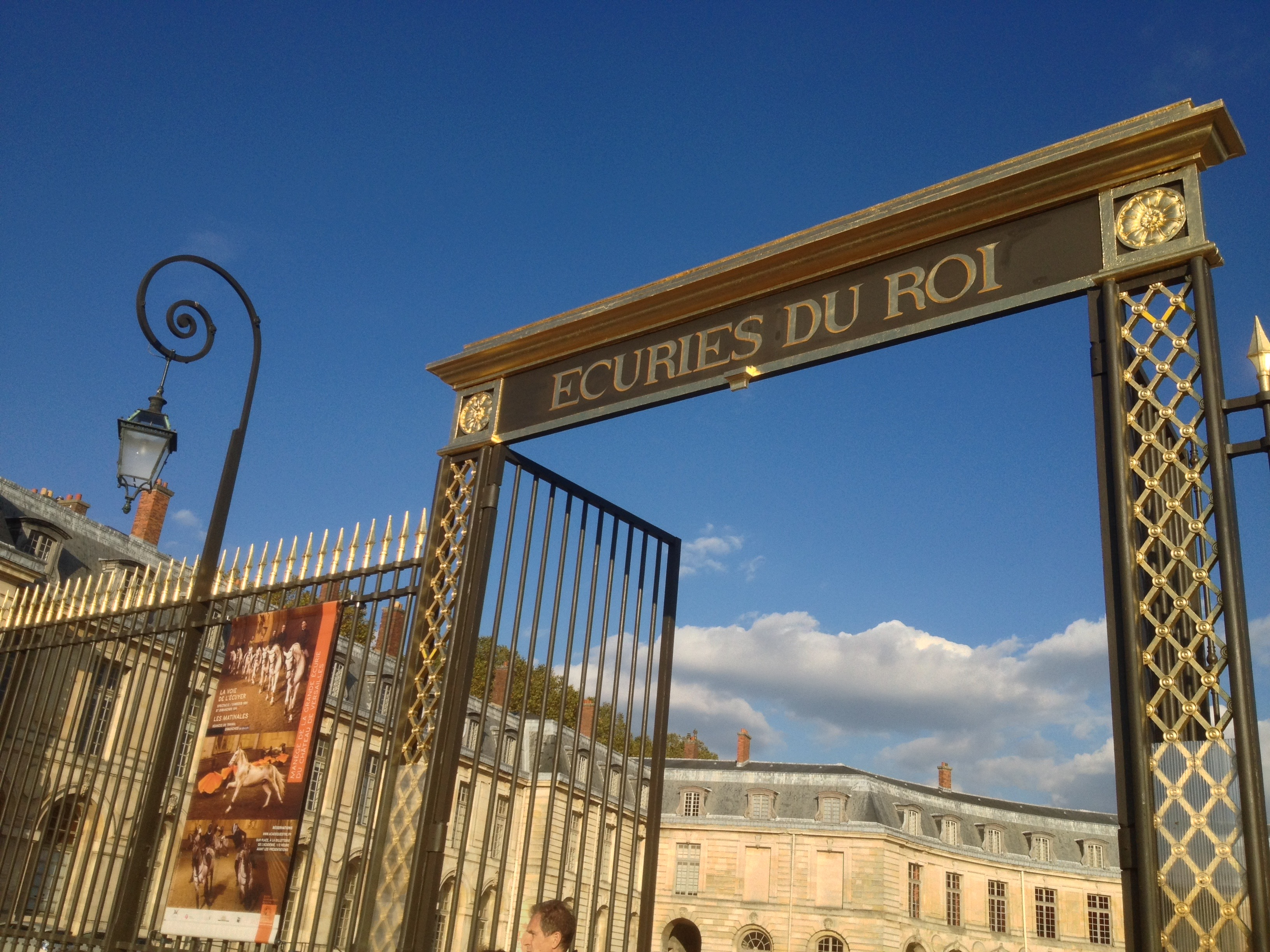
The "King's Stables" gate.

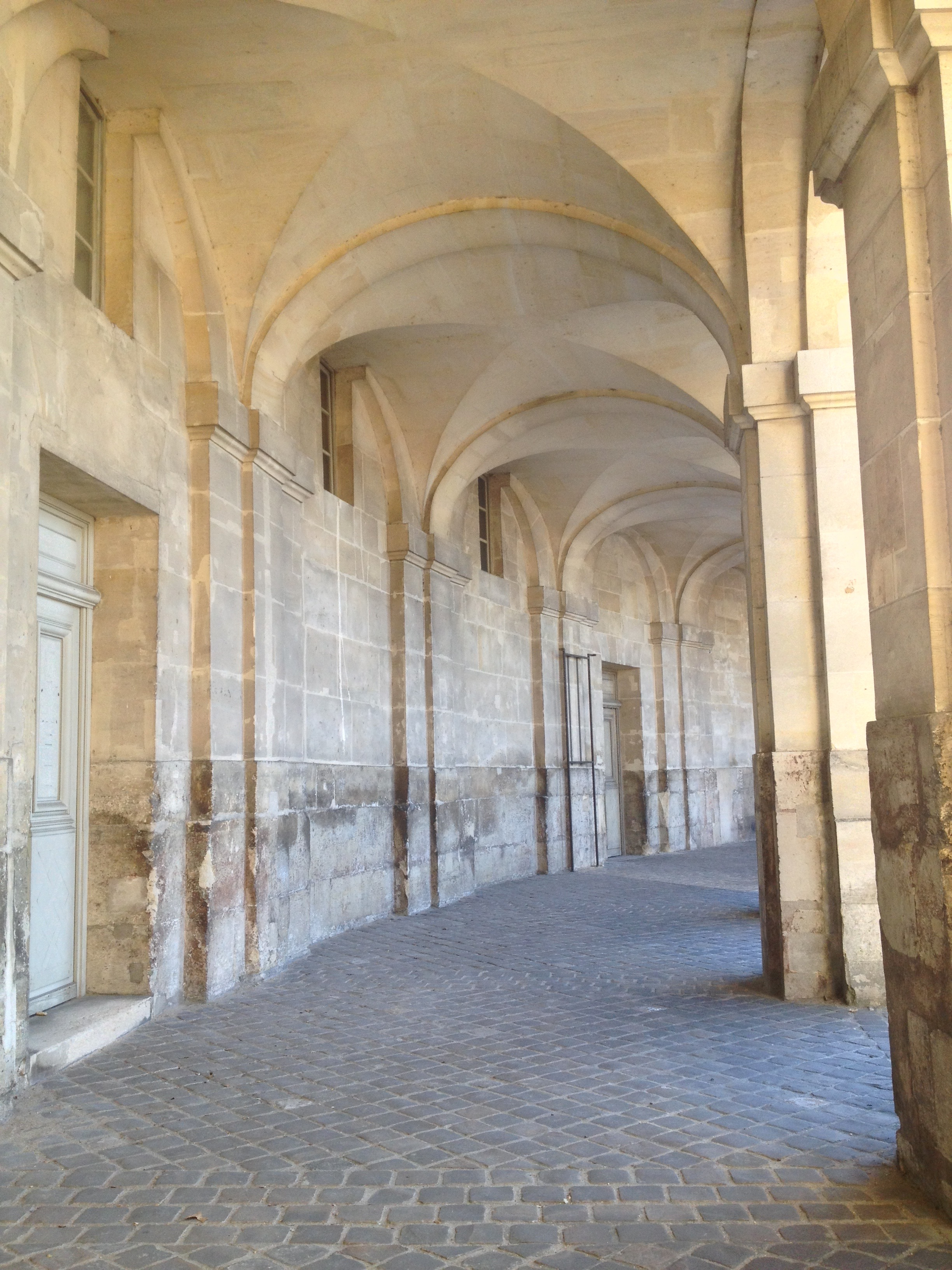
The colonnade.

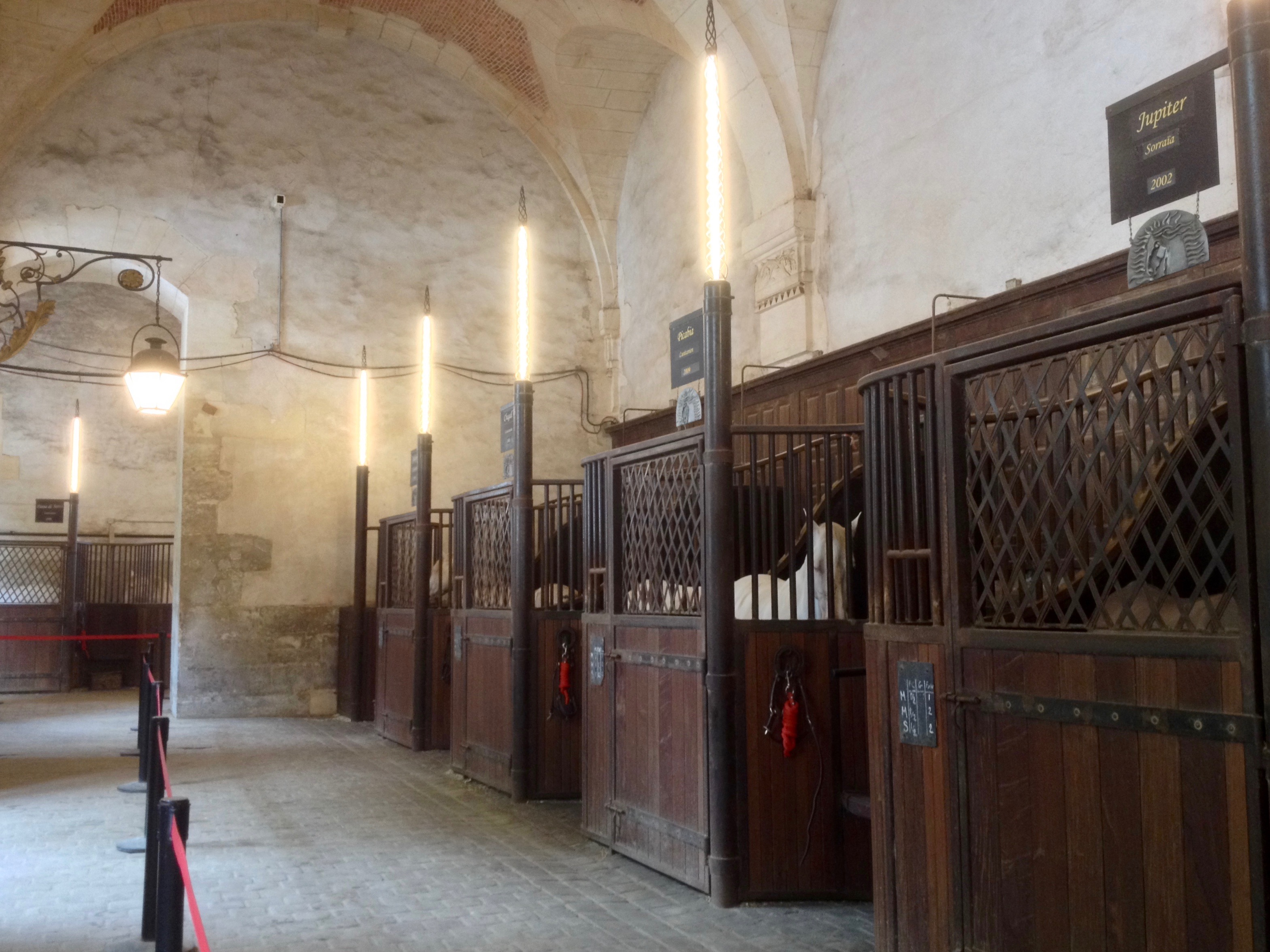
The stable of the Versailles Equestrian Academy.

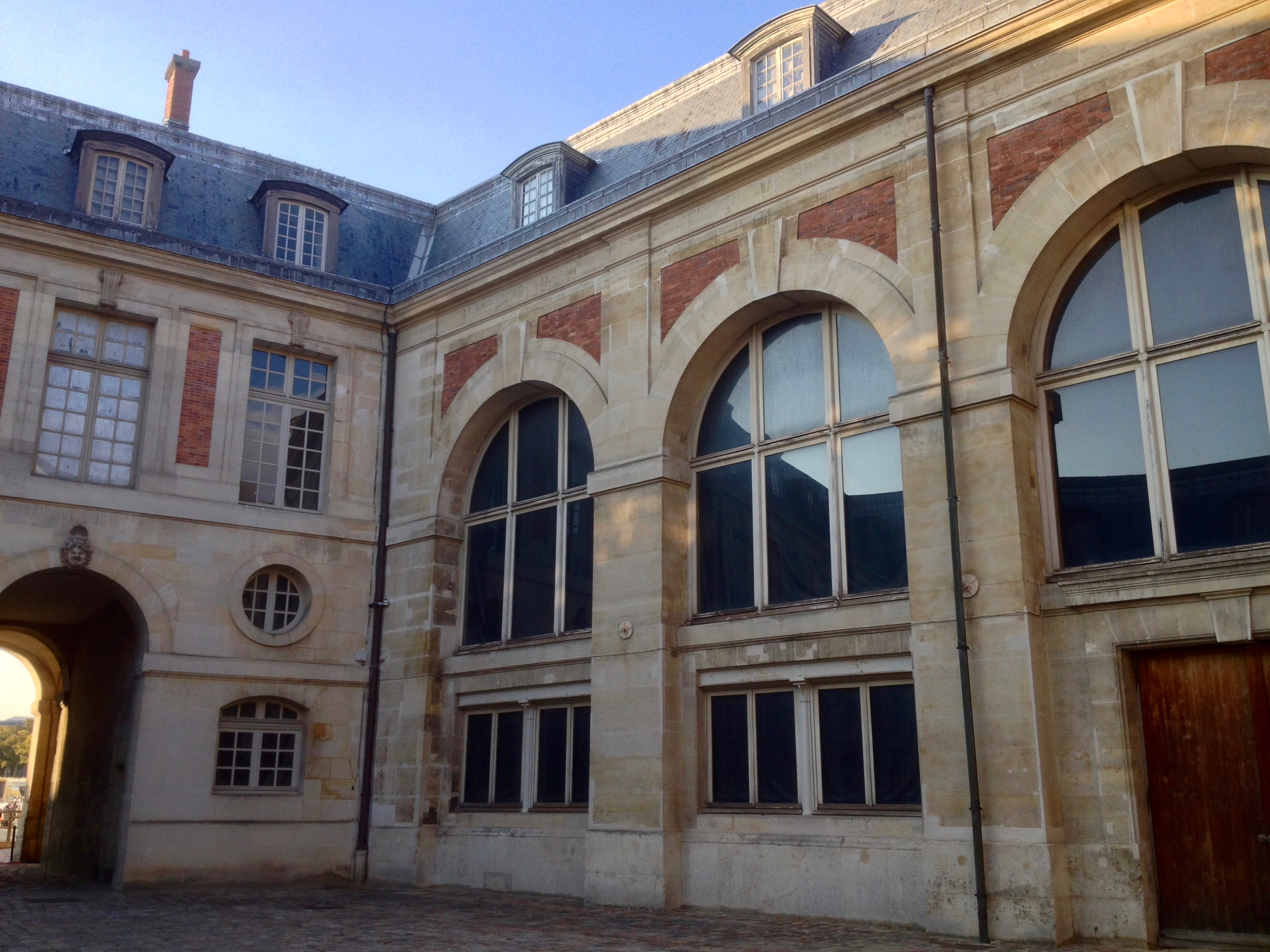
One of the courtyards at the rear.

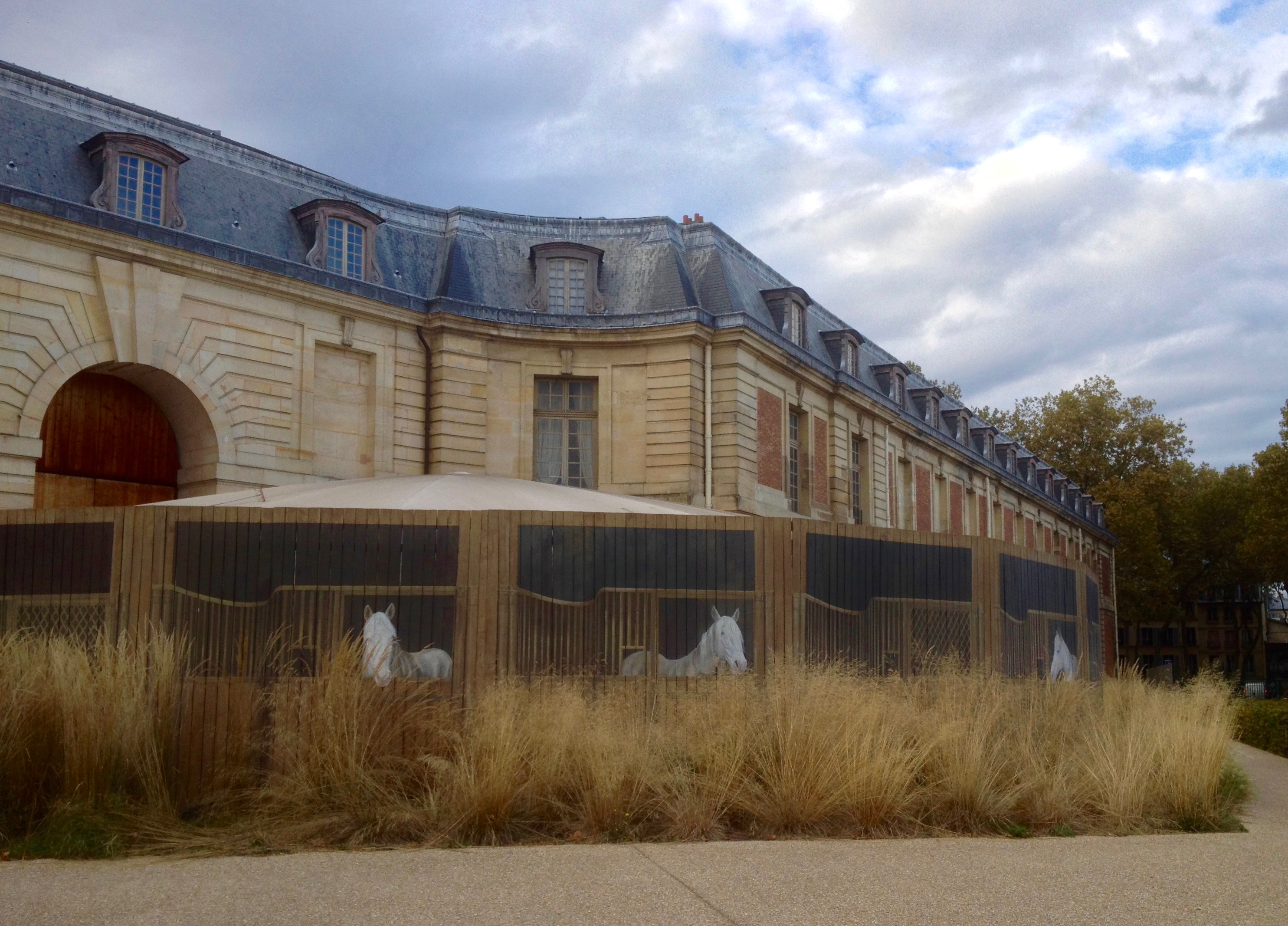
Behind the theatre of the Equestrian Academy, The trompe-l'œil

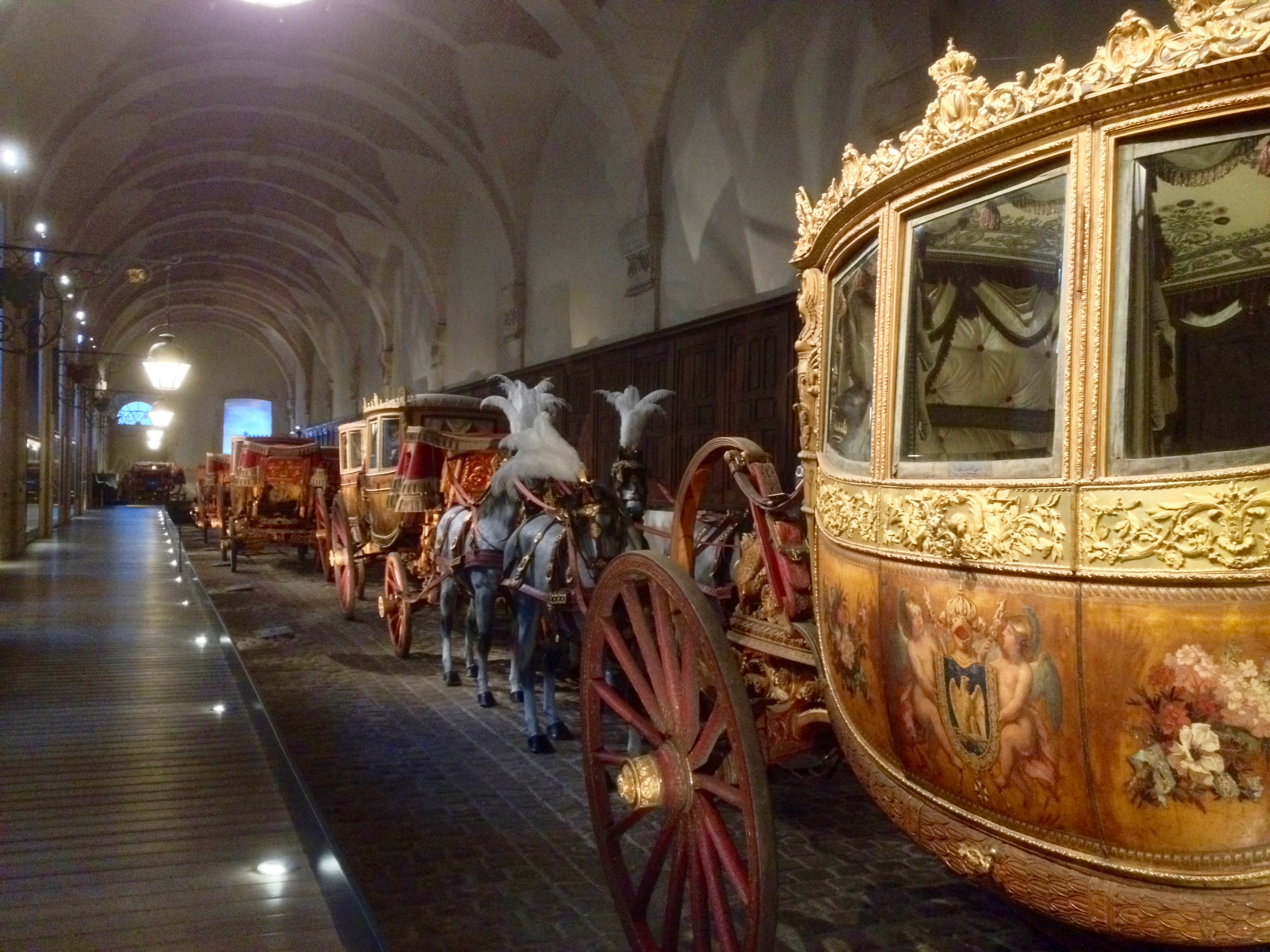
The gallery of coaches

== The Grande Écurie in culture ==
- La Mission, volume 7 of the comic book series L'Épervier by Patrice Pellerin published by Soleil, 2009

== Notes ==
1. Squires, pages, footmen, coachmen, grooms, blacksmiths, cartwrights, saddlers, doctors, surgeons, chaplains, musicians, etc

== Bibliography ==
- Édouard de Barthélemy (2023). Les grands écuyers et la grande écurie de France (128 pages (nouvelle édition d'après l'édition originale de 1868) ed.). Nantes: A. de la Pinsonnais éditeur. ISBN 978-2494653085.
- Félix de France d'Hézecques (1998). Souvenirs d'un page de la cour de Louis XVI ((réimpr de l'éd. de Paris, Didier, 1873) ed.). Paris: G. Monfort. pp. IV-360.
- Gaston de Carné (1886). Les Pages des écuries du roi, l'école des pages. Nantes: M. Pinsonnays. pp. XI-207.
- François Bluche (1966). Les Pages de la Grande Écurie (3rd ed.). Paris: Les Cahiers nobles. pp. 28–30.
- Hélène Delalex (2016). La Galerie des Carrosses, Château de Versailles. Artlys.
- Lucien Bély (dir.) (2015). Dictionnaire Louis XIV (coll. "Bouquins" ed.). Paris: éditions Robert Laffont. p. 1405. ISBN 978-2-221-12482-6.
