= Equestrian Show Academy =

Equestrian facility in France

- Académie équestre nationale du Domaine de Versailles (French)
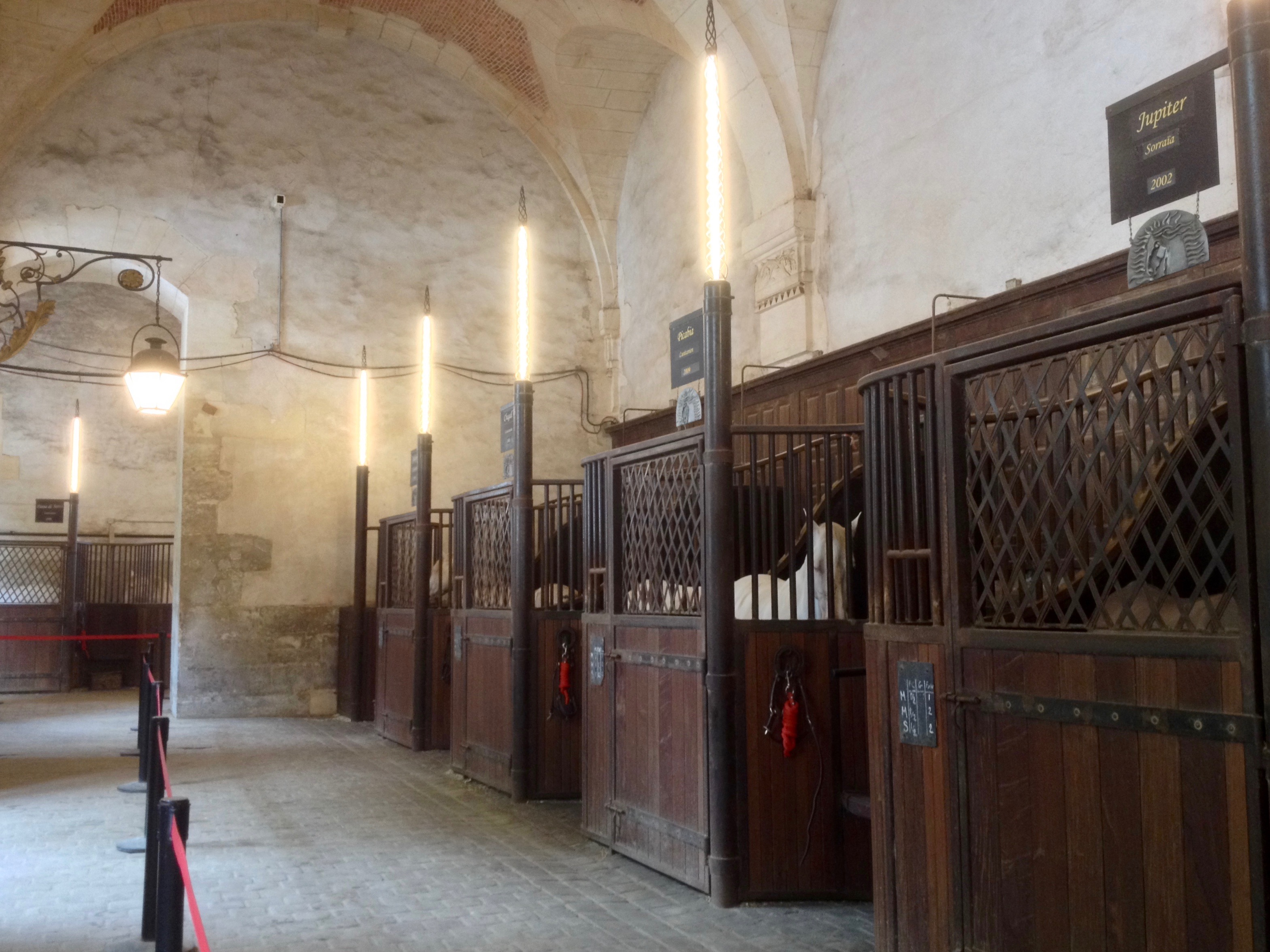
- The academy's stable

- Location within Île-de-France (region)
- 48°48′14″N 2°07′42″E
- Location: Versailles, Yvelines; France

History
- Built: 1679

Site notes
- Architect: Jules Hardouin-Mansart
- Architectural style: Classicism
- Restored: 2002
- Restored by: Patrick Bouchain

Monument historique
- Original purpose: Royal stable
- Current purpose: High equestrian education center, school/company
- Address: Avenue Rockefeller, Versailles, France

Monument historique
- Country: France
- Website: https://www.bartabas.fr/academie-equestre-de-versailles/?lang=en

The Equestrian Show Academy (French: Académie Equestre Nationale du Domaine de Versailles) is an equestrian facility located in Versailles, in the Grande Écurie.

== History ==
In 2002, the Palace of Versailles returned these premises to their original function, choosing Bartabas to revive the Grande Écurie. Created in 2003 by Bartabas in the Grande Écurie of the Palace of Versailles, the Equestrian Show Academy is an innovation in the field of performing arts and is intended as a higher education establishment. Its mission is to pass on the knowledge and skills involved in writing equestrian shows, by combining various artistic disciplines. The originality of this equestrian art academy lies in the fact that it combines Haute École dressage work with other disciplines such as fencing, dancing, singing and traditional Kyudo (Japanese archery).

In the Grande Écurie at the Palace of Versailles, the Academy presents a number of shows, including La Voie de l'Écuyer, choreographed by Bartabas and a reflection of this school/company, as well as Les coulisses de l'Académie and Les Visites du patrimoine. The Académie is also at the service of original creations, for example, the Grand Palais in Paris, the Saint-Ouen Abbey in Rouen, and the Ancient Theater of Fourvière. Every weekend, the riders present their repertoire in La Voie de l'Écuyer's show. This show includes the Lusitano carousel, sorraïas with long reins, fencing on horseback and equestrian improvisations to chords by Johann Sebastian Bach.

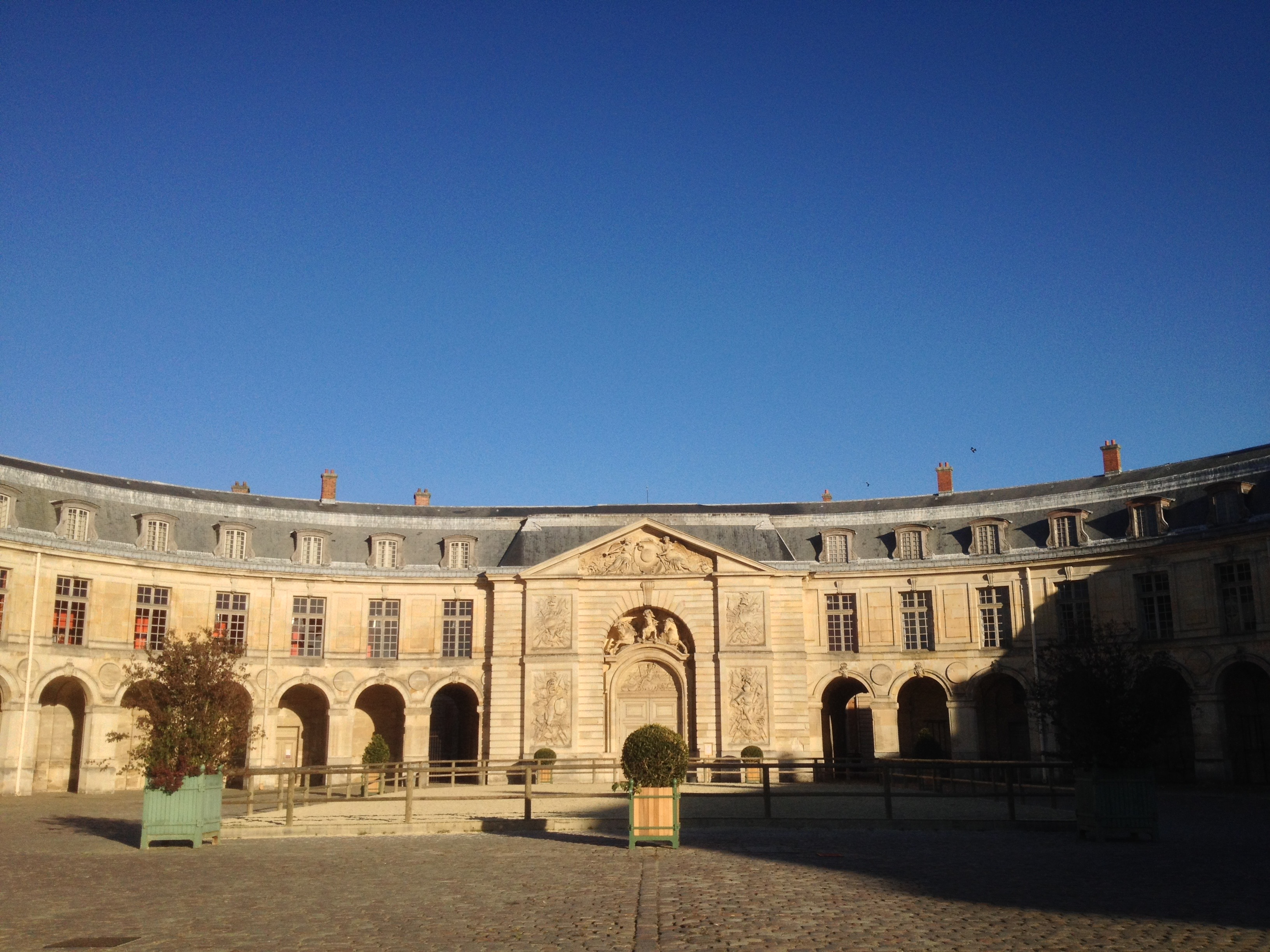
the Grande Écurie, the riding school in the Great Court

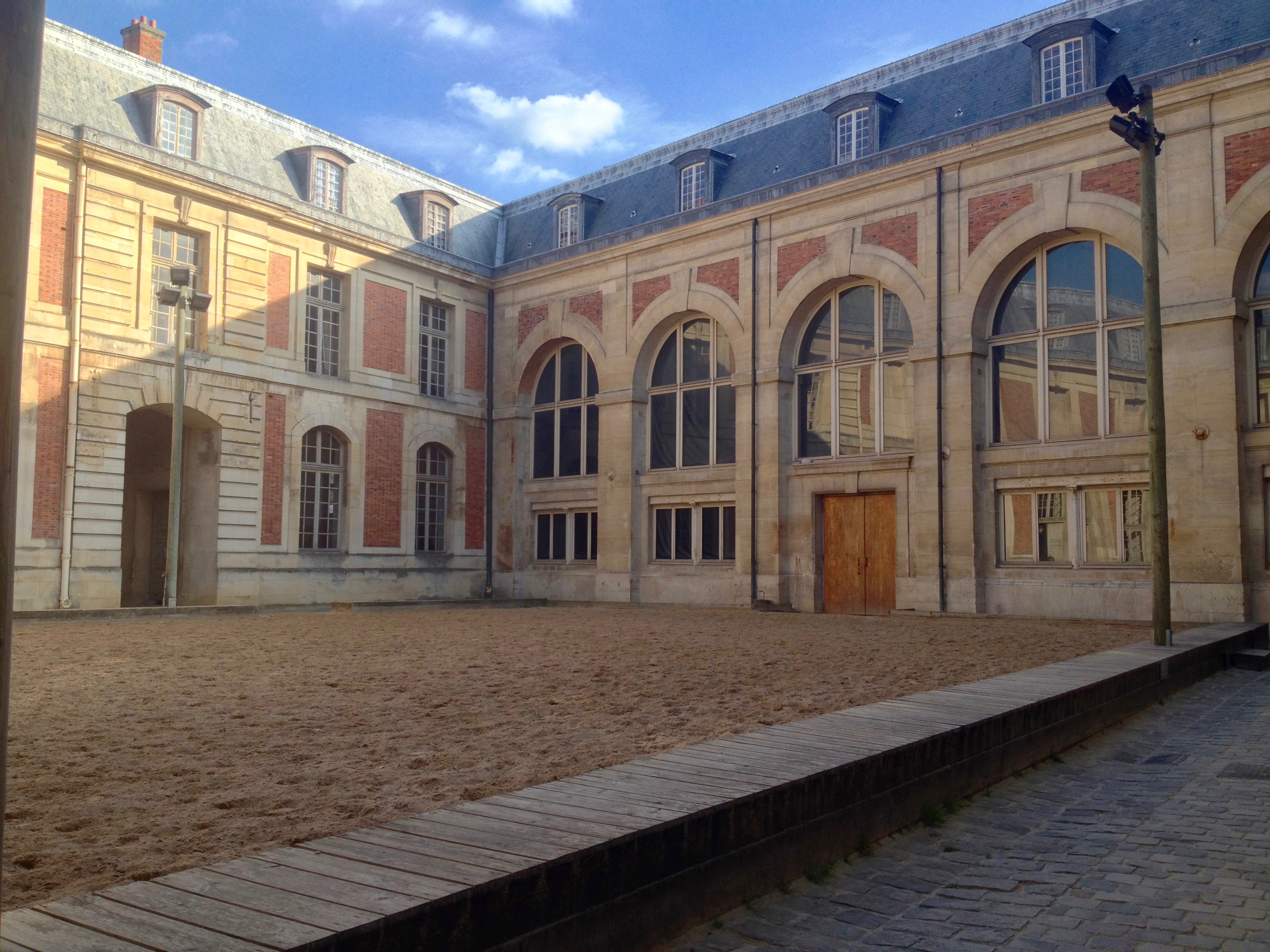
the riding school of the court, in the back, the Grande Écurie

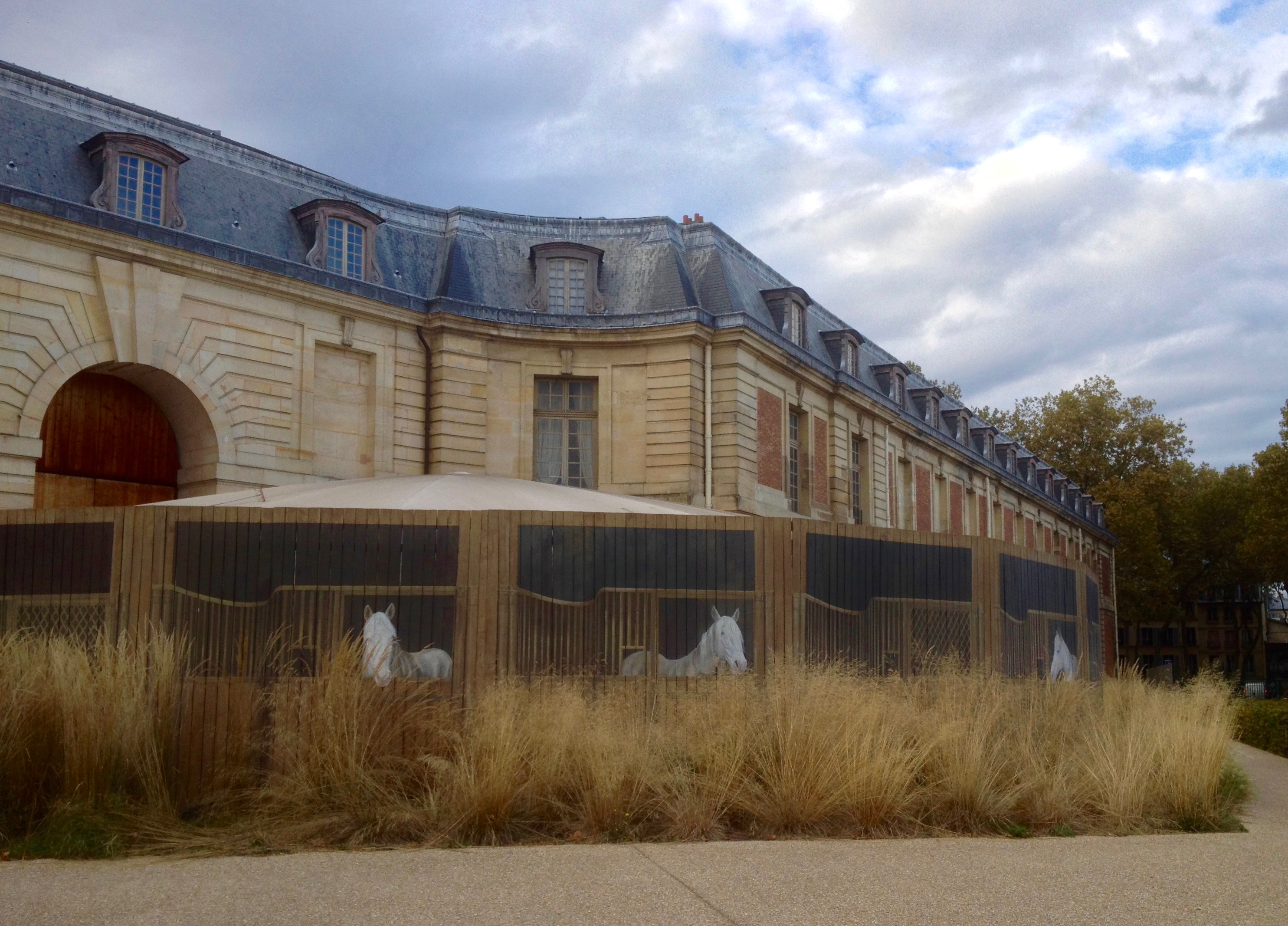
Behind the theater, a backstage hidden by trompe l'oeil

== The king's Grande Écurie ==
The historic site was built by Jules Hardouin-Mansart in the late 17th century to house the royal cavalry. In collaboration with the Palace and Monuments Historique's departments, Bartabas commissioned Patrick Bouchain to restore the Grande Écurie. The riding arena was designed as a theatrical set, with a nod to the Hall of Mirrors, Murano glass chandeliers and mirrors in which horses and riders are reflected. The light, mobile architecture was inspired by Parma's Farnese Theatre. Opposite the tiered seating, decorated with baskets, the golden sand track occupies two-thirds of the surface. The stables have been designed to take into account the harmony of volumes, the constraints of the Academy's operations and Bartabas' requirements for the well-being of the horses. New stalls have replaced the old ones. The vertical lights are twisted, in contemporary reference to unicorns.

== The Versailles Equestrian Academy ==
Created in 2003 by Bartabas within the Grande Écurie, the Equestrian Show Academy of Versailles is a corps de ballet unique in the world. Founded as much on the art of transmission as on the art of performance, daily teaching here combines Haute École dressage with various disciplines such as fencing, dance, singing and Kyudo (Japanese archery). In this way, the equestrians develop a genuine sensitivity that is put at the service of a very singular repertoire, dedicated to the public, thus perpetuating the transmission of a light-hearted equitation in the French tradition. The Academy is also dedicated to original creations, choreographed by Bartabas, in France and abroad.

"I imagined a company-school, a creative laboratory, where the notion of collective work is strongly defended. For me, there can be no transmission of equestrian knowledge without the development of an artistic sensibility. That's why, here, learning dressage is combined with the practice of dance, singing, artistic fencing or Kyudo. It's all about treating horsemanship as an art, not a discipline."

— Bartabas

It is performing at Versailles in the purpose-built riding arena, as well as on French and international stages, with its own repertory shows. Bartabas collaborates with artists such as Carolyn Carlson and Marc Minkowski.

== See also ==
- Bartabas
