= Avenue de Sceaux =

Thoroughfare in Versailles, France

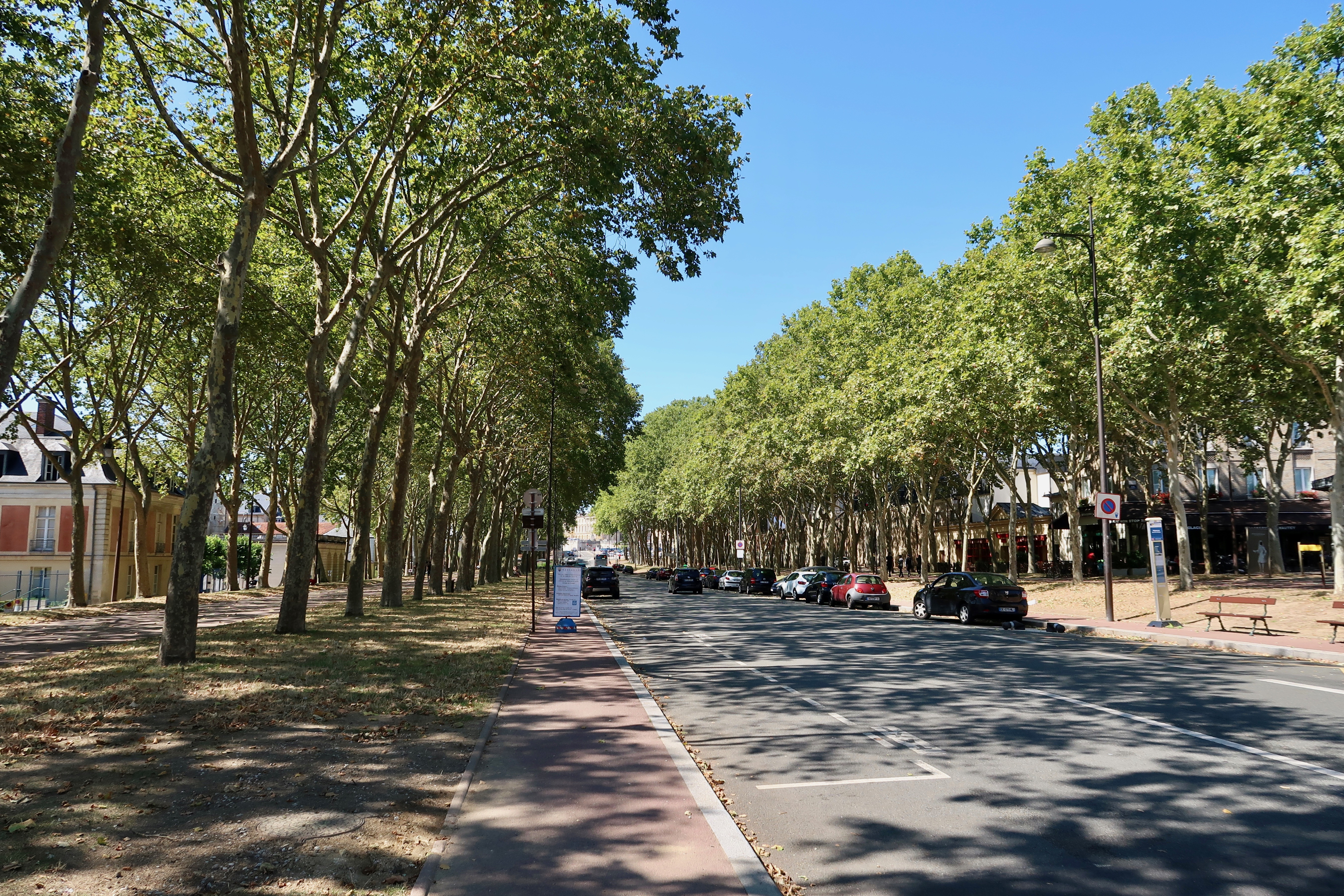

- Location within France
- Length: 700 m (2,300 ft)
- Location: Versailles; France
- Coordinates: 48°47′52″N 2°07′46″E
- North end: Place d'Armes
- South-East end: Square des Francine

Construction
- Completion: 2nd half of the 18th century

The Avenue de Sceaux is a thoroughfare in Versailles, France.

== Location and access ==
The Avenue de Sceaux is one of three avenues that fan out from Place d'Armes, in front of the Palace of Versailles, along with Avenue de Paris and Avenue de Saint-Cloud. Avenue de Sceaux is the southernmost of the three. It runs south-east for around 700 m, ending at the Square des Francine.

Part of the avenue is currently occupied by an overhead pay parking lot managed by the city of Versailles. This has been in high demand since the temporary closure of the Versailles-Chantiers station parking lot in 2015 as part of the work on the multimodal interchange hub. There are also pay and display parking spaces along the entire length of the lane.

== Name origin/history ==
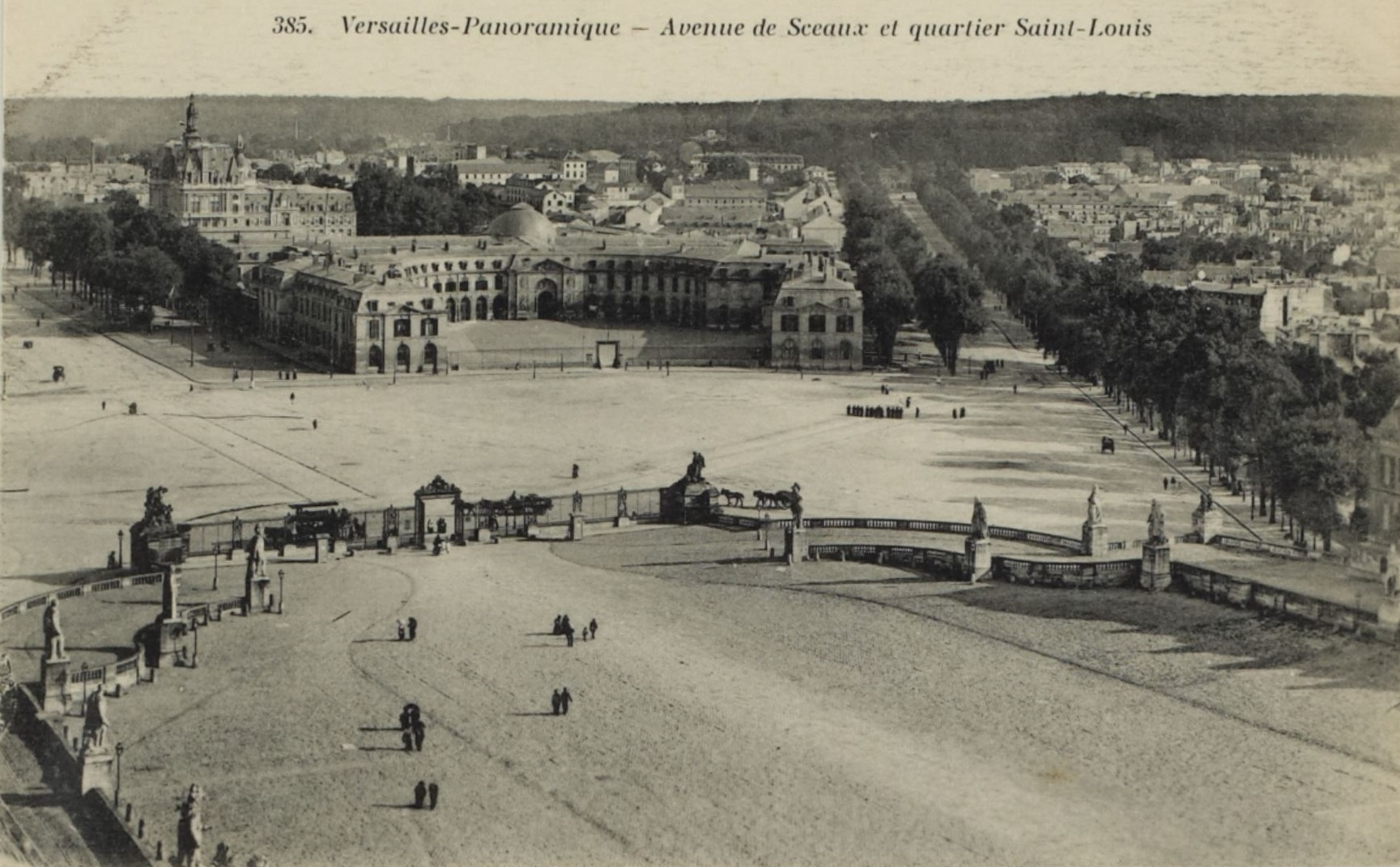
Panoramic view of Avenue de Sceaux and the Saint-Louis district (early 20th-century postcard).

Initially, the plan was to extend the avenue de Sceaux to the south-east, so that the Palace of Fontainebleau could be reached via the town of Sceaux. But the project was aborted, and the avenue remained as it was, ending in a dead end The project was thwarted by the installation of two huge reservoirs in the Bois Saint Martin by engineer Gobert to receive water from the Buc aqueduct. Located at the end of the avenue, they closed it off for good.

== Remarkable buildings and places of remembrance ==
The Avenue de Sceaux borders the following buildings:

- Petite Écurie;
- Cour des Senteurs;
- Square des Francine, also known as abreuvoir Louis XIV;
- No.10: Hôtel de la Marine et des Galères;
- Jardin des étangs Gobert.
