= Avenue de Saint-Cloud (Versailles) =

Thoroughfare in Versailles, France

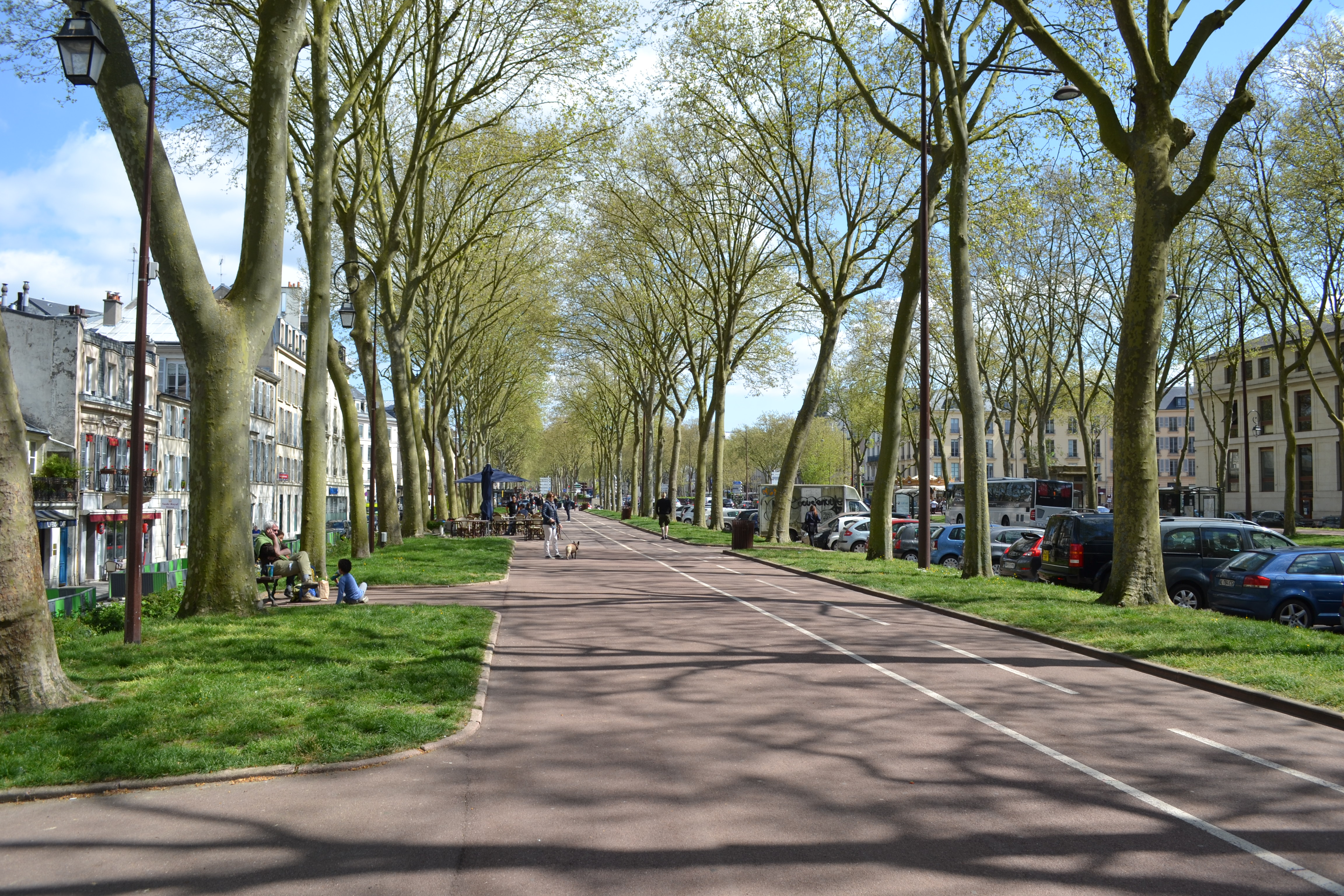

- Location within France
- Length: 1 km (0.62 mi)
- Location: Versailles; France
- Coordinates: 48°48′19″N 2°08′10″E
- North end: Place d'Armes
- East end: Avenue des États Unis

Construction
- Completion: 2nd half of the 17th century

The Avenue de Saint-Cloud is a thoroughfare in Versailles, France.

== Location and access ==
Avenue de Saint-Cloud is one of three avenues that fan out from Place d'Armes, in front of the Château de Versailles, along with Avenue de Paris and Avenue de Sceaux. Avenue de Saint-Cloud is the northernmost of the three. Heading east-northeast, it ends at the carrefour de Montreuil, at the Place Alexandre-Ier-de-Yougoslavie. Avenue des États-Unis extends it beyond the Montreuil crossroads, bending slightly to the north. It is 1,025 metres long and 78 metres wide. Medians planted with two rows of plane trees and equipped with bicycle paths separate the central traffic lanes from the two counter-alleys.

== Buildings ==
- Grande Écurie;
- No. 50 and 50 bis: building;
- No. 52, 52 bis and 52 ter: buildings;
- No. 73: lycée Hoche (public high school in Versailles);
- No. 83: building.

== Name origin ==
The avenue owes its name to the fact that it runs towards the town of Saint-Cloud. In 1665, it was called Avenue de Paris. In 1793, it was renamed Avenue de l'Orient, before reverting to its former name in 1806.

== Historical background ==
A menagerie and stables occupied the site of today's Lycée Hoche during the reign of Louis XIV. The Café Amaury, where the founders of the Club Breton met in 1789, was located at the corner of Avenue de Saint-Cloud and today's Rue Carnot. In 1963, a new thoroughfare was created between Avenue de Paris and Avenue de Saint-Cloud, in place of an artillery barracks. The public treasury and the central post office, as well as a parking lot, were also built here. The new thoroughfare was named Avenue de l'Europe.

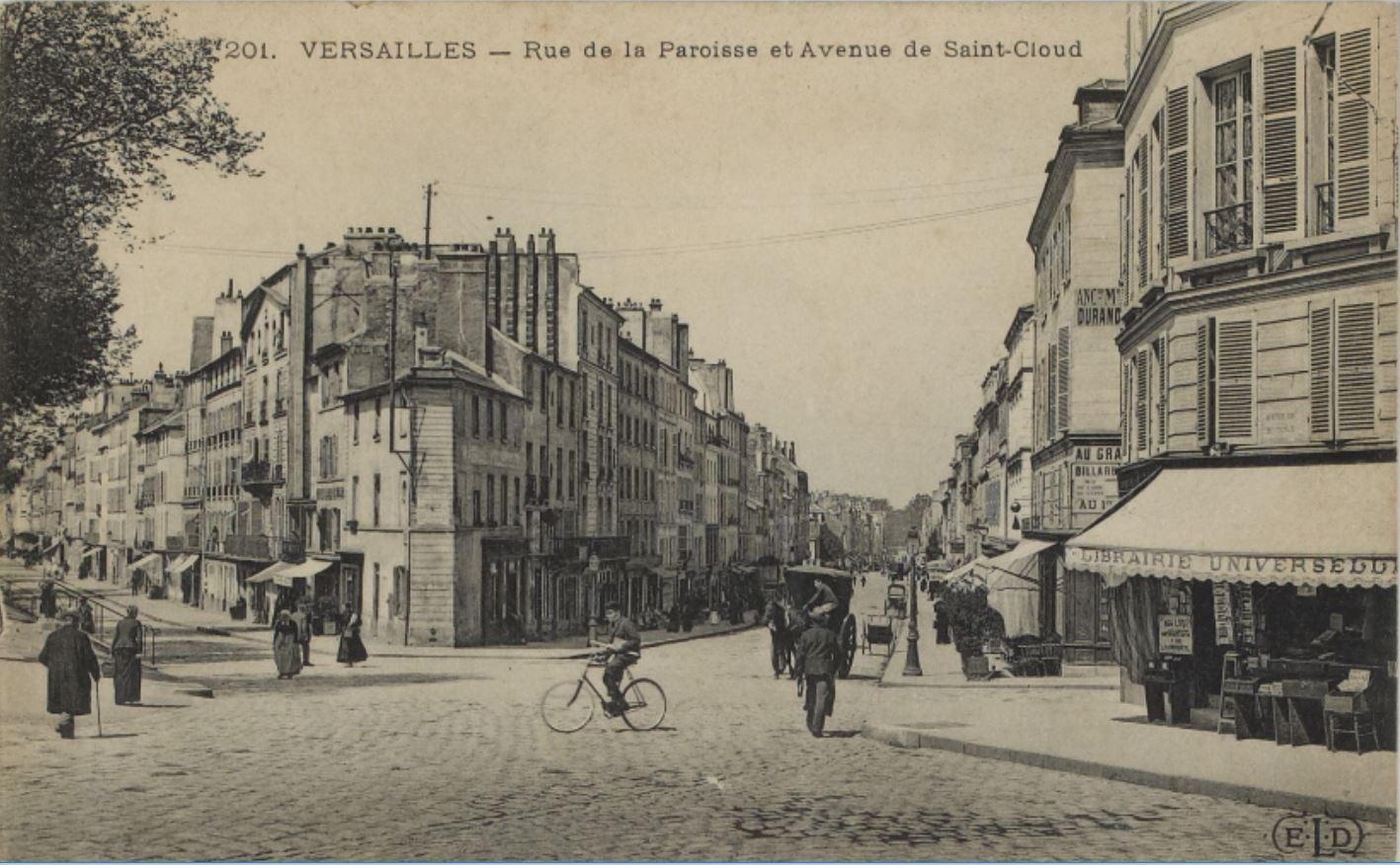
Crossroads between avenue de Saint-Cloud and Rue de la Paroisse at the beginning of the 20th century.

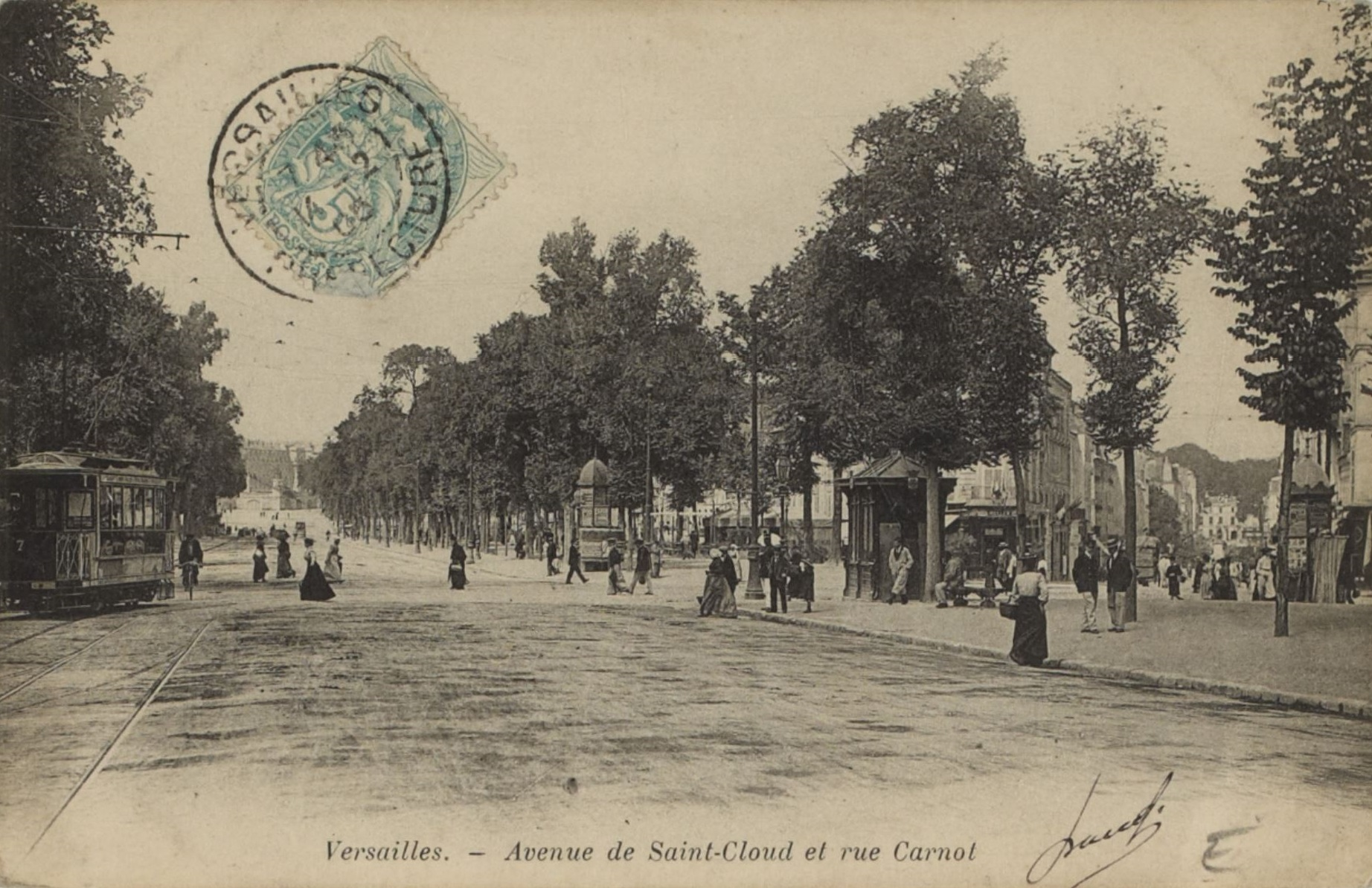
Crossroads of Avenue de Saint-Cloud with Rue Carnot at the beginning of the 20th century.

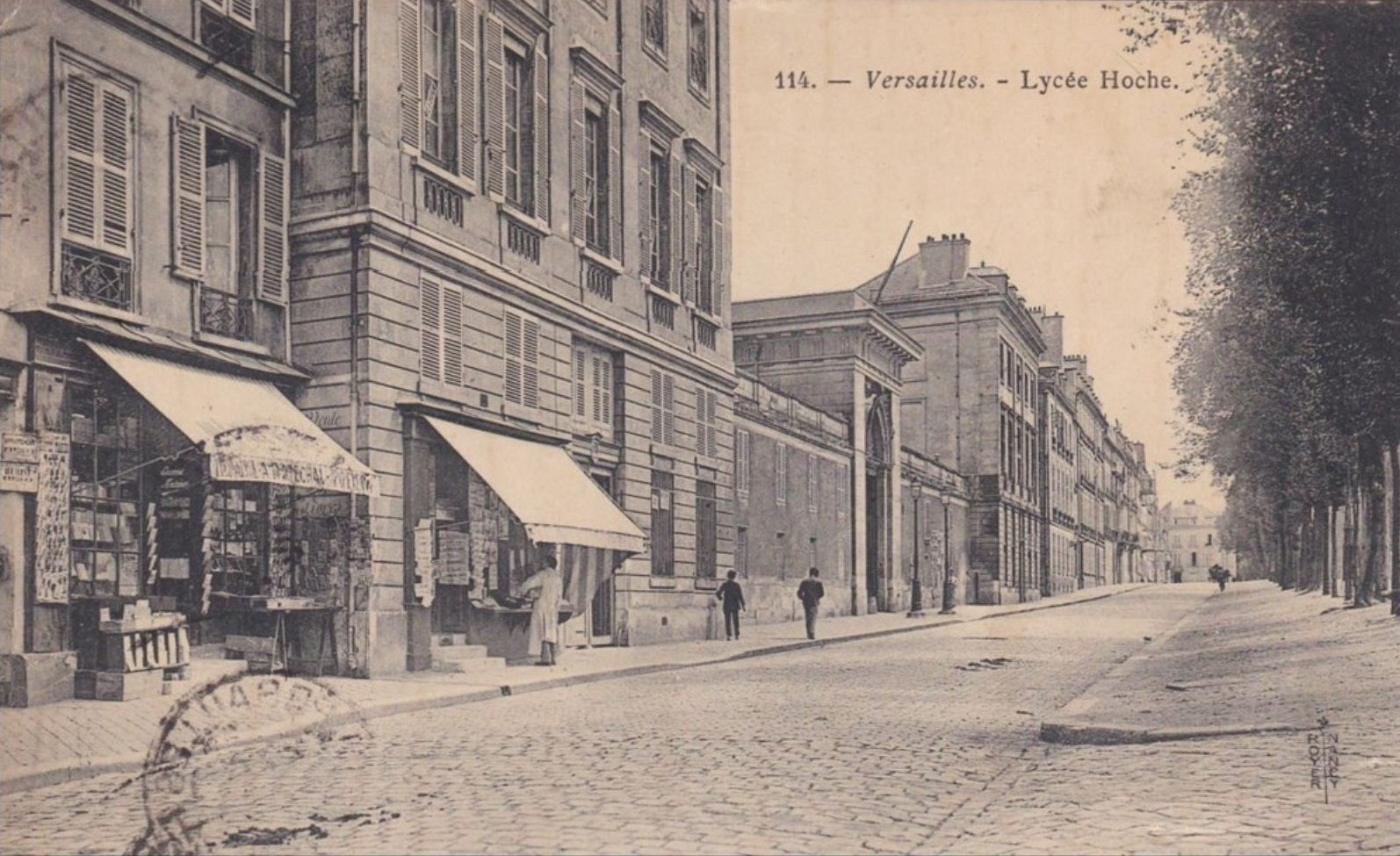
Entrance to Lycée Hoche facing Avenue de Saint-Cloud, next to the "Maréchal" bookstore and stationery shop
