= Square des Francine =

Square in Versailles, France

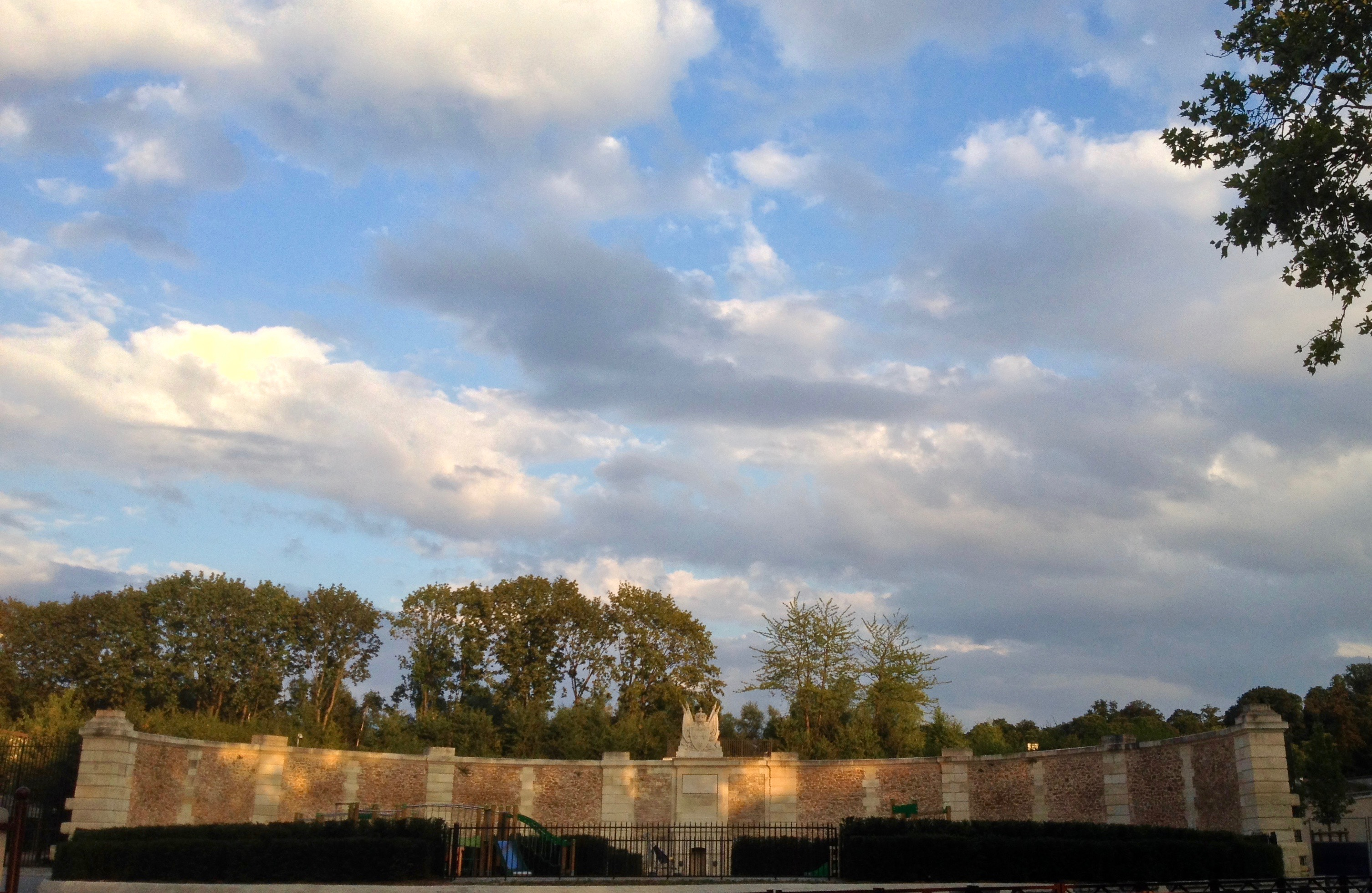
- Square des Francine as seen from the Avenue de Sceaux
- Interactive map of the Square des Francine area

General information
- Type: Public park with a fountain
- Location: Avenue de Sceaux, Versailles, France
- Coordinates: 48°47′50″N 2°07′53″E
- Construction started: under Louis XIV
- Renovated: Spring 2016

Square des Francine is a public park created from a former watering pool for horses, situated at the edge of the Avenue de Sceaux in Versailles, France. In 2016 the pool was transformed into a geometrical shrubbery park with a playground for children around a fountain.

The Francines were a family who, over several generations, created and oversaw the hydraulic system that powered the many fountains in the garden of Versailles during the 17th and 18th centuries. The newly created fountain is named in their honour.

== History ==
Originally, the Square des Francine was a vacant lot in the royal domain and dominated by the Gobert reservoirs, which was transformed into the Jardin des Etangs Gobert (Gobert Pond Garden) in 2014.

In 1808, renovations by the architect Jean-Prospèr Marital created a drinking trough 32m in diameter surrounded by a stone wall and a paved ground for receiving horses, and a wall built to hide the view from the Palace of Versailles

In 1934, the field around the horse watering pool was registered in Monuments historiques (national heritage site in France) as "Abreuvoir Louis XIV" (Horse-watering-pool of Louis XIV).

During World War II, the original construction was destroyed, leaving only the semicircular wall seen today.

Between 1955 and 1957, the city of Versailles developed the site into a public park with a pond of 80m2 surrounded by 4 wings of playing zone and the ring formed walking place around the wings.

Between 2012 and 2014, as part of a development plan for the Versailles Chantiers area, the semicircular wall was renovated. The rest of the area was also developed and the Square des Francine was opened to the public in 2016.

== Structure of the Square des Francine ==
- a semicircular paved wall at the edge of South-East
- Inside of the wall, the shrubbery is geometrically planted, and some benches are placed
- the pond has been removed and replaced by a dry fountain
- The north-west side is a playground for children
- Embedded in the centre of the wall is a plaque dedicated by the Mayor dated 1808, surmounted by the Versailles coat of arms.
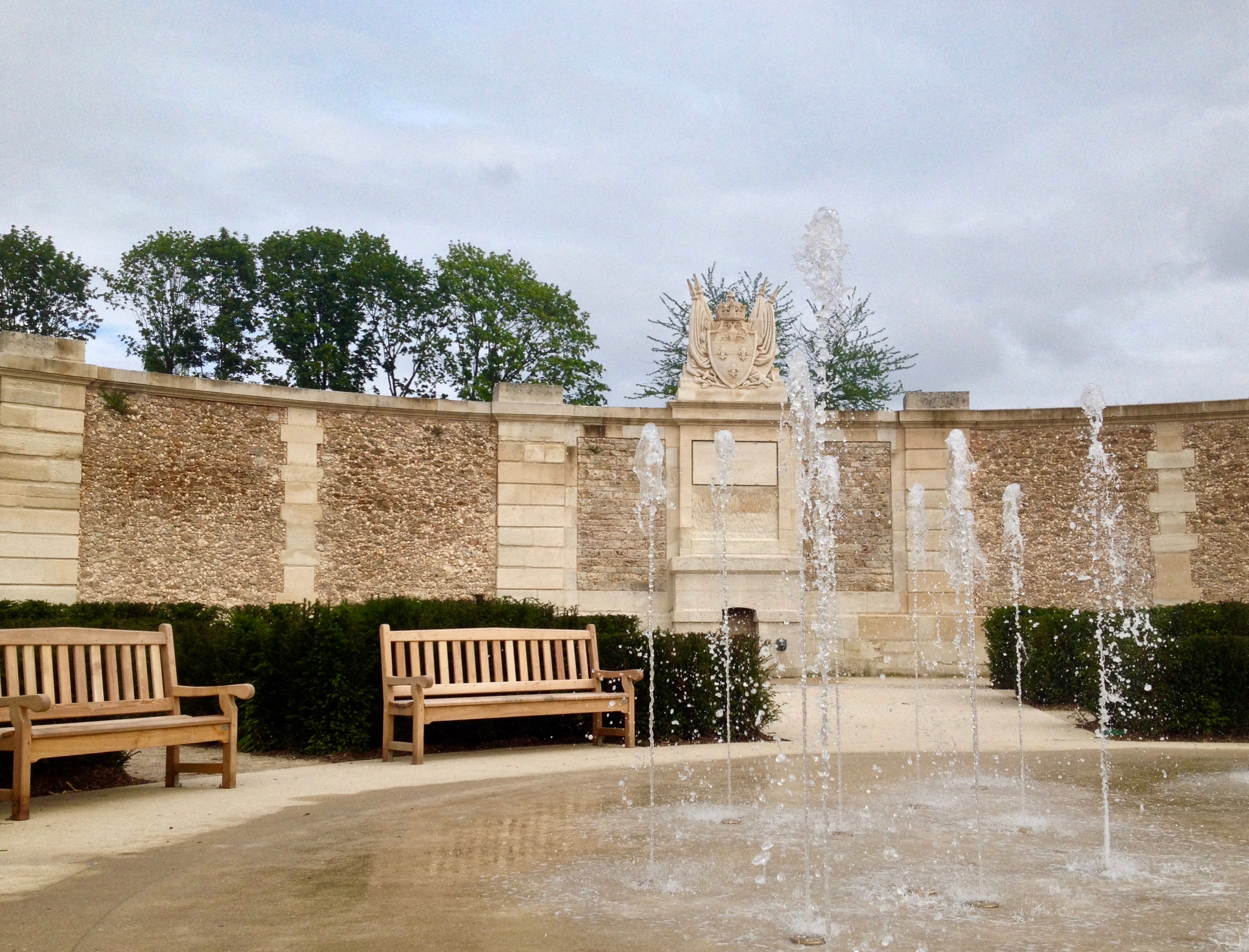
Fountain at the Square des Francine

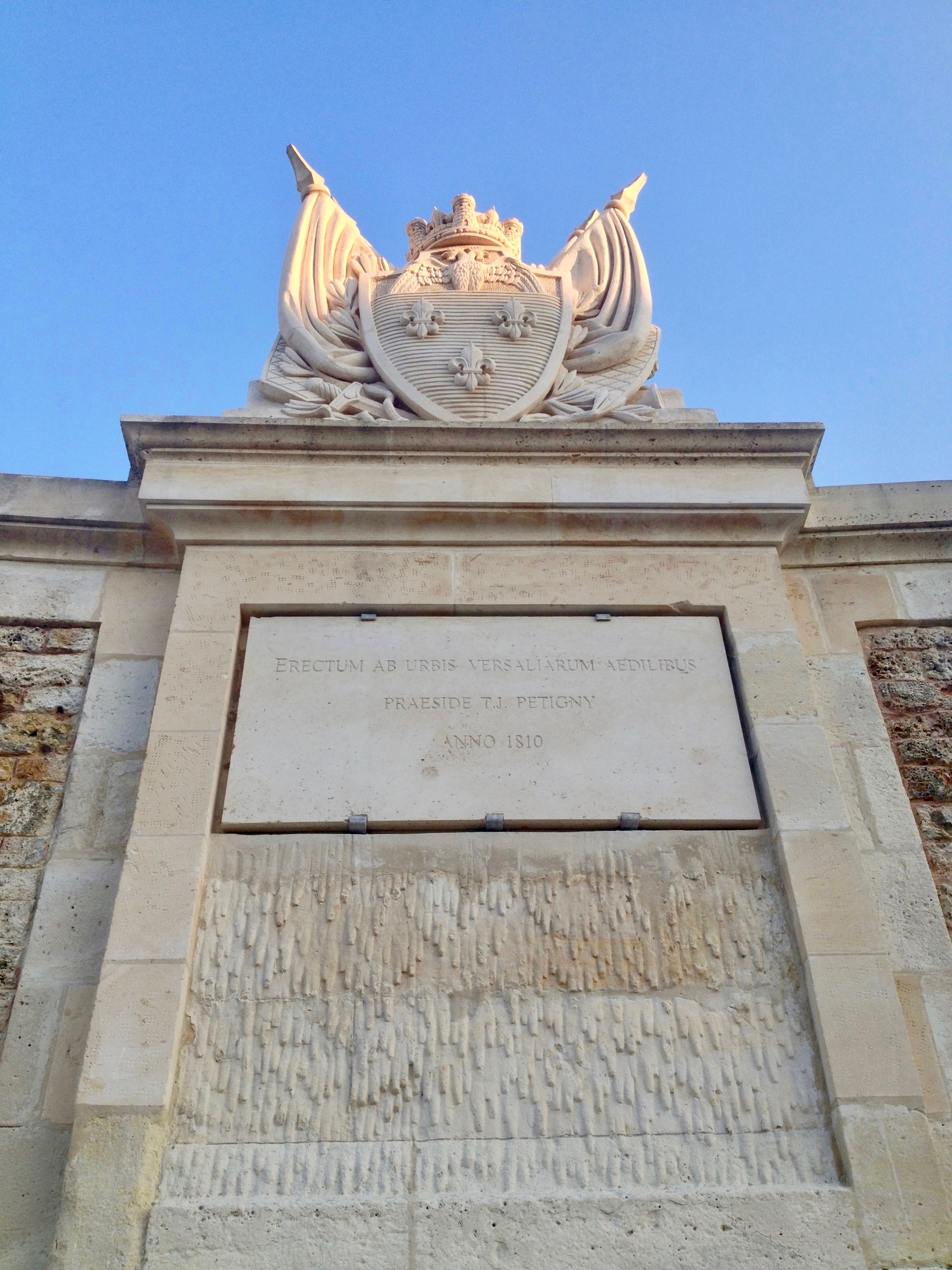
Plaque dedicated to the Mayor

== Movie filmed at Square des Francine ==
- Park Benches (France, 2009)

== The project of the development of Versailles Chantiers area (2012-2019) ==
The city of Versailles develop the building of the SNCF train station of Versailles Chantiers and its area for:

- The Jardin des Etangs Gobert (2014)
- The Square des Francine (2016)
- The extended part of the SNCF station of Versailles Chantiers (2016)
- Two new buildings for offices, apartments, shops and services (2019)
- A bus station and a car parking (2019)
- A new head office of Nature et Découverte (2019)
