= Paris Avenue (Versailles) =

Thoroughfare in Versailles, Paris

- Avenue de Paris
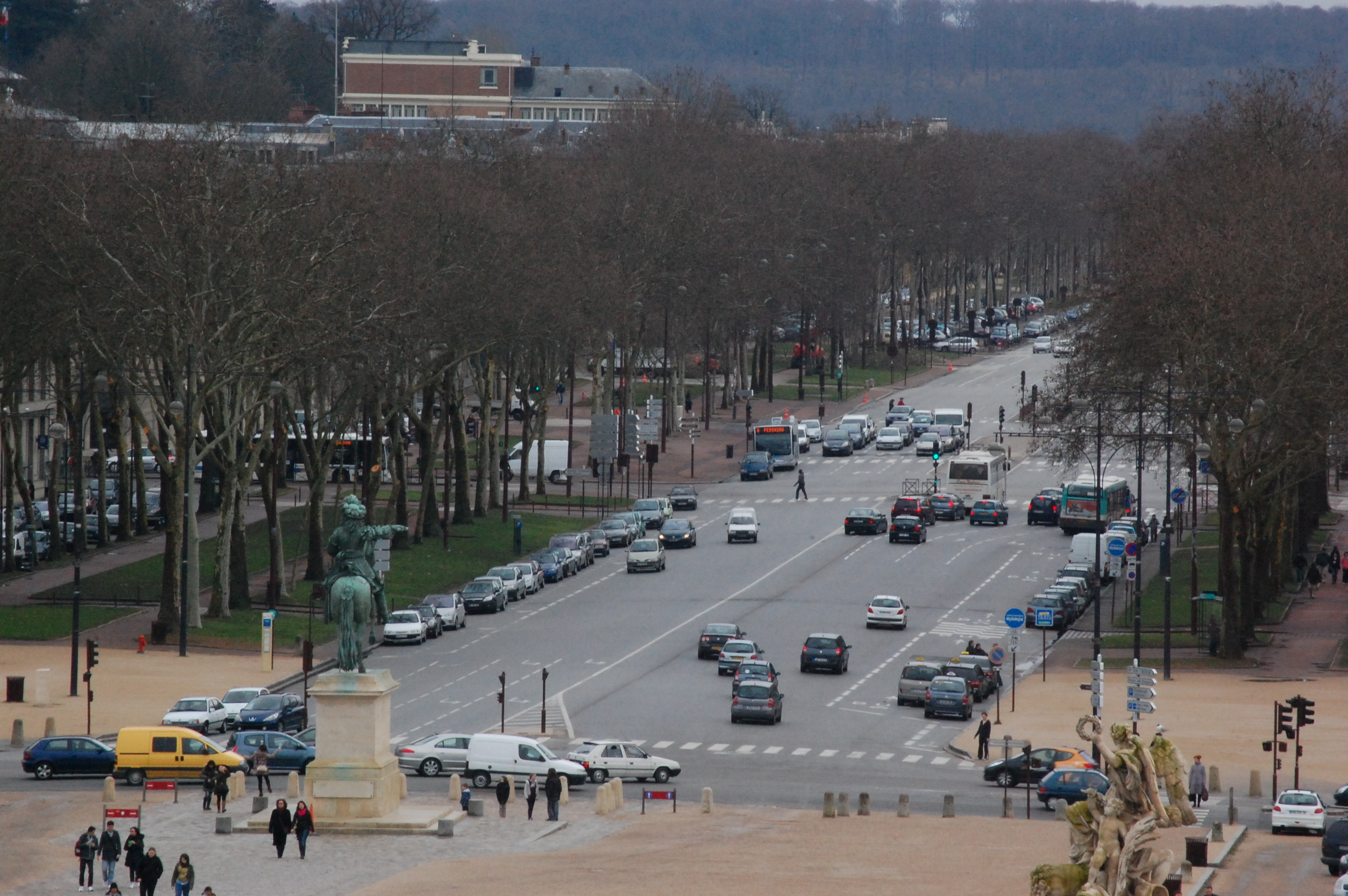
- Paris Avenue, seen from the Pavillon Dufour in the Château de Versailles.

- Location within France
- Length: 1.55 mi (2.49 km)
- Width: 0.06 mi (0.097 km)
- Location: Versailles, Yvelines
- Coordinates: 48°48′02″N 02°08′09″E
- East end: Place Louis XIV
- West end: Place d'Armes (Versailles)

Construction
- Completed: 1685

The Paris Avenue (Avenue de Paris, in French) is a thoroughfare in Versailles, France.

== Location and access ==
The Paris Avenue(Avenue de Paris, in french) is one of three roads that fan out from Place d'Armes, in front of the Château de Versailles, along with Avenue de Saint-Cloud to the north and Avenue de Sceaux to the south. The Avenue de Paris, in the center, is located in the axis of the château. It runs southeast for around 1,500 m, then bends east for 1 km to end at Place Louis-XIV. On the other side of the square, it is extended by the Avenue du Général-Leclerc in Viroflay.

At 90 m wide, the avenue is one of the widest in France. It consists of a central artery dedicated to automobile traffic, and two contra-alleys. A median strip planted with two rows of plane trees separates the central thoroughfare from the side-alleys. Because of its width, it forms a real physical boundary within the city, cutting it into two parts. It separates the Notre-Dame and Montreuil districts to the north of the avenue from the Saint-Louis, Chantiers and Porchefontaine districts to the south. It takes its name from the fact that it leads to Paris via Sèvres. It is also the link between the center of Versailles and Porchefontaine.

The Paris Avenue coincides with Route Départementale 10 for most of its length.

Numerous parking spaces are available along this road, either in a parallel or in a herringbone pattern. Most of these spaces are pay and display parking meters.

For some years now, the city has been deploying bikeways on the Paris Avenue's medians, as well as bicycle parking hoops.

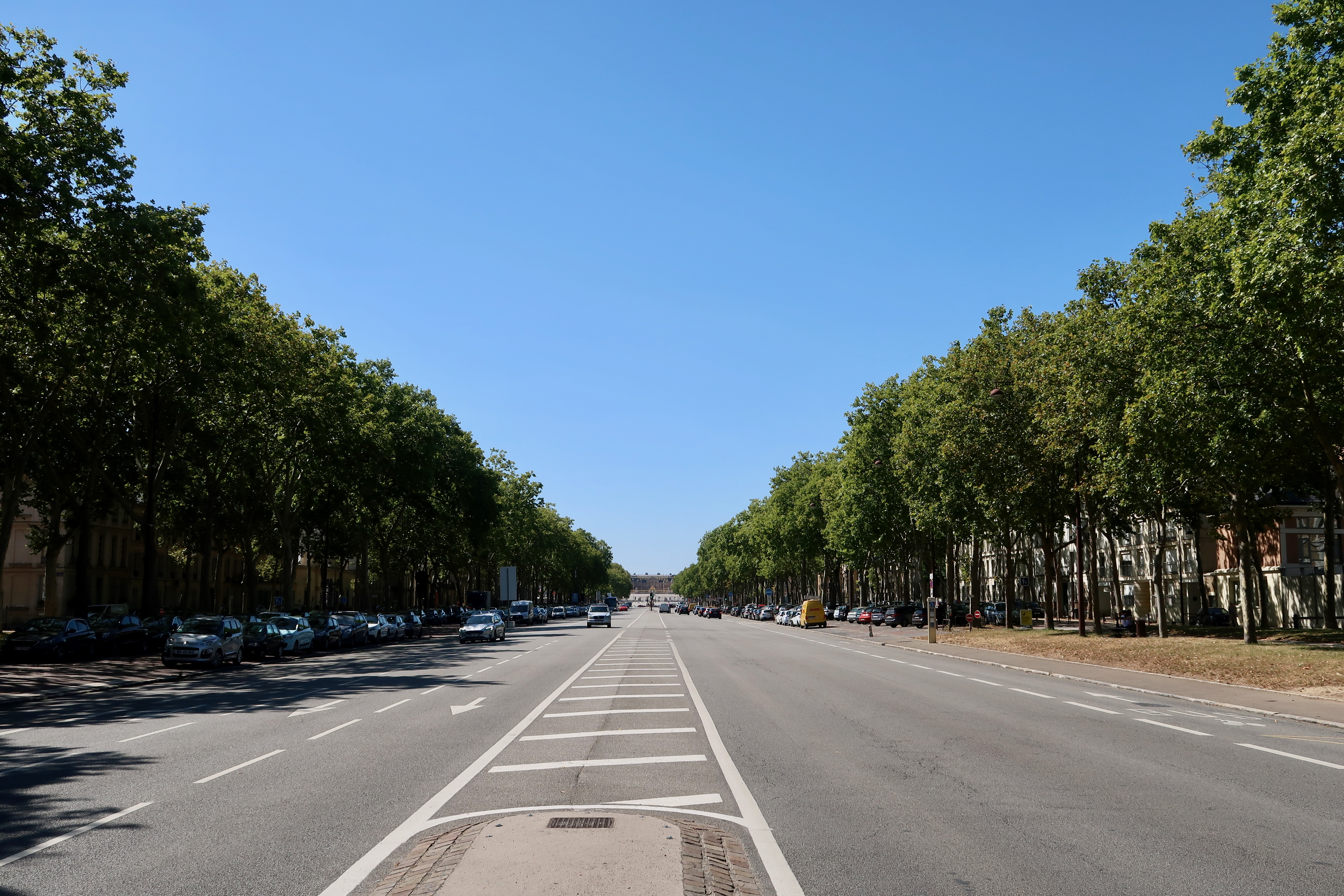
The Avenue de Paris and its long perspective. At the far end of the avenue, one can see the royal palace.

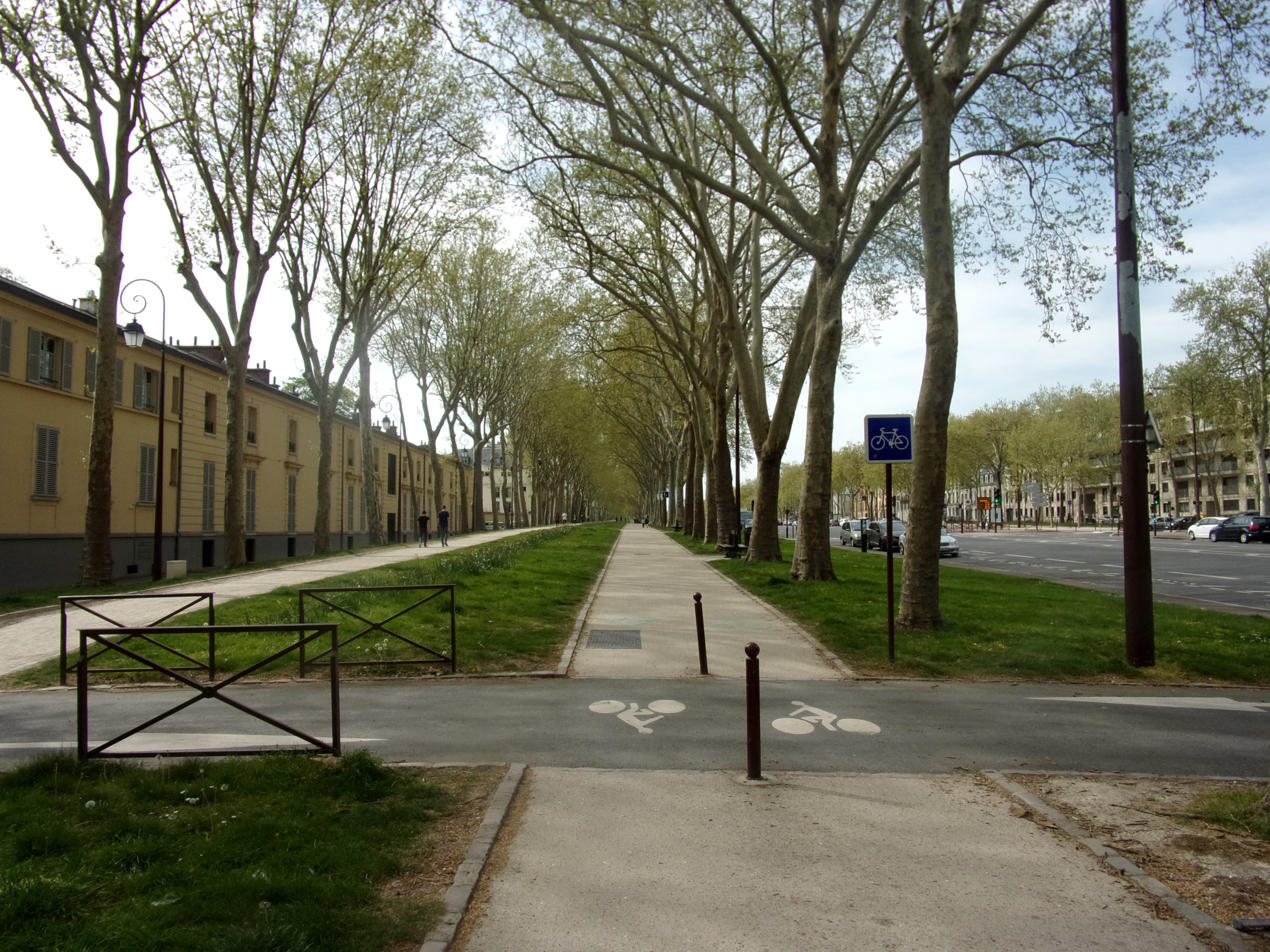
One of the medians on Paris Avenue with its double row of plane trees and cycle path.

== Name origin ==
It is so named because it heads towards Paris.

== Historical background ==
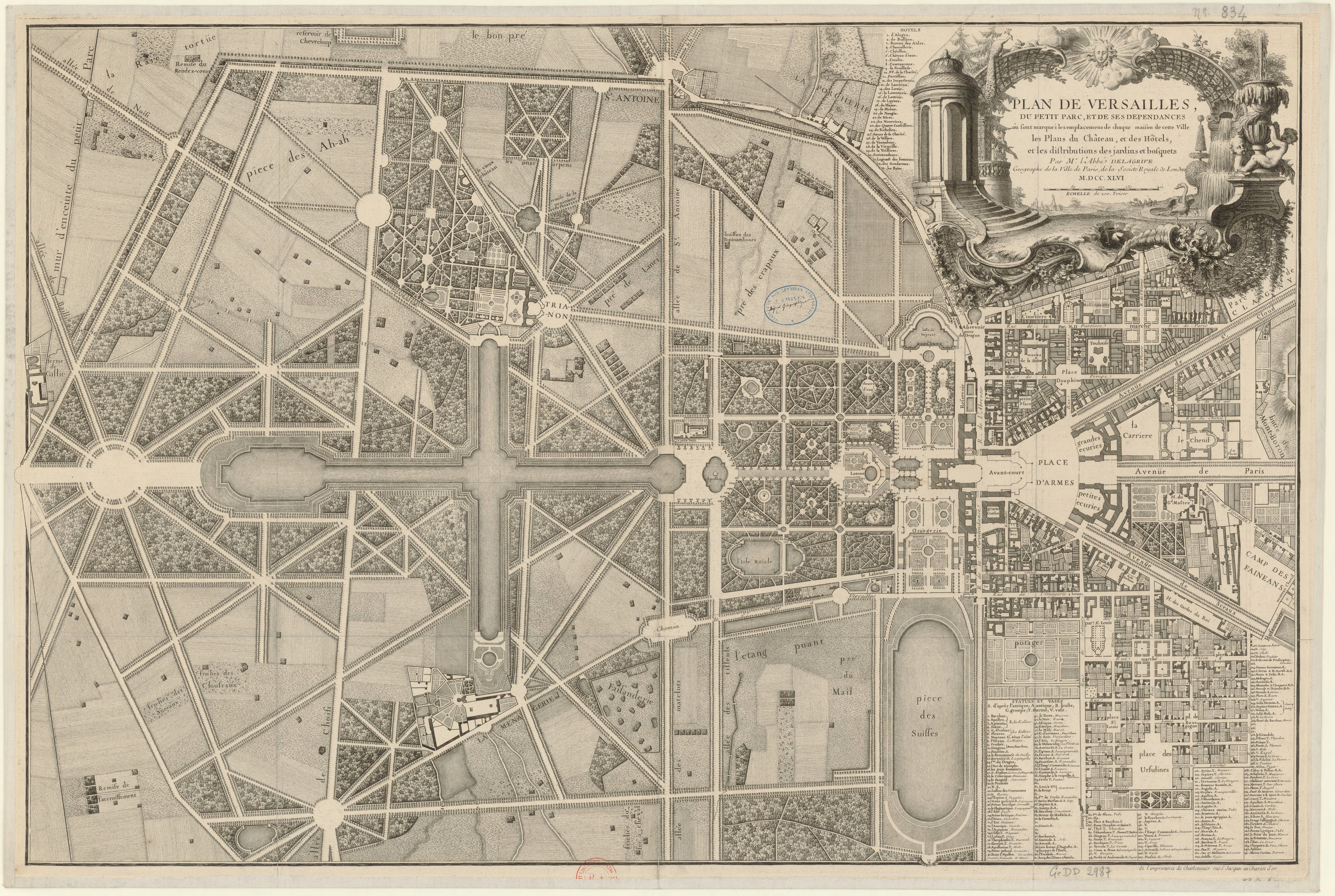
Map of Versailles, 1756, showing Paris Avenue to the right of the central axis and Place d'Armes.

The Paris Avenue was born of the Sun King's desire to build a wide, straight, tree-lined avenue leading from the Place d'Armes, to showcase the palace of Versailles by creating a perspective view. Before the avenue was built, there were only two ways to get from the village of Versailles to Paris, one of them winding to the north and the other to the south around the obstacle constituted by the Montbauron hill. To build the Paris Avenue, four years of earthworks were necessary, using shovels and pickaxes, wicker baskets and dump trucks. A trench had to be opened up on the southern flank of the Montbauron hill, whose embossing blocked the view of the palace. To get an idea of the scale of the work involved, one need only consider how steeply the Montbauron street slopes away from the avenue. In addition, the avenue had to be raised above the Porchefontaine ponds. The avenue was completed in 1685 and took its present name.

In 1824, on the orders of the Marquis de la Londe, mayor of the 3rd arrondissement of Seine and Oise, the city built pavilions to collect the octroi tax. Two pavilions were built on the Paris Avenue at the entrance to Versailles, on either side of the central artery. Iron gates running the full width of the Avenue de Paris were also installed. These pavilions and gates were used to control and tax the passage of goods. The building on the left, on the way from Paris, housed the collection office, while the building on the right was used to accommodate the officials. As octroi had become a tax that hampered the development of economic activity, the municipality decided to abolish it in February 1943 and replace it with local taxes. The buildings were disused and the gates removed. For a time, the municipality considered destroying the pavilions, as they made the intersection of Avenue de Paris with Avenue de Porchefontaine and Rue Vauban a dangerous one. Indeed, they constitute a visual obstacle. But the Monuments Historiques, which listed them in June 1959, objected. Finally, in 1993, the crossroads was redesigned to make it safer, while the pavilions were preserved as a symbolic entrance to the city.

The Paris Avenue was served by the tramway line from Sèvres to Versailles from 1857 to 1934, when it was replaced by the RATP 171 bus line. At its inception, the tramway consisted of a horse-drawn carriage. The tramway line was mechanized in 1894, then fully electrified in 1913.

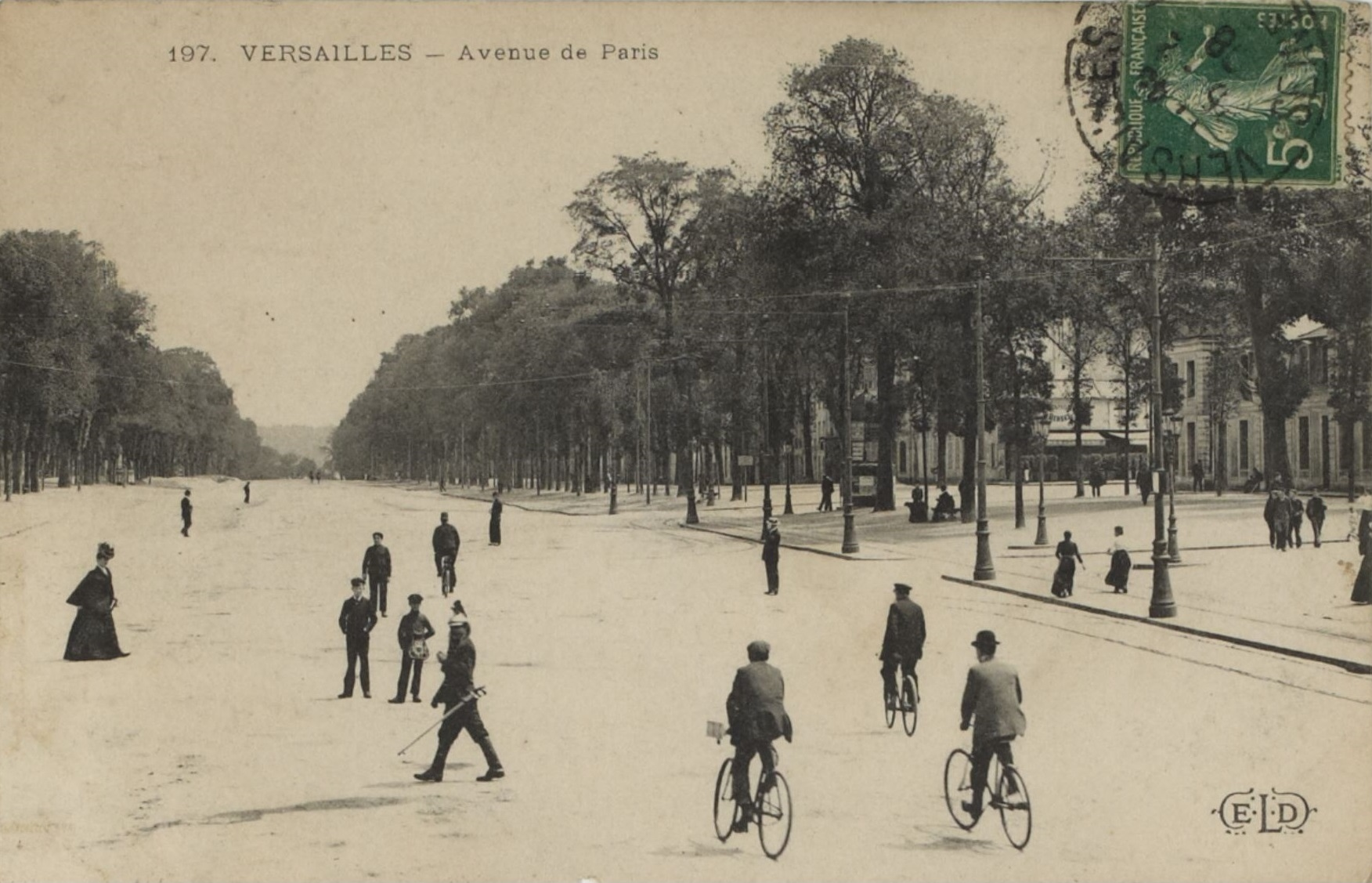
Paris Avenue at the beginning of the 20th century. There are no cars in sight yet. Pedestrians and cyclists have the whole avenue at their disposal (ELD postcard).

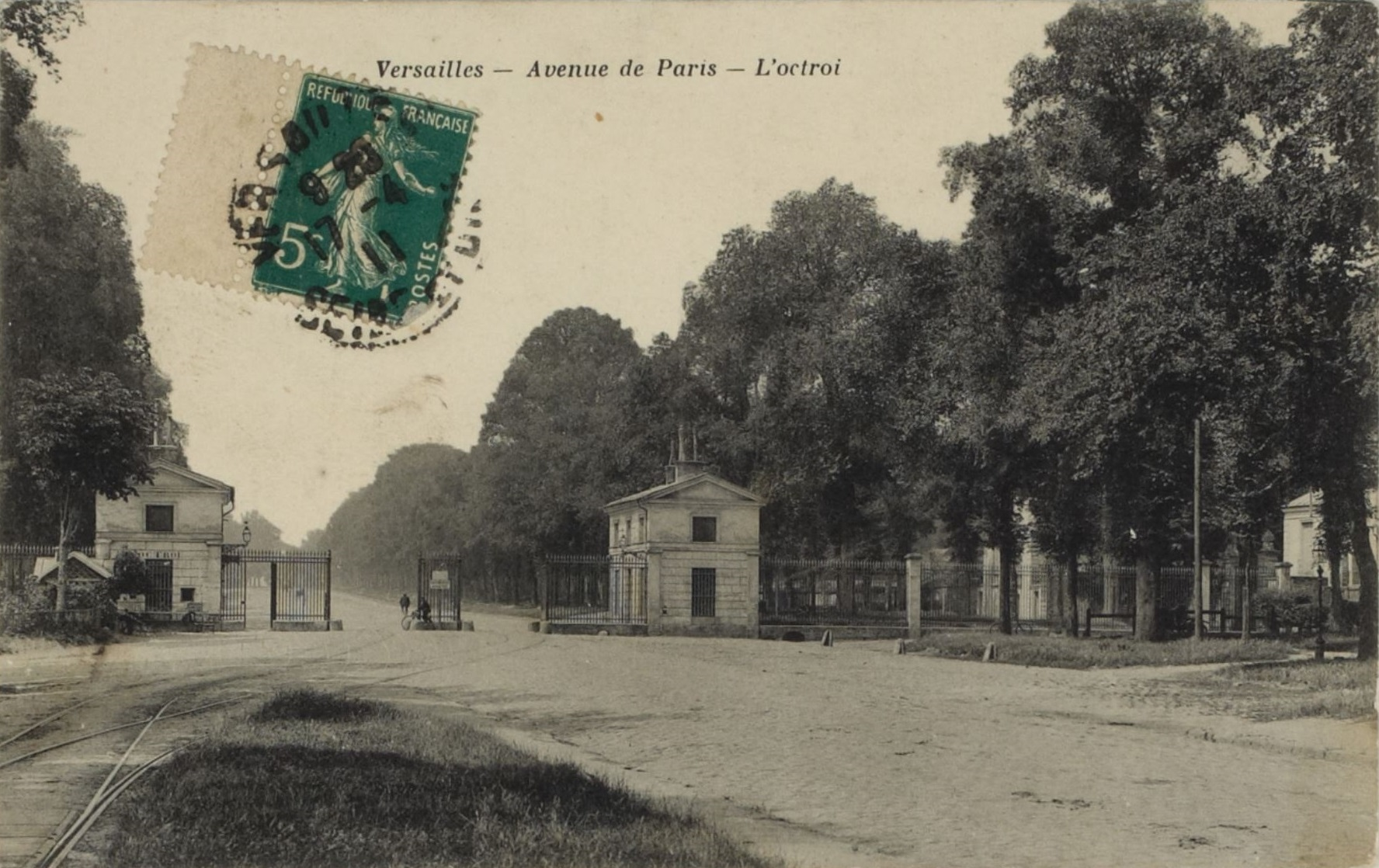
The pavilions and octroi gates on Paris Avenue in the early 20th century, with the tramway tracks on the left.

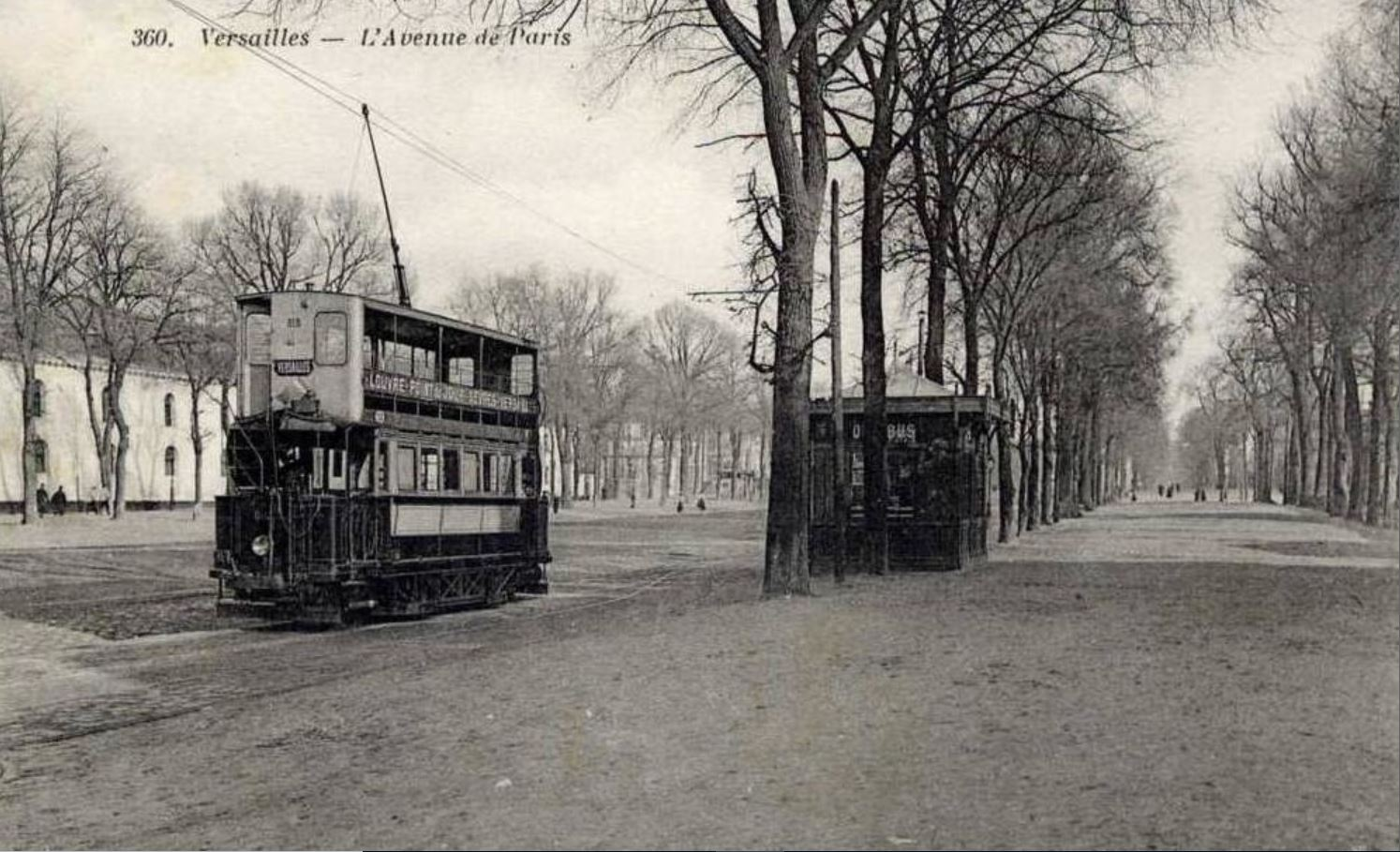
The Sèvres Versailles tramway serving Paris Avenue in the early 20th century (after electrification in 1913), now replaced by the RATP bus line 171.

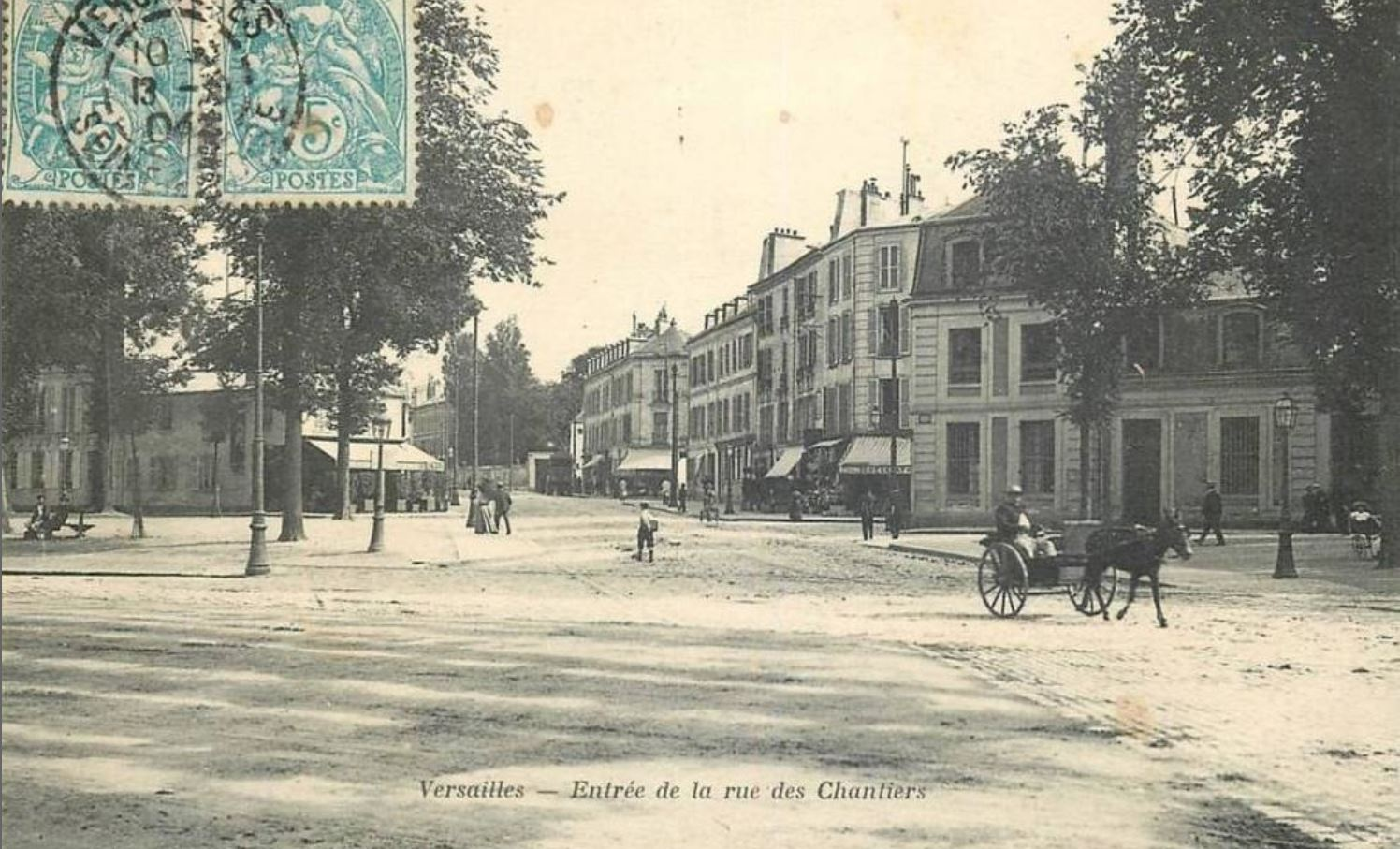
Junction of Avenue de Paris and Rue des Chantiers (now Rue des Etats-Généraux) at the beginning of the 20th century.

== Events ==
Every year since 1976, the Paris Avenue has served as the finishing line of the Paris-Versailles race. The avenue's two-kilometre false flat is the race's final hurdle.

On March 4, 1984, the avenue was the site of a demonstration by the "mouvement de l'École libre" (the "free school movement" in English), which stretched as far as Place d'Armes.

== Remarkable buildings and places of remembrance ==
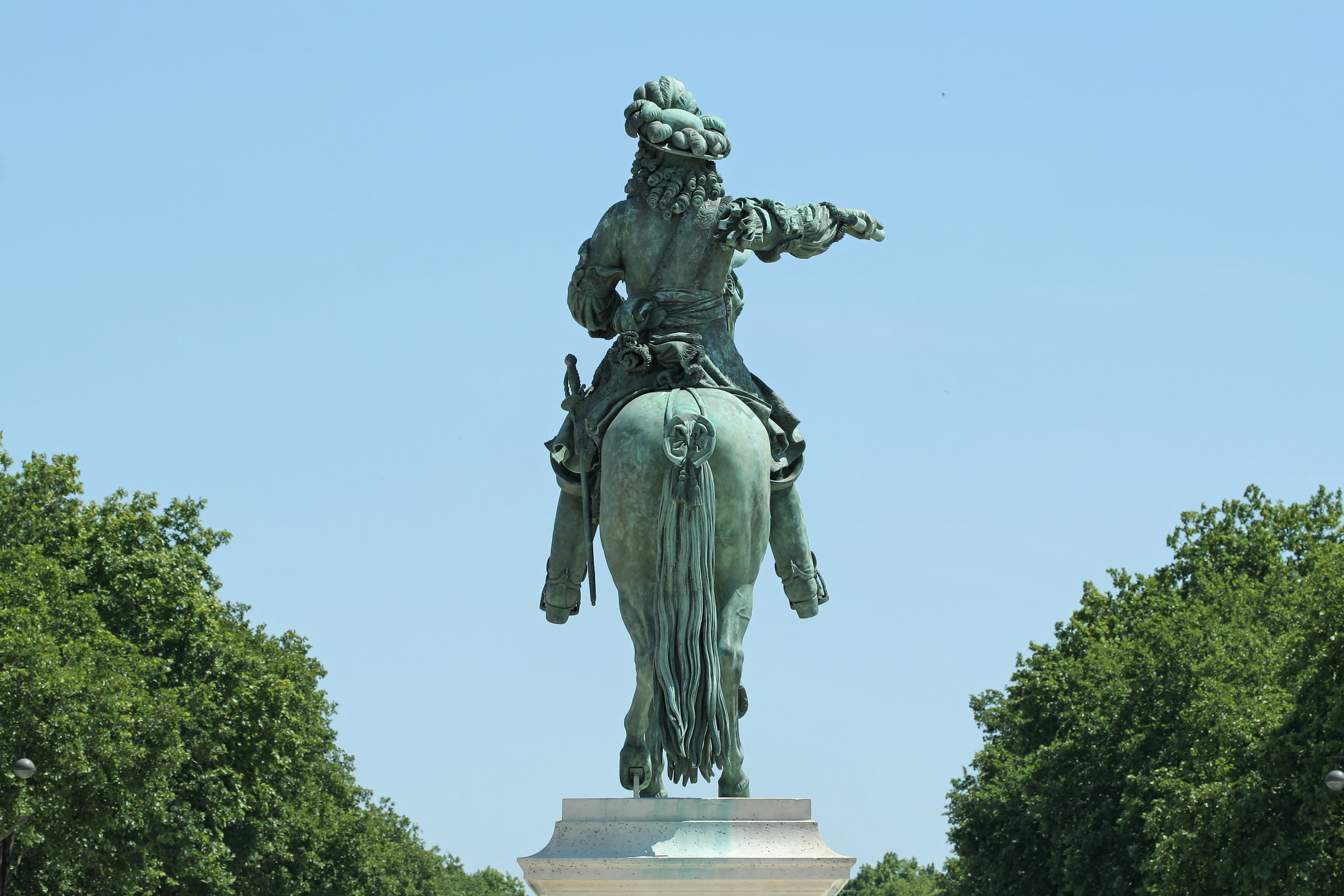
Statue de Louis XIV on the place d'Armes in the axis of the Avenue de Paris.

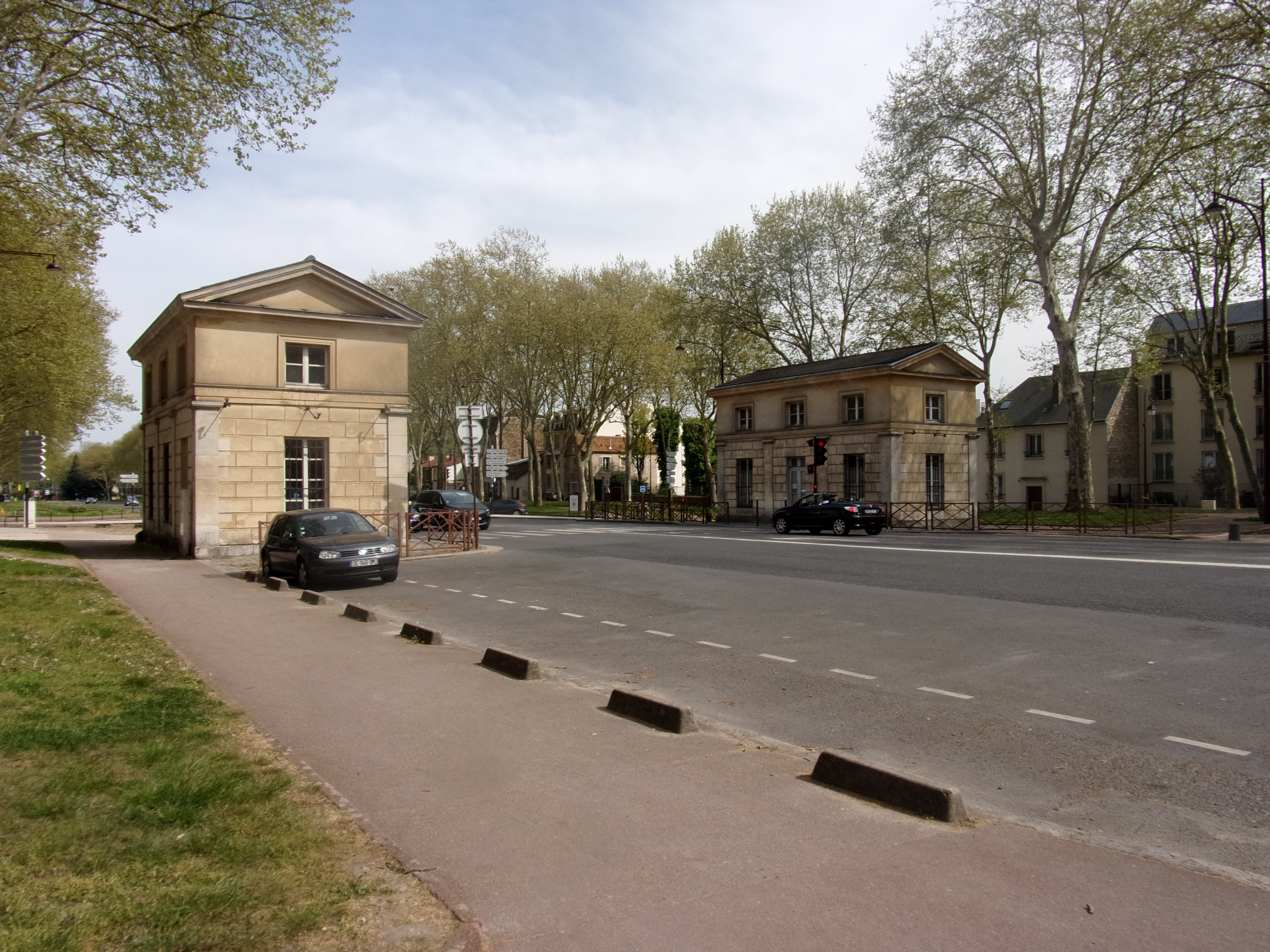
The octroi pavilions at the crossroads with Avenue de Porchefontaine form a symbolic entrance to the royal city.

The Paris Avenue borders the following buildings:

- Grande Écurie, whose facades overlooking the main courtyard and the avenues de Paris and de Saint-Cloud, the facades of the two pavilions and the railings bordering the Place d'Armes were listed as historic monuments by decree of August 20, 1913;
- Petite Écurie, classified as a historic monument in its entirety by decree of September 16, 1929;
- No. 3: a 1950s rectangular building designed by Robert Camelot, which housed Versailles' central post office until the mid-2010s. At the end of the decade, it was redeveloped to house a 600-seat auditorium, restaurants, shops and a luxury goods innovation center.
- No. 4: Versailles town hall (Hôtel de ville de Versailles, in french).
- No. 6: Pavillon des Gendarmes, listed as a historic monument by decree of May 9, 1911;
- No. 11 and no. 13: Hôtel de préfecture des Yvelines;
- No. 19: former Du Barry stables, built from 1773 by architect Claude-Nicolas Ledoux for King Louis XV's last favorite. She wished to house her staff and store the carriages of her crews in this building adjoining the pavilion she had acquired in 1772 (see no. 21, below). Work was suspended after the King's death (1774), and completed by Jean-François Chalgrin for the Count of Provence, brother of King Louis XVI, then known as Monsieur (future Louis XVIII), owner of the stables from 1775, to Ledoux's plans. The building was listed as a historic monument in 1929 and 1965; now the Versailles police headquarters.
- No. 21: former Pavillon Du Barry (Madame du Barry's private residence), listed as a historic monument by decree of September 15, 1942;
- No 22: Hôtel des Menus-Plaisirs, listed as a historic monument by decree of May 21, 1927, with the exception of its facades, listed as a historic monument by decree of September 16, 1929;
- No 28: Maison d'arrêt de Versailles (women's prison).;
- No. 31: Lycée La Bruyère (general and technological high school);
- No. 57: Ancienne laiterie de Madame, classified as a historic monument by order of August 1, 1957;
- No. 63: Pavillon de Provence, former home of Monsieur, the king's brother. Louis XVIII was born here;
- No. 68: Convent of Solitude, this building belonged to the Comte de Vergennes, Louis XVI's Minister of Foreign Affairs from 1775 to 1787;
- No. 70: Lycée Marie-Curie (Marie-Curie High School);
- No. 73: Domain of Montreuil;
- No 109: Congregation of the Sisters Servants of the Sacred Heart of Jesus;
- No. 111: Chauchard park, with Madame's former music pavilion in the center, listed as a historic monument by decree of March 26, 1943;
- The former octroi pavilions.
