= Place d'Armes (Versailles) =

Square in Versailles, France

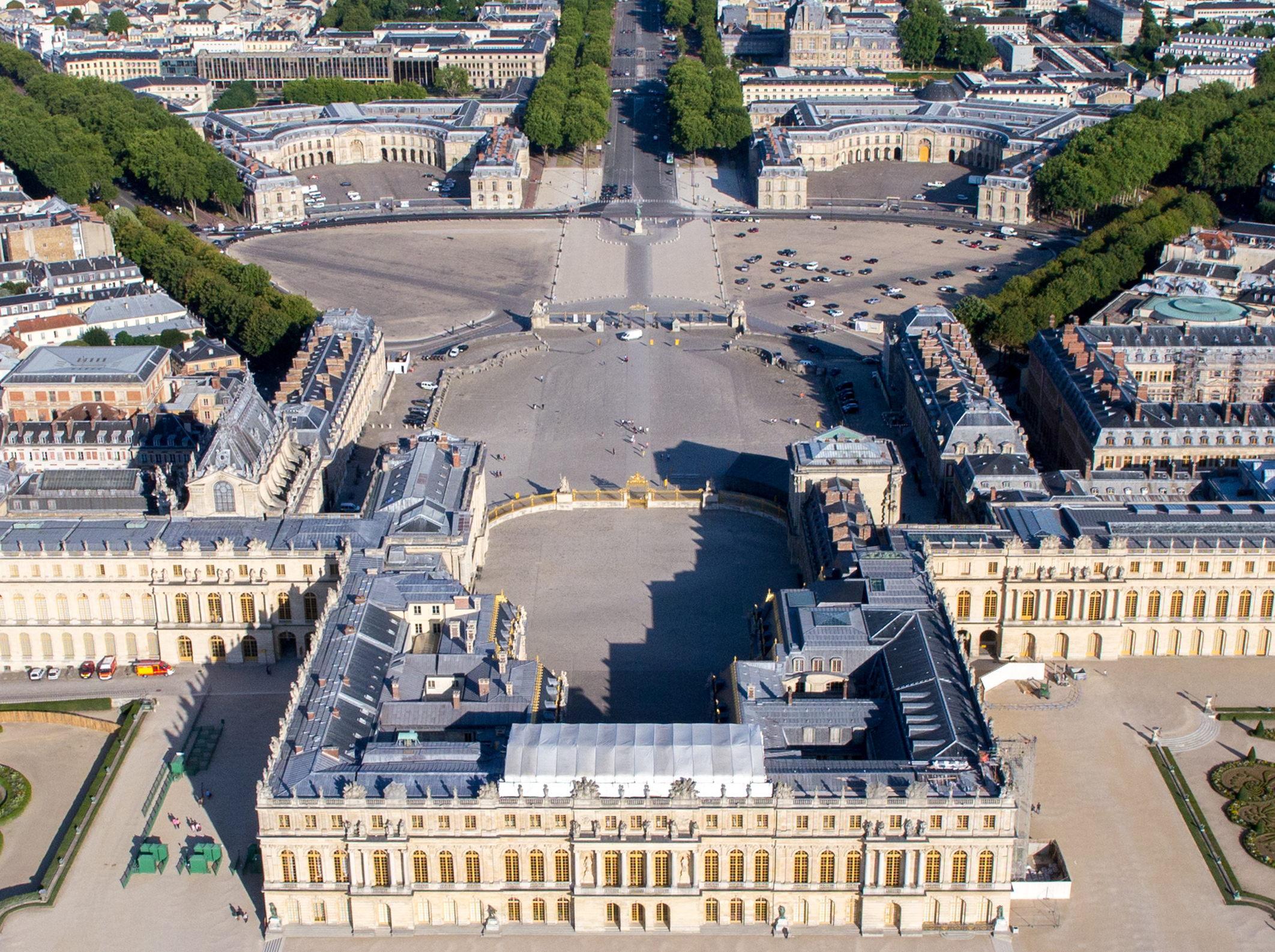
- The Place d'Armes, an extension of the Cour d'Honneur and Cour Royale, opens onto the Avenue de Paris.

- Location within France

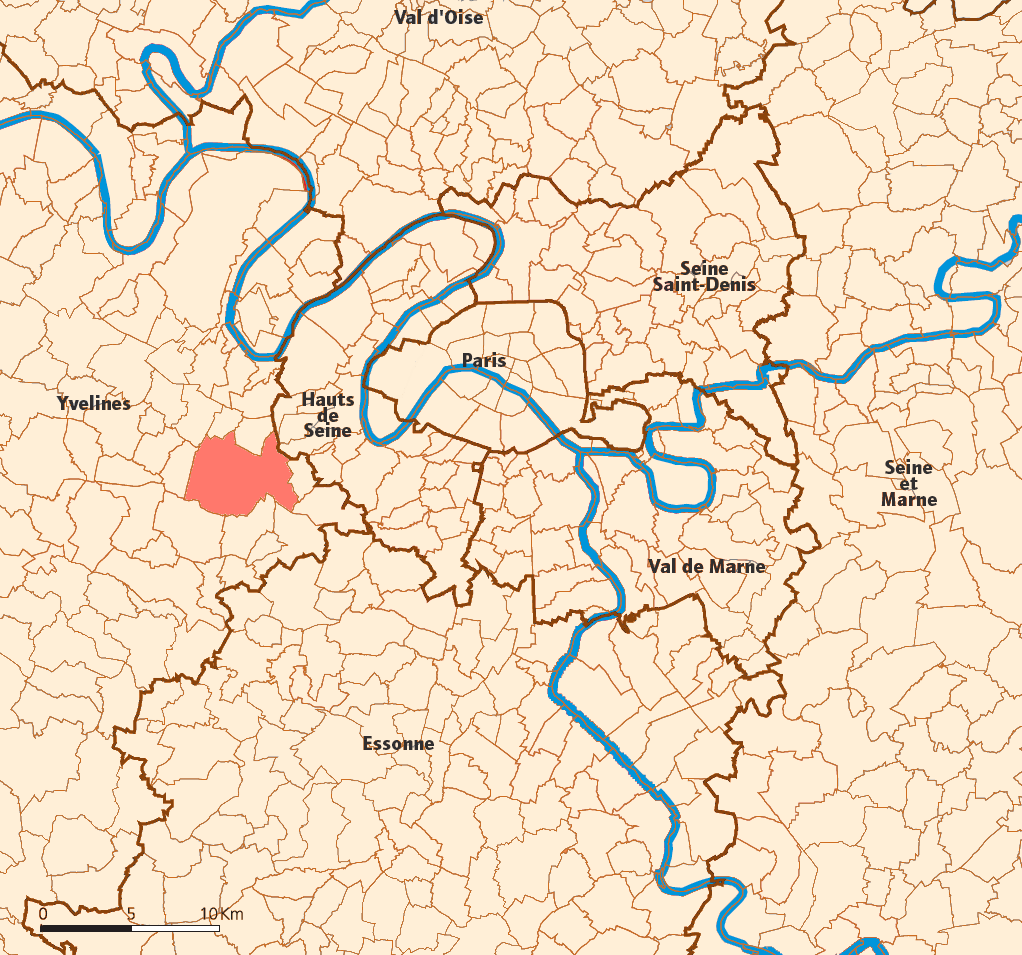
- Length: 300 m (980 ft)
- Width: 150
- Location: Versailles, Île-de-France; France
- Coordinates: 48°48′13″N 02°07′30″E

The Place d'Armes is a square in Versailles, France.

== Location and access ==
The Place d'Armes is a roughly fan-shaped square in front of the Palace of Versailles. It is approximately 300 m long and 150 m wide.

On the side opposite the palace, three roads radiate eastwards:

- to the north, Avenue de Saint-Cloud;
- in the center, Avenue de Paris, in line with the palace;
- to the south, Avenue de Sceaux.

== Name origin ==
Generally located at the center of a fortification, a place-of-arms is a gathering place for small troops and a central space for important military ceremonies.

== Historical background ==
In 1660, when Louis XIV decided to extend his palace, there was only a small square in front of it, extending into an alley that joined the Chemin de Saint-Cloud. Initially, the plan was to lay out three crow's-foot alleys starting from a half-moon-shaped square. But this project was too modest for the sovereign. It was decided to level and enlarge the Place d'Armes, and to radiate from it three wide avenues planted with trees. To achieve this, thousands of cubic meters of earth were removed from the top of the Montbauron hillock to level it, and used to fill in the square.

On August 23, 1754, King Louis XV set off fireworks on the square from his balcony, using a "running rocket" to celebrate the birth of the Duc de Berry, the future Louis XVI.

On March 4, 1984, the "Free School Movement" (mouvement de l'école libre, in French) held a demonstration on the Avenue de Paris, all the way to the Place d'Armes.

== Remarkable buildings and places of remembrance ==
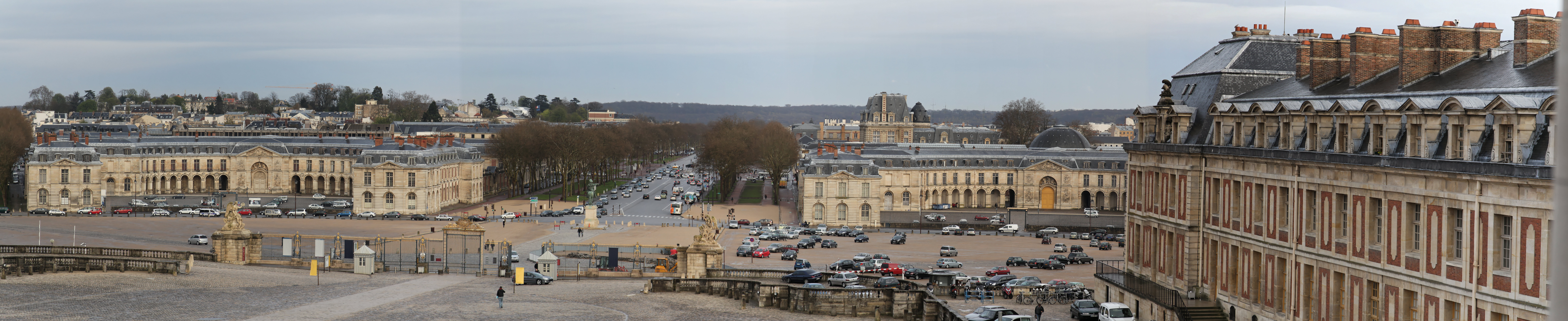
The Place d'Armes as seen from the castle's upper floors.

The Place d'Armes borders the following buildings:

- to the west, the Château de Versailles, where the Grille d'Honneur separates it from the Cour d'Honneur;
- to the east, the Grande Écurie;
- to the east, the Petite Écurie.

Since 2009, the square has also been home to the equestrian statue of Louis XIV, previously located in the Cour d'Honneur.

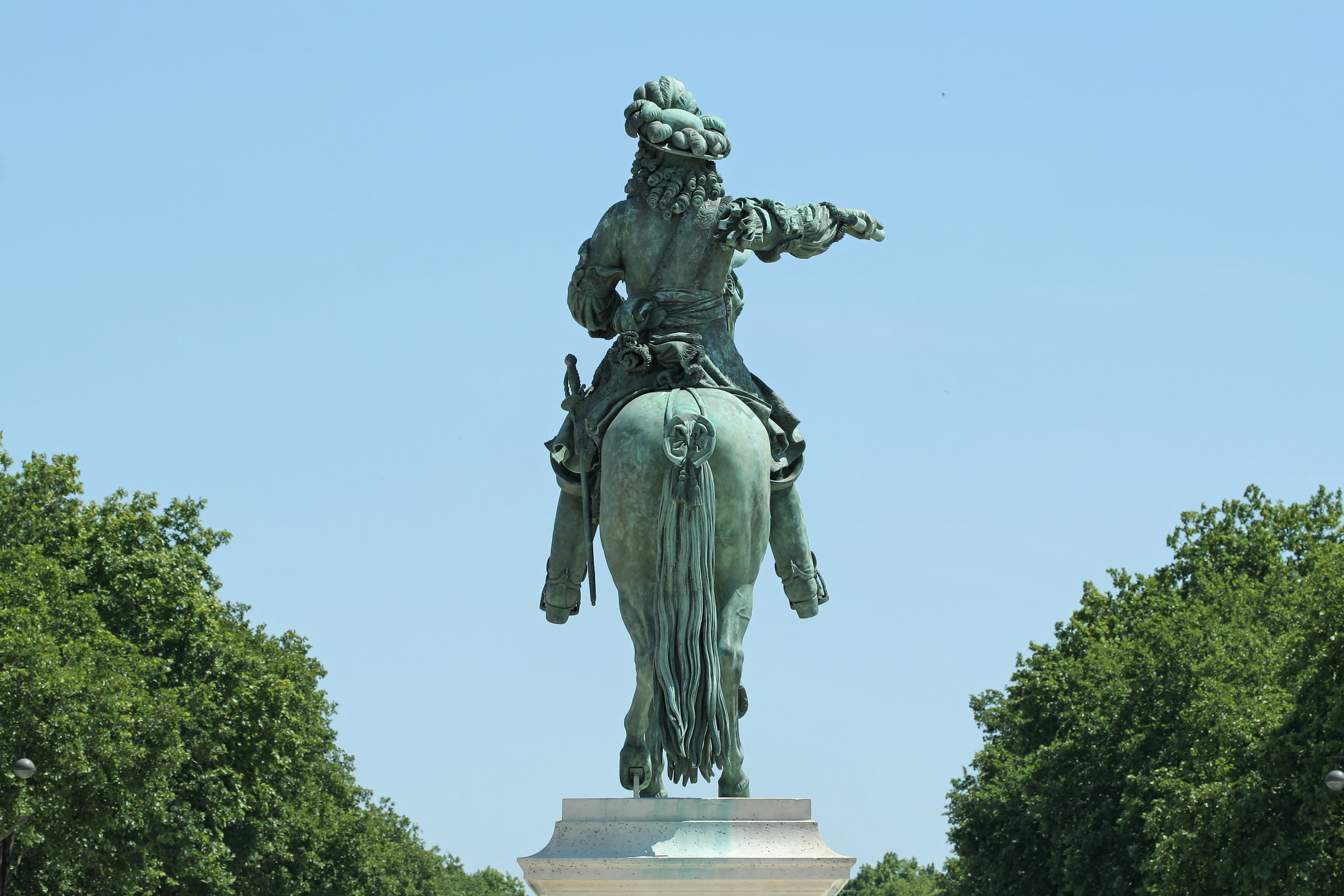
Statue of Louis XIV in line with Avenue de Paris.

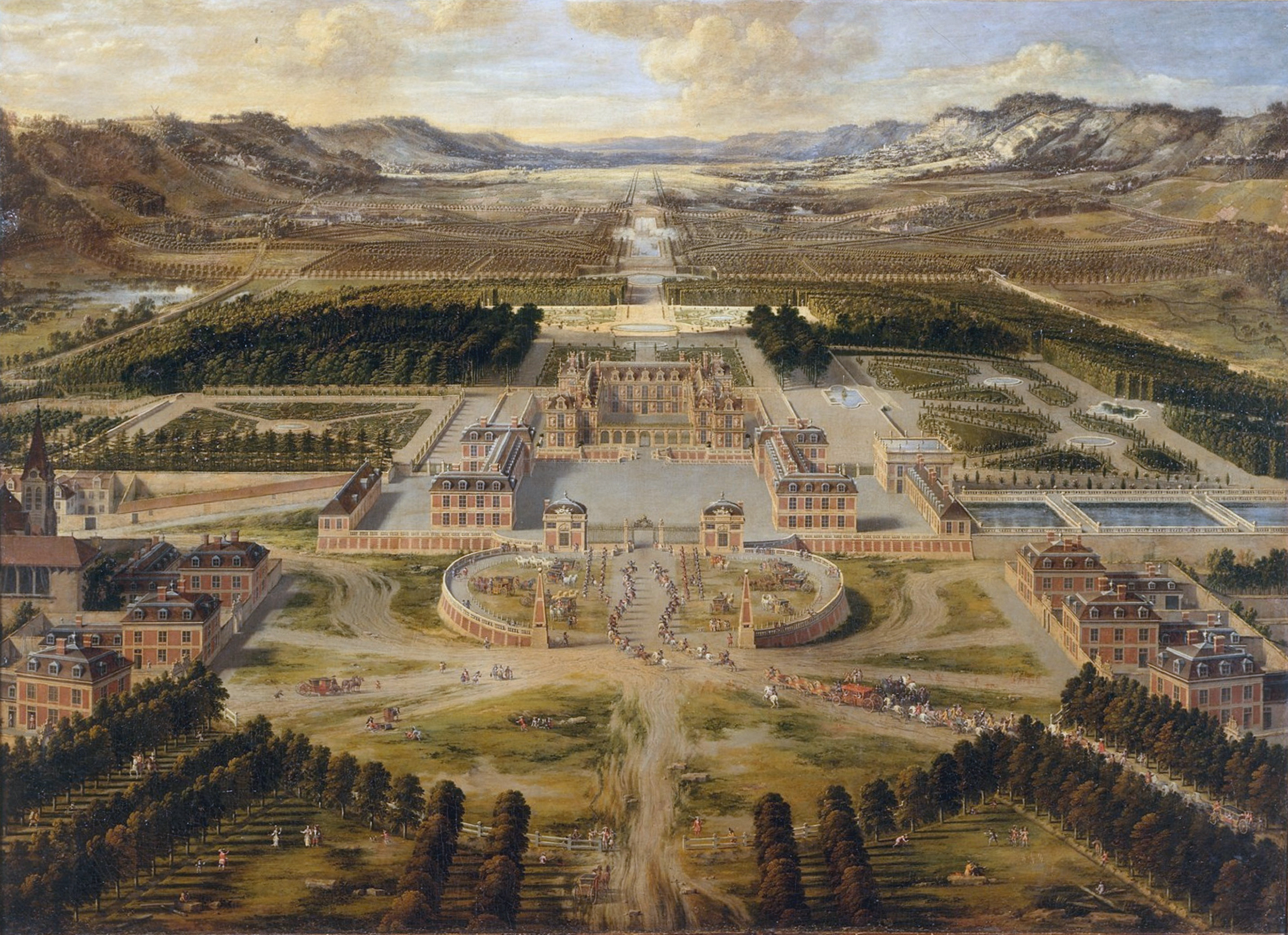
The Palace of Versailles with the Cour d'Honneur and Place d'Armes in the foreground in 1668

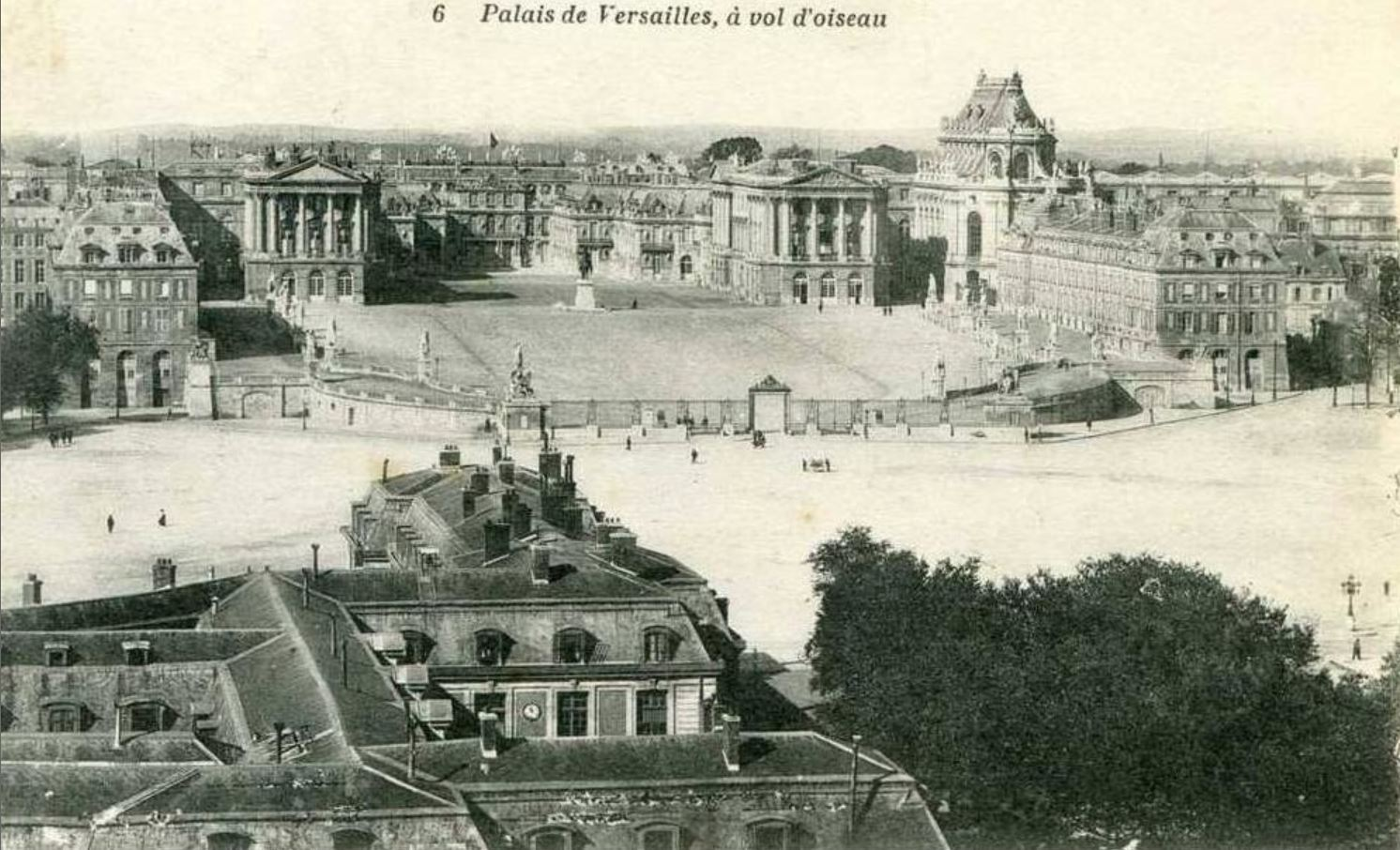
The Palace of Versailles with the Place d'Armes in the foreground at the beginning of the 20th century.

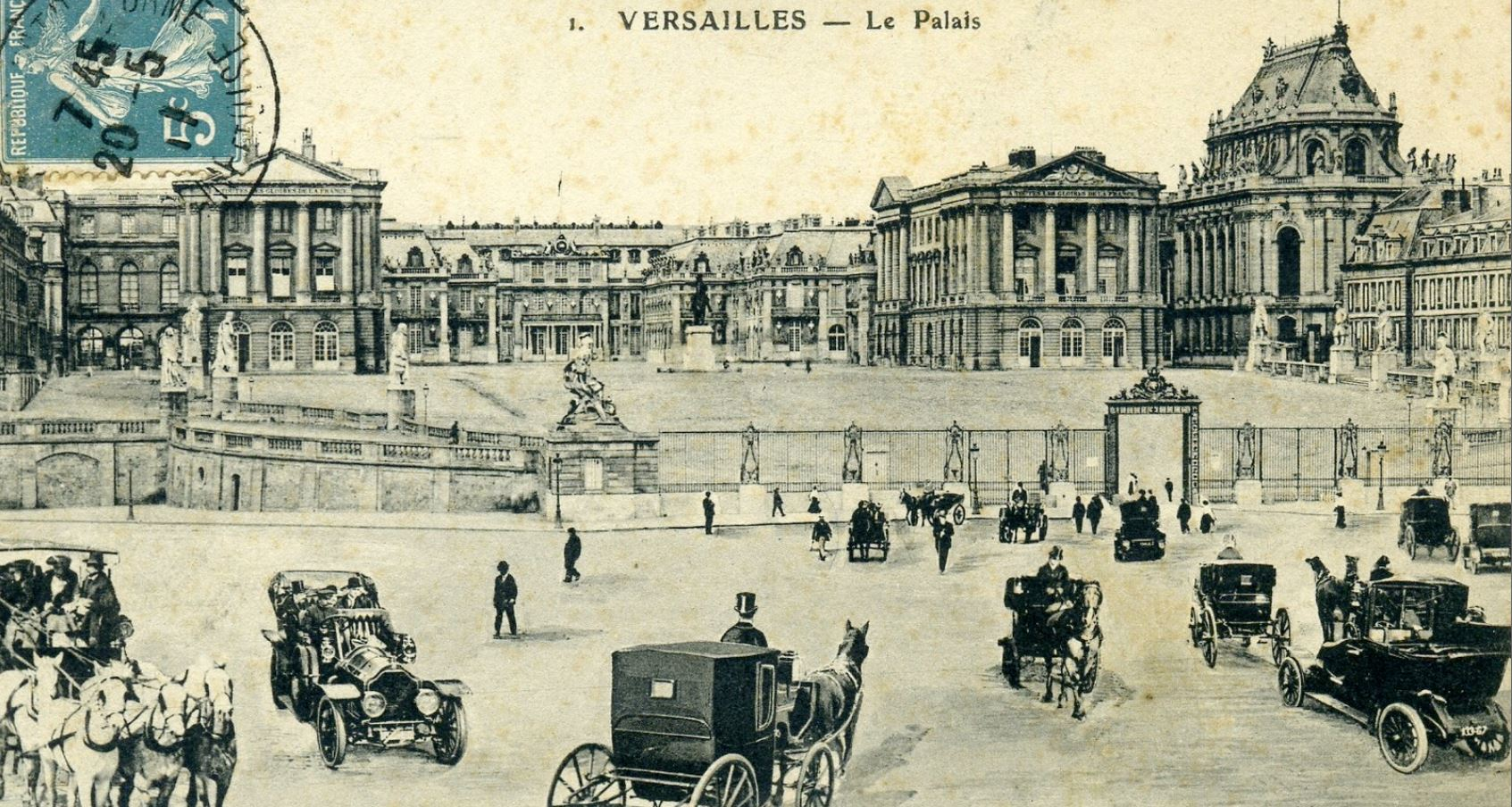
Place d'Armes in the early 20th century. Horse-drawn carriages and automobiles cross paths

== Operation ==
Currently, the Place d'Armes is used by Versailles town council as a parking lot (530 spaces) and for buses(170 spaces).
