= Enfilade (architecture) =

Suite of rooms along the same axis

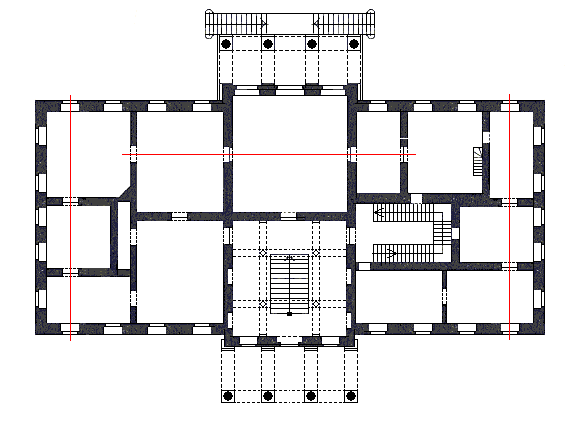
Plan of a building with three separate enfilades (marked red). Note alignment of doors between rooms to create a vista.

In architecture, an enfilade is a series of rooms formally aligned with each other. This was a common feature in grand European architecture from the Baroque era onward, though there are earlier examples, such as the Vatican stanze. The doors entering each room are aligned with the doors of the connecting rooms along a single axis, providing a vista through successive rooms. The enfilade may be used as a processional route and is a common arrangement in museums and art galleries, as it facilitates the movement of large numbers of people through a building.

== Baroque palaces ==
In a Baroque palace, access down an enfilade suite of state rooms was typically restricted by the rank or degree of intimacy of the visitor. The first rooms were more public, and at the end was normally the bedroom, sometimes with an intimate cabinet or boudoir beyond. Baroque protocol dictated that visitors of lower rank than their host would be escorted by servants down the enfilade to the furthest room their status allowed. If the visitor was of equal or higher rank, the host would advance down the enfilade to meet their guest, before taking the visitor back.

At parting, the same ritual would be observed, although the host might pay their guest a compliment by taking them back further than their rank strictly dictated. If a person of much higher rank visited, these rituals extended past the enfilade to the entrance hall, the gates of the palace, or beyond (in modern state visits, to the airport).

Memoirs and letters of the time often note the exact details of where meetings and partings occurred, even to whether they were in the centre of the room, or at the door.

== Royal palaces ==
Royal palaces often had separate enfiladed state apartments for the king and queen, as at the Palace of Versailles, with the grand appartement du roi and the grand appartement de la reine (not to mention the petit appartement du roi), or at Hampton Court Palace. Such suites were also used for entertaining.

Noblemen's houses, especially if a visit from the monarch was hoped for, often feature enfiladed suites, as at Chatsworth House, Blenheim Palace, the Château de Louveciennes, or Boughton House. The bedrooms in such suites were often only slept in on royal visits, although as with many grand bedrooms before the 19th century, they might be used for other purposes. Other enfilades culminated in a room used as a throne room. The Palace of Westminster comes into this category, as the monarch sits on a throne in the chamber of the House of Lords during the State Opening of Parliament.

== Palace of Westminster ==
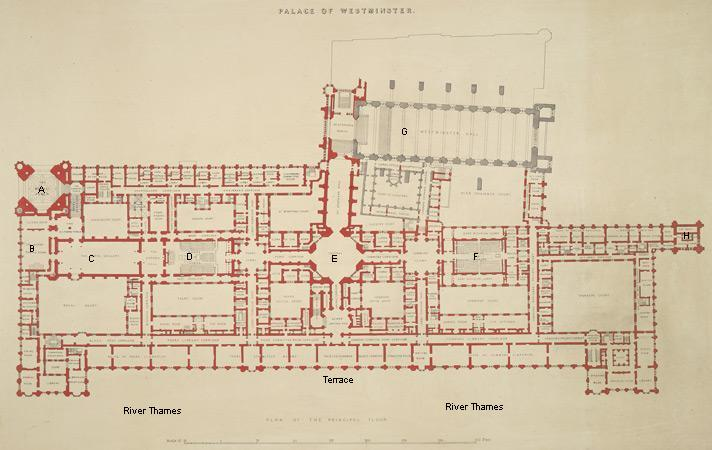
In the Palace of Westminster there is an uninterrupted view from the Peers' Chamber (D), right through Central Lobby (E), to the Commons Chamber(F)

Sir Charles Barry's Palace of Westminster, more commonly known as the Houses of Parliament, has an enfilade of three royal apartments that continues through the two legislative Chambers of the Lords and Commons. The enfilade of state rooms presents a view from the Robing Room and Royal Gallery – B and C on the plan – through to the Prince's Chamber. From the throne in the adjacent Lords' Chamber (D) there is an uninterrupted view through three lobbies – Lords', Central, and Members' Lobby – to the Speaker's Chair in the Commons Chamber at the other end of the Palace. Lords' Lobby and Members' Lobby are the round and square spaces to the left and right of E on the Plan.

== National Gallery, London ==
Barry also used a number of enfilades in his extension to the National Gallery, London, built as an art gallery. These have been extended and added to in the recent Sainsbury Wing (despite the wing being at an angle to the earlier building), so that now the view down the longest enfilade traverses fifteen rooms.

== Gallery ==
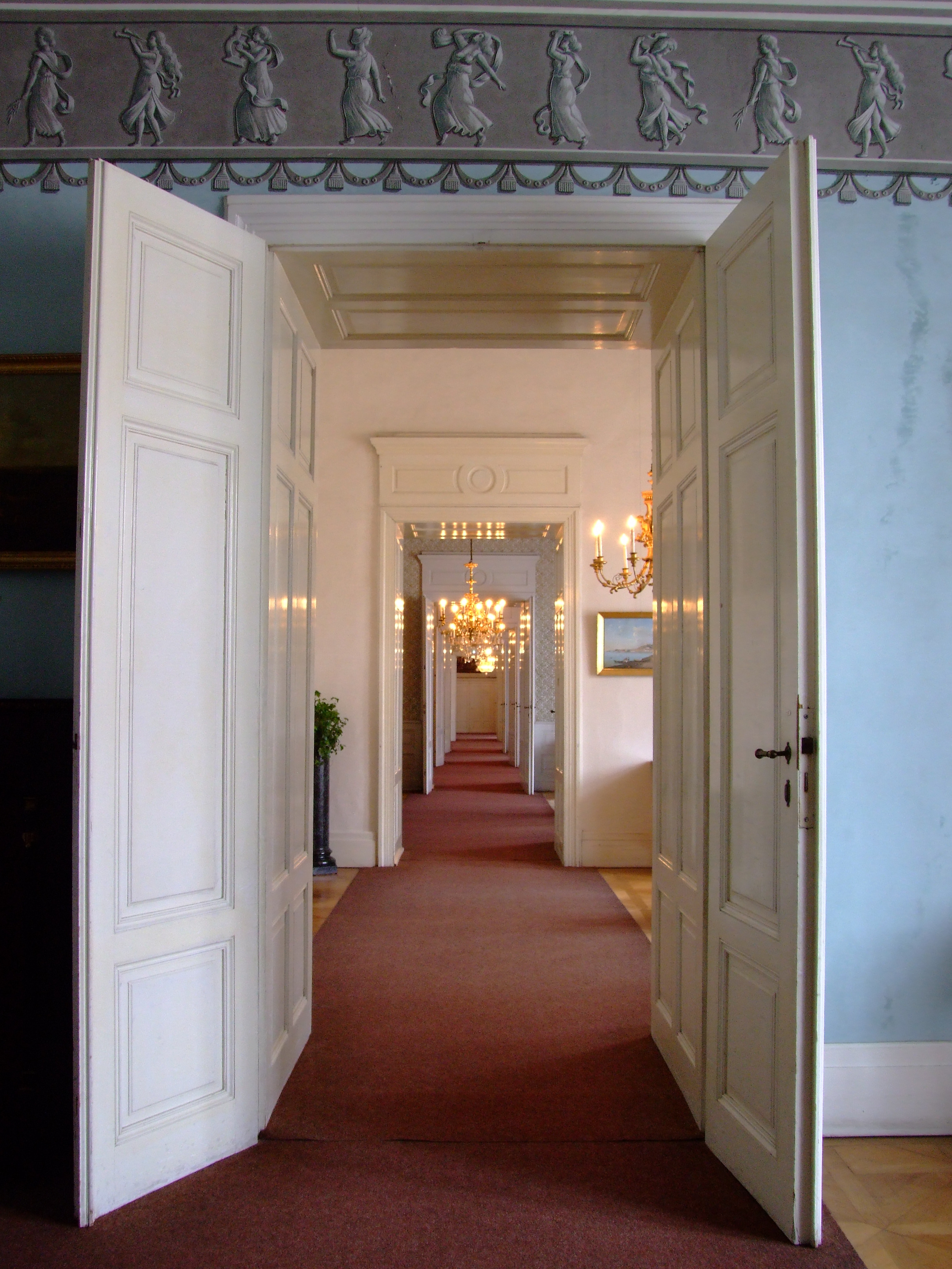
View through an enfilade at Opočno Castle in the Czech Republic

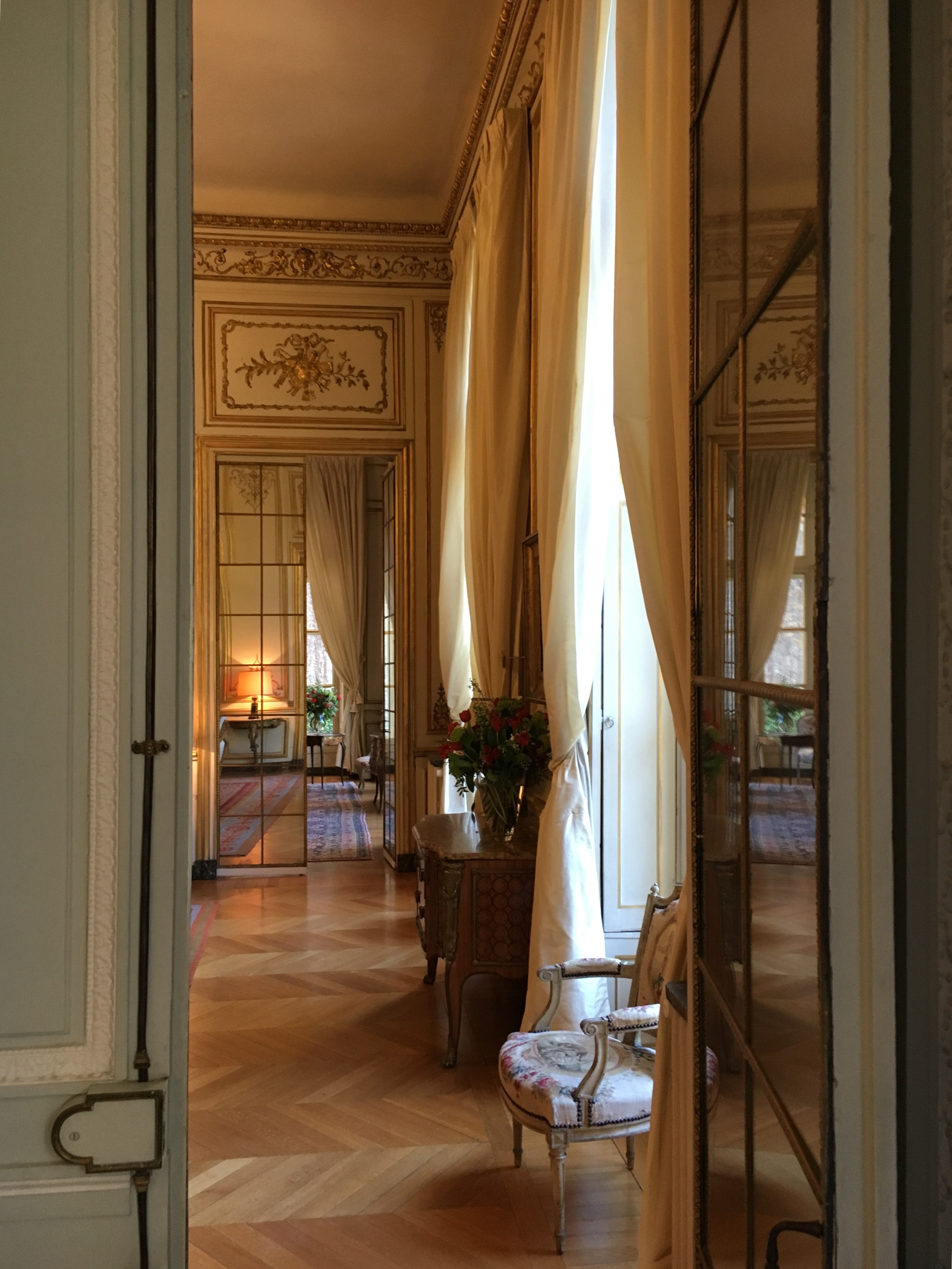
The enfilade at the Hôtel de Besenval in Paris

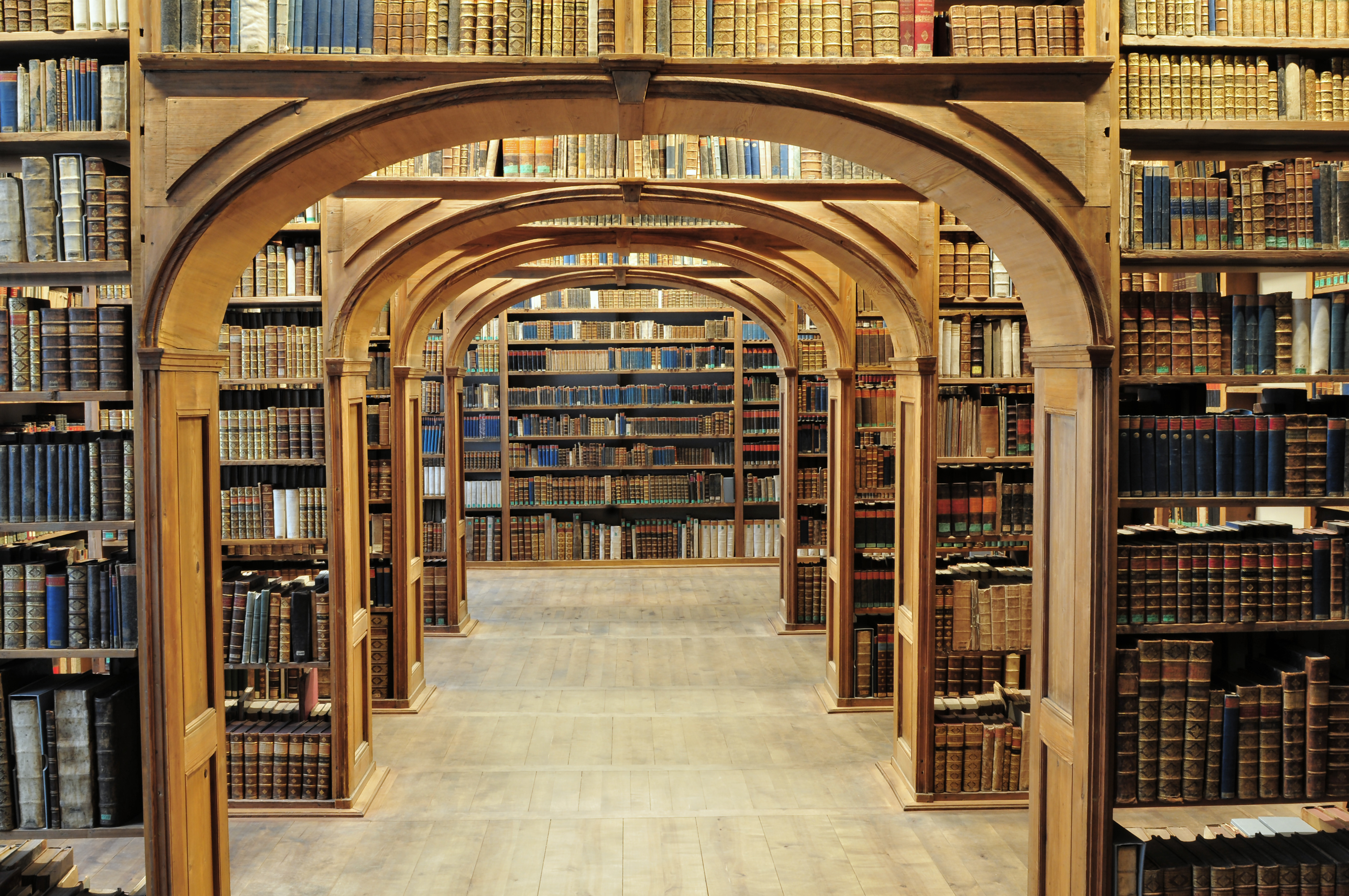
Enfilade at Upper Lusatian Library of Sciences in Saxony

== See also ==
- Shotgun house – similar design in vernacular nineteenth- and twentieth-century American architecture
