= Cabinet (room) =

Private room in houses and palaces of early modern Europe

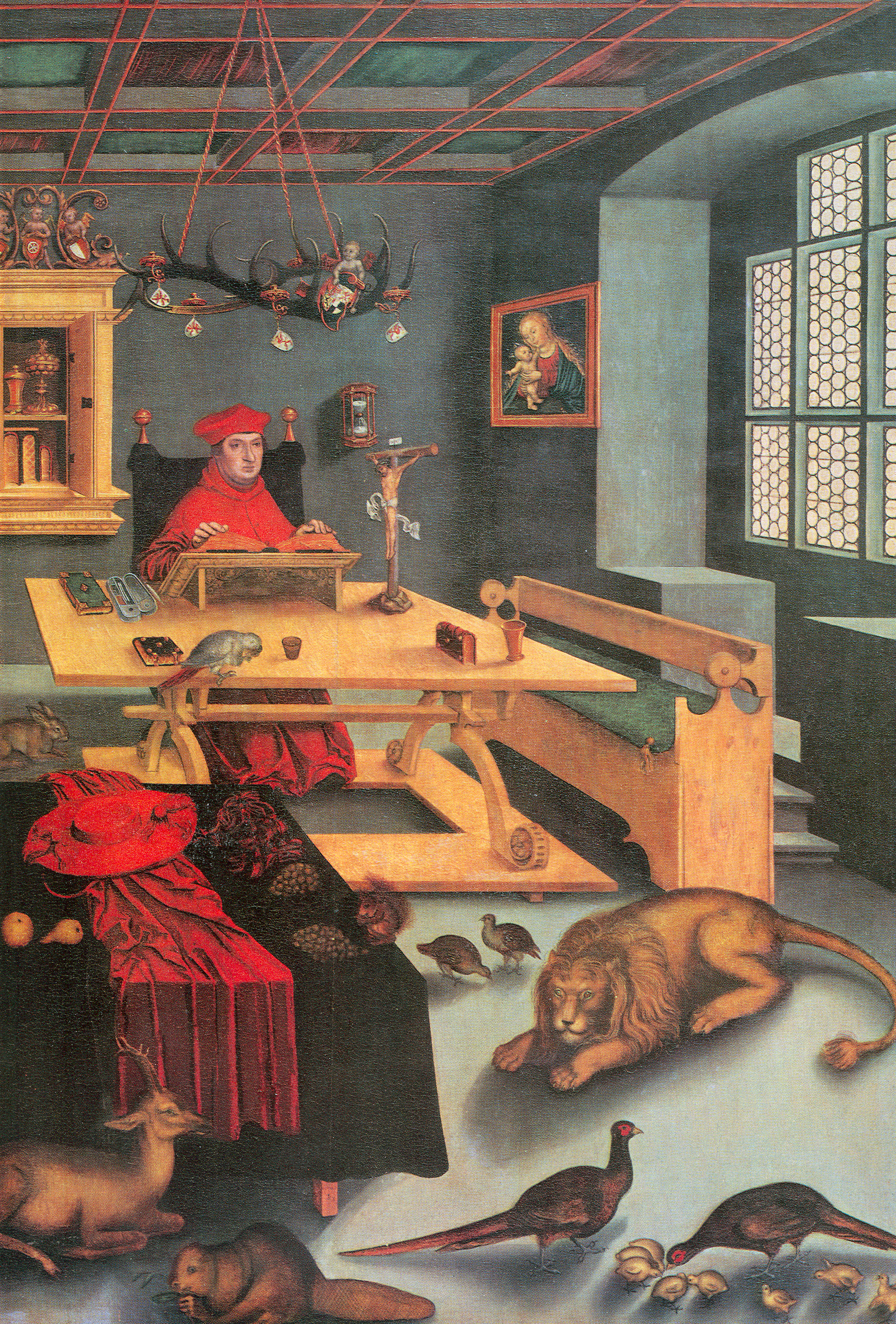
Cardinal Albrecht of Brandenburg as Saint Jerome (with friends) in his study by Lucas Cranach the Elder, 1526.

A cabinet (also known by other terms) was a private room in the houses and palaces of early modern Europe serving as a study or retreat, usually for a man. The cabinet would be furnished with books and works of art, and sited adjacent to his bedchamber, the equivalent of the Italian Renaissance studiolo. In the Late Medieval period, such newly perceived requirements for privacy had been served by the solar of the English gentry house, and a similar, less secular purpose had been served by a private oratory.

Such a room might be used as a study or office, or just a sitting room. Heating the main rooms in large palaces or mansions in the winter was difficult, and small rooms were more comfortable. They also offered more privacy from servants, other household members, and visitors. Typically such a room would be for the use of a single individual, so that a house might have at least two (his and hers) and often more. Names varied: cabinet, closet, study (from the Italian studiolo), office, and a range of more specifically female equivalents, such as a boudoir.

== Studiolo ==
With its origins in requirements for increased privacy for reading and meditation engendered by the humanist avocation of many of the Italian noble and mercantile elite in the Quattrocento, the studiolo provided a retreat often reachable only through the, comparatively public, bedroom. This was true for the elaborate Studiolo of Francesco I de' Medici located in Palazzo Vecchio, Florence.

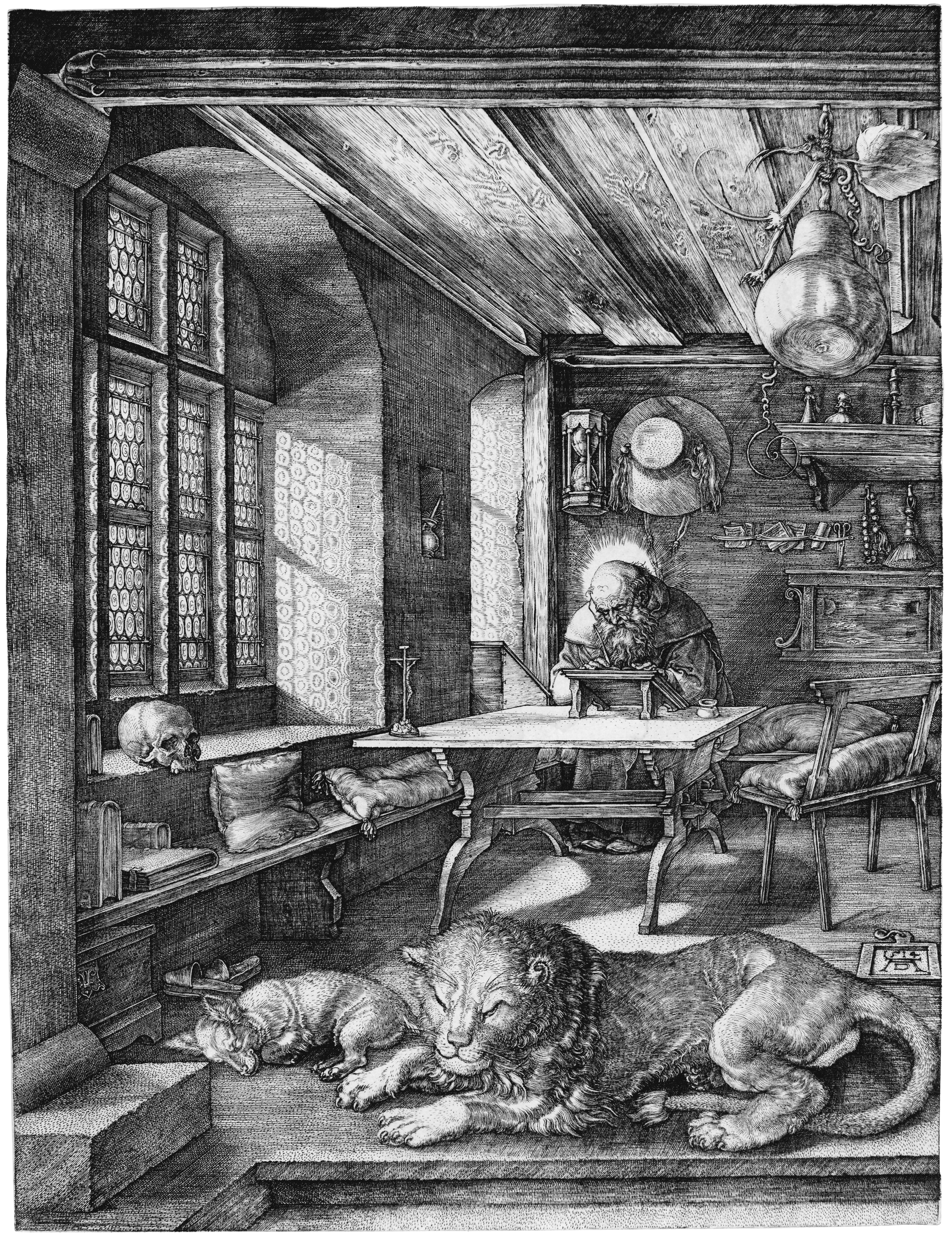
Saint Jerome in His Study, 1514, by Albrecht Dürer

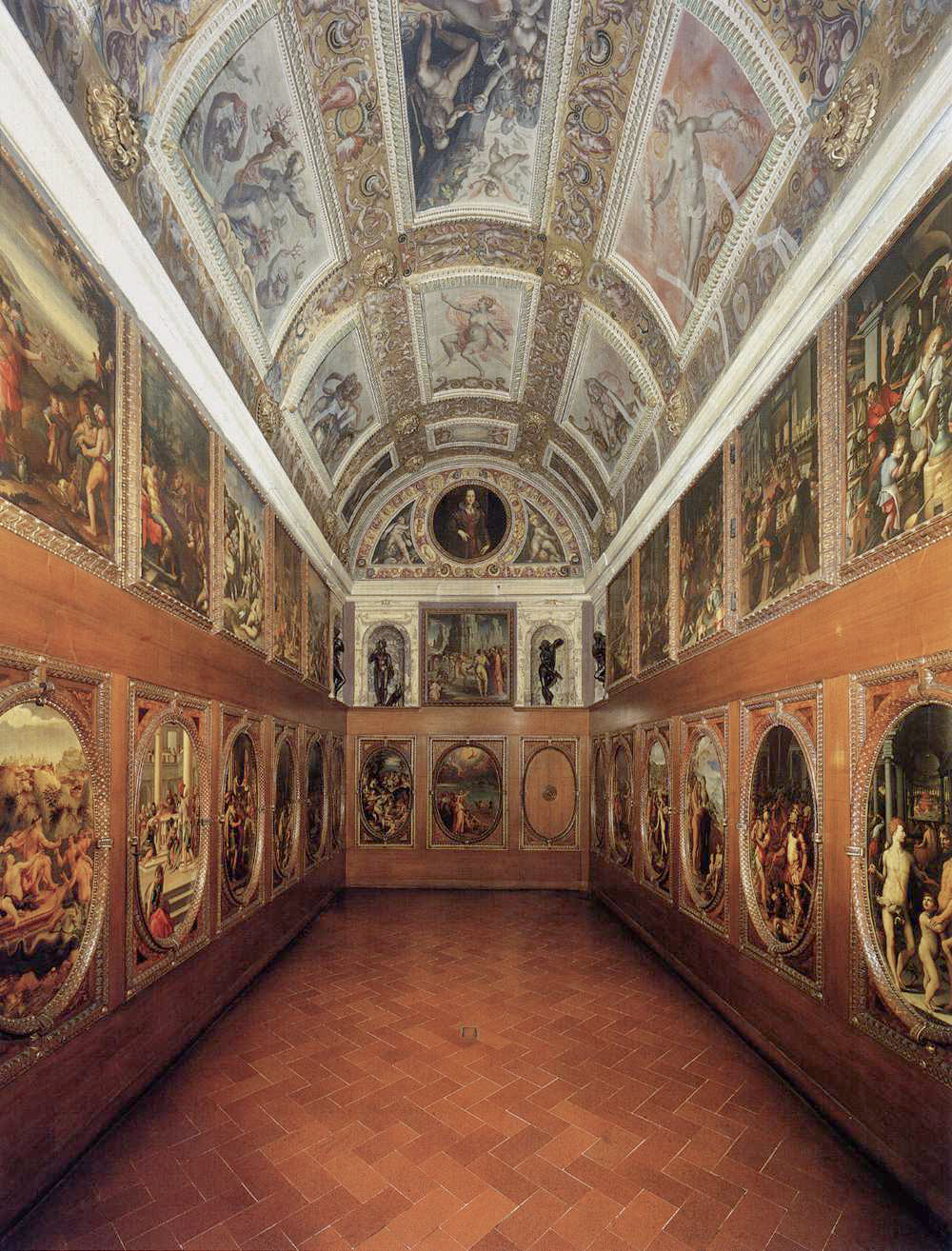
The richly decorated Studiolo of Francesco I

The standard fittings of the late medieval and early modern study can be inventoried among the conventional trappings in portrayals of Saint Jerome in illuminated manuscripts, in paintings, or in engravings like those of Albrecht Dürer (illustration): a chair; perhaps a footstool to lift the feet from the draughty floor; a portable desk with a slanted surface for writing; and a table, bearing a book-rest, perhaps with a weighted ribbon to hold a book open at a place, and a candlestick (to supplement the light from the window, which is often shuttered but also which often has a window seat in the depth of the wall). In Domenico Ghirlandaio's Saint Jerome in his Study, shelving runs around the room at the level of the frieze, on it are curious objects, containers of various types, and large volumes lying on their sides.

Studioli entirely inlaid in intarsia for the ducal palaces of Urbino (in situ) and Gubbio (remounted at the Metropolitan Museum of Art) with simulated shelves and built-in cabinets filled with books, scientific instruments and examples of geometric solids, all rendered in striking trompe-l'œil evoke the character of the pursuits of the cabinet. For Ferdinando Gonzaga's studiolo at Mantua, in about 1619, Domenico Fetti painted a series of New Testament parables, suitable for private contemplation; they proved very popular, and Fetti and his studio, and Fetti's imitators, repeated them for other similar retreats. Isabella d'Este called her room with paintings commissioned from Andrea Mantegna, Perugino and others a studiolo.

A studiolo would often have a Latin motto painted or inlaid round the frieze. Heraldry and personal devices and emblems would remind the occupant of his station in life. Series of portraits of exemplary figures were popular, whether the Nine Worthies or the classical philosophers, in imaginary ideal portrait heads.

Perhaps the grandest studiolo was the Camerino ("little room") of Alfonso d'Este in Ferrara, for which the greatest painters of the day were commissioned from about 1512-1525 to paint mythological canvases, very large by the standards of the time. Fra Bartolommeo died before starting work, and Raphael got no further than a drawing, but Giovanni Bellini completed The Feast of the Gods (NGA, Washington) in 1514. Titian was then brought in and added three of his finest works: Bacchus and Ariadne (National Gallery, London), The Andrians and The Worship of Venus (both Prado, Madrid), as well as repainting the background of the Bellini to match his own works better. Dosso Dossi, Alphonso's court painter, completed the room with a large painting (now lost) and ten small oblong subjects to go as a frieze above the others.

== Closet ==
In Elizabethan England, such a private retreat would most likely be termed a closet, the most recent in a series of developments in which people of means found ways to withdraw by degrees from the public life of the household as it was lived in the late medieval great hall. This sense of "closet" has continued use in the term "closet drama", which is a literary work in the form of theatre, intended not to be mounted nor publicly presented, but to be read and visualised in privacy. Two people in intimate private conversation are sometimes said to be "closetted together". In his closet at Christ Church, Oxford, Robert Burton wrote The Anatomie of Melancholy (1621).

Cabinet in English was often used for strongrooms, or treasure-stores - the tiny but exquisite Elizabethan tower strongroom at Lacock Abbey might have been so called - but also in the wider sense. David Rizzio was murdered when dining with his putative lover Mary, Queen of Scots in "a cabinet abowte xii footes square, in the same a little low reposinge bedde, and a table".

A rare surviving cabinet, or closet, with its contents probably little changed since the early 18th century, is at Ham House in Richmond, London, England. It is less than 10 feet (3 m) square, and leads off from the Long Gallery, which is well over 100 feet (30 m) long by 20 feet (6 m) wide, giving a rather startling change in scale and atmosphere. As is often the case (at Chatsworth House, for example), it has an excellent view of the front entrance to the house, so that comings and goings can be discreetly observed. Most surviving large houses or palaces, especially from before 1700, have such rooms, but (again as at Chatsworth) they are very often not displayed to visitors.

Since the reign of King George I, the Cabinet – derived from the room – has been the principal executive group of British government, and the term has been adopted in most English-speaking countries. Phrases such as "cabinet counsel", meaning advice given in private to the monarch, occur from the late 16th century, and, given the non-standardized spelling of the day, it is often hard to distinguish whether "council" or "counsel" is meant. The OED credits Francis Bacon in his Essays (1605) with the first use of "Cabinet council", where it is described as a foreign habit, of which he disapproves: "For which inconveniences, the doctrine of Italy, and practice of France, in some kings’ times, hath introduced cabinet counsels; a remedy worse than the disease."

Charles I began a formal "Cabinet Council" from his accession in 1625, as his Privy Council, or "private council", was evidently not private enough, and the first recorded use of "cabinet" by itself for such a body comes from 1644, and is again hostile and associates the term with dubious foreign practices. The process has repeated itself in recent times, as leaders have felt the need to have a Kitchen Cabinet. Figurative uses of closet have developed in a different direction.

== Cabinet ==
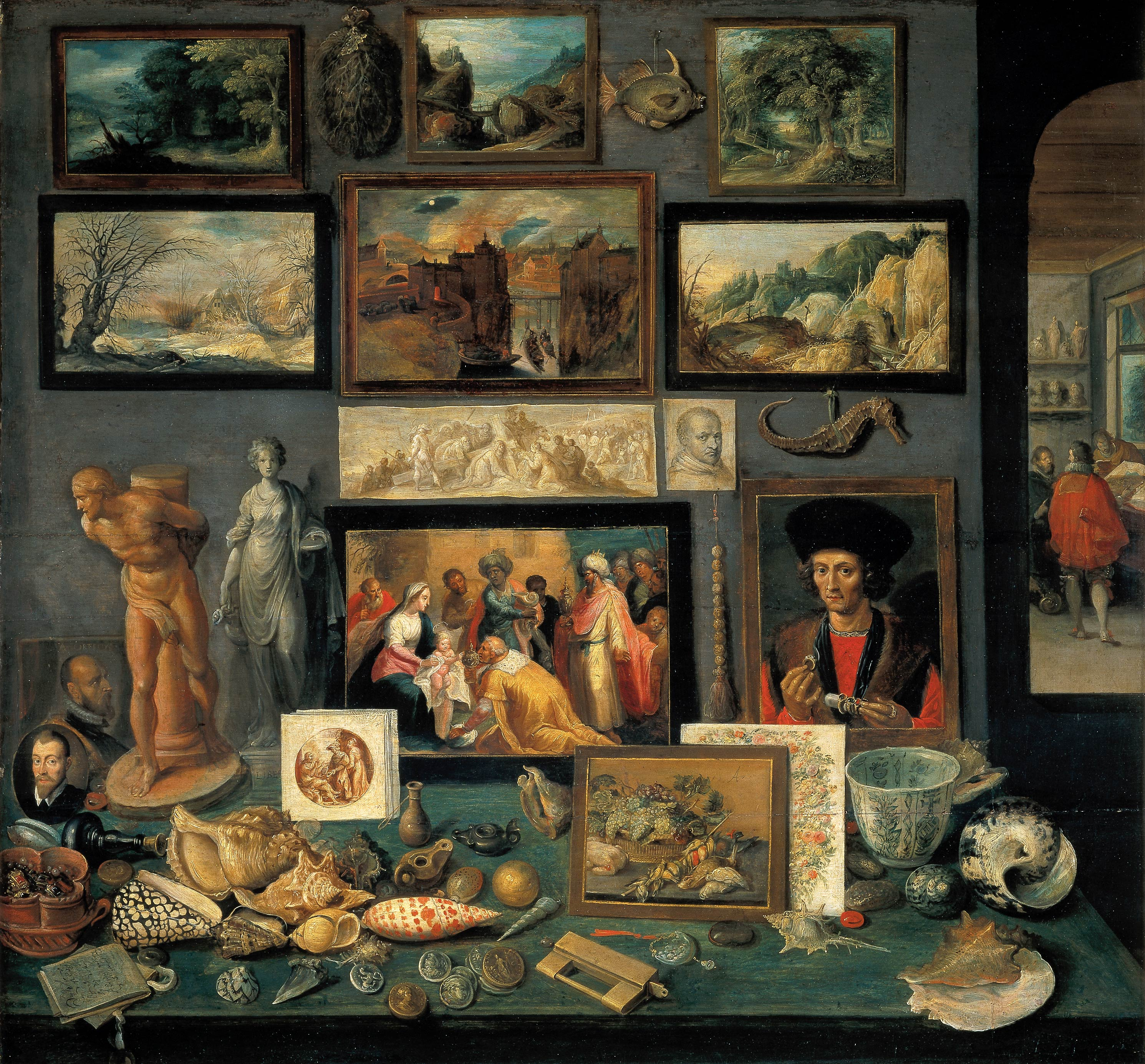
A corner of a cabinet of curiosities, painted by Frans II Francken in 1636 reveals the range of connoisseurship of a Baroque-era virtuoso.

In the cabinet as it evolved in French Baroque architecture, the last in the standardised series of rooms that constituted a Baroque apartment, the walls would be hung with rich textiles as a background for cabinet pictures, those small works, often on copper or wood panel, that required intimate study for appreciation, among which would also be devotional pictures. Especially wealthy or aristocratic people may have had a series of cabinets in a suite.

At Vaux-le-Vicomte, the architect Le Vau contrived a jewel-like private cabinet for the king's minister of finance Nicolas Fouquet that was entirely hung with panels of Venetian looking-glass; later, Louis XIV's Grand Cabinet at Versailles (swept away in 18th-century revisions in the name of even more private royal spaces) was similarly mirror-lined: "the king's self-directed gaze was at once religious and narcissistic" as Orest Ranum has observed.

Versailles has a large assortment of cabinets en filade for the king located behind and adjacent to his formal bedchamber, the Petit appartement du roi. The cabinet is the male equivalent of a boudoir, and at Versailles and the baroque palaces and great country houses that echoed it, a parallel apartment would be provided for the royal or noble consort; at Versailles the Petit appartement de la reine. Even in the cramped confines of a London house, Samuel Pepys and his wife each had a bedchamber and a "closet"; with a common sitting room, or "drawing room", these were the minimum that genteel baroque arrangements required.

The meaning of "cabinet" began to be extended to the contents of the cabinet; thus we see the 16th-century cabinet of curiosities, often combined with a library. The sense of cabinet as a piece of furniture is actually older in English than the meaning as a room, but originally meant more a strong-box or jewel-chest than a display-case.
