= Passemant astronomical clock =

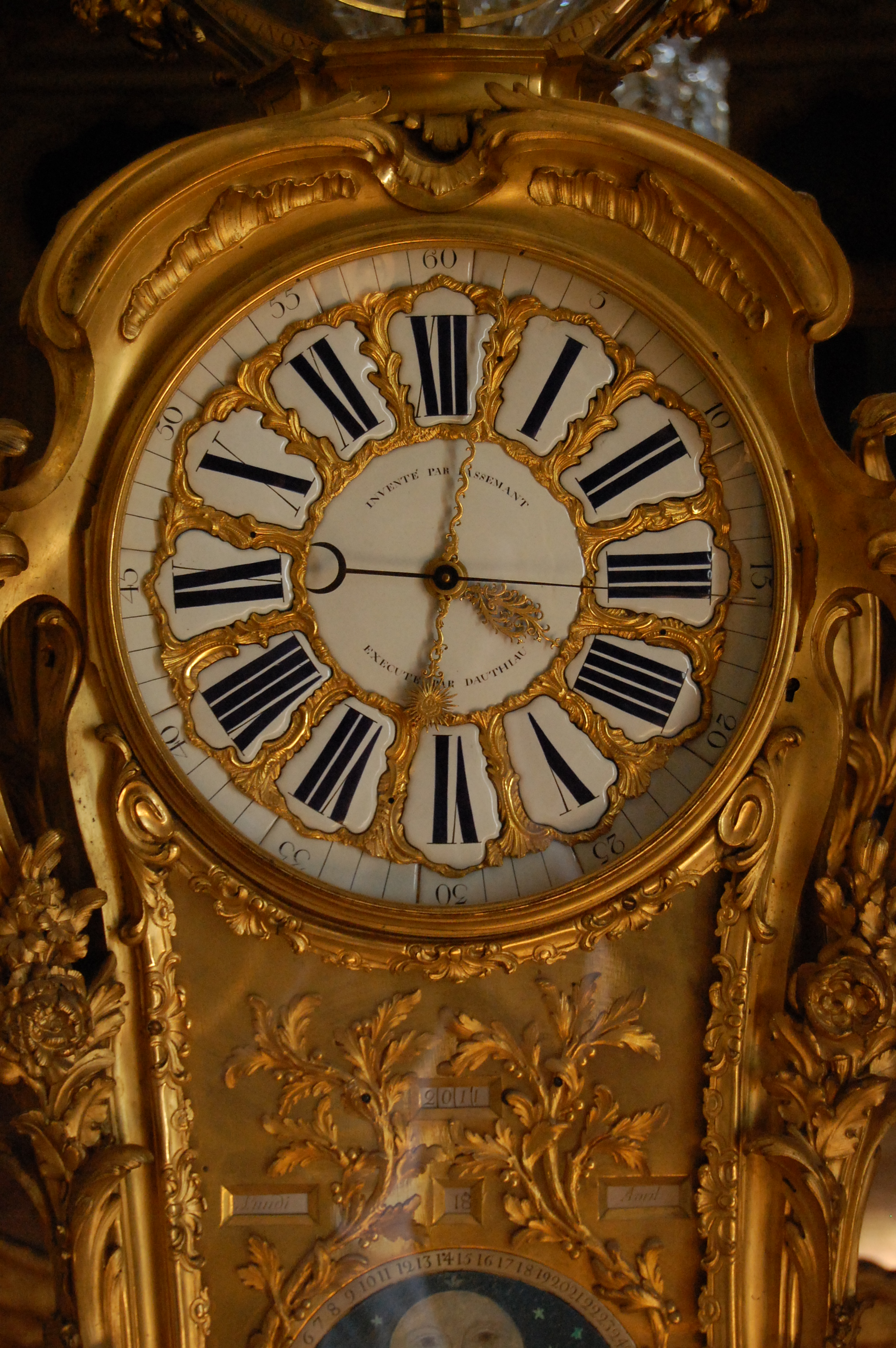
Clockface

The Passemant astronomical clock is an astronomical clock designed by Claude-Simeon Passemant in the eighteenth century. It is displayed in the Salon de la pendule in the petit appartement du roi on the first floor of Versailles, France. The clock set the official time in France for the first time in the kingdom's history.

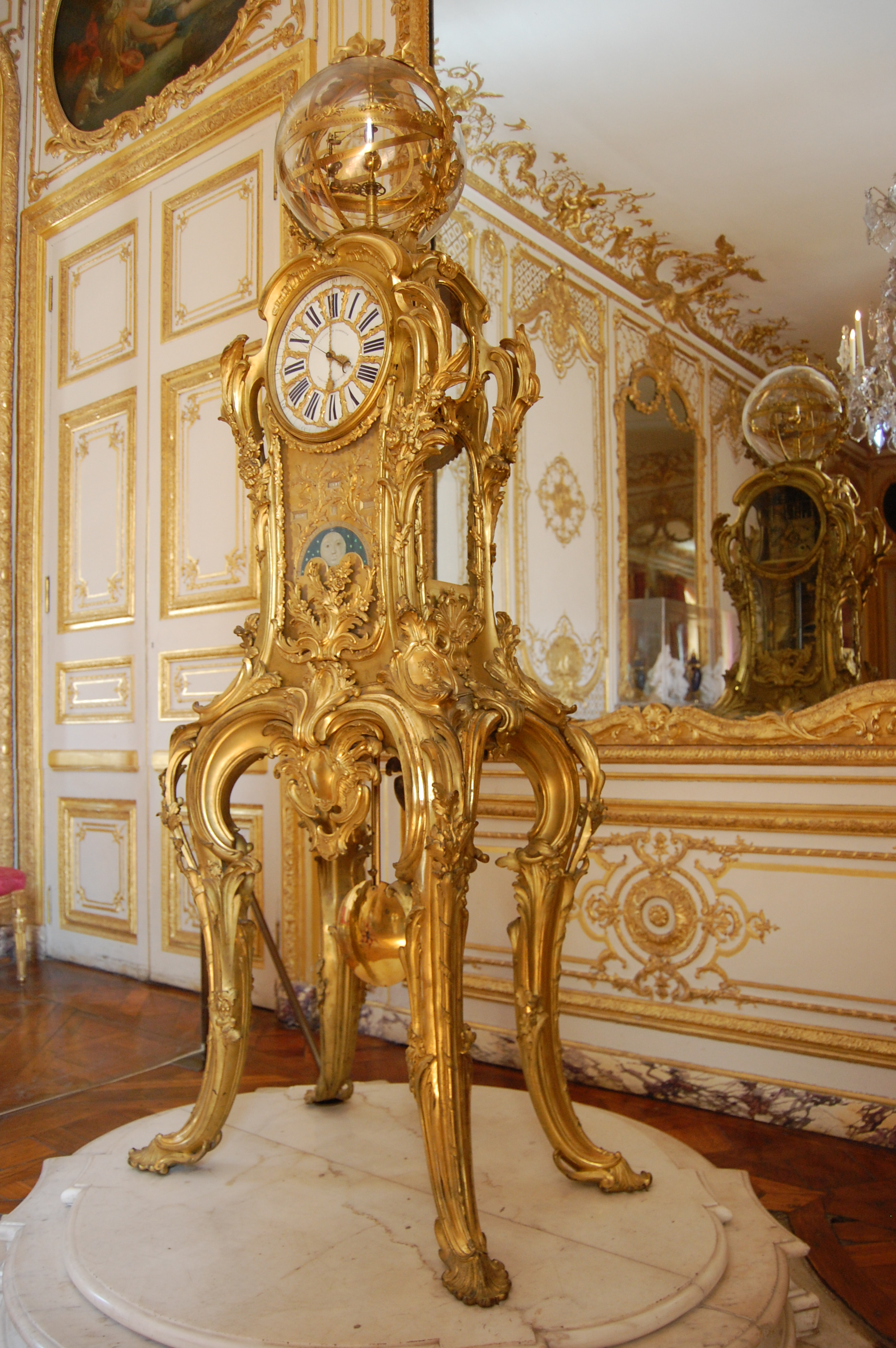
Passemant astronomical clock

== Description ==
The clock is an exceptional rococo work over 2 metres (6 ft 7 in) in height, crowned with a moving celestial sphere. It shows the date, time, real time average phases of the moon and Copernican planetary motion. The large astronomical dials mark the rising and setting of the sun and moon every day. Earth is represented by a bronze globe on which all countries are engraved with the main cities. This globe is placed among the rocks and waterfalls, which serve as a universal horizon.

The mechanism is designed to be able to display the date until the end of the year 9999.

== Creators ==
The clock mechanism was designed by engineer Claude-Siméon Passemant (1702–1769) and executed by the clockmaker Louis Dauthiau (1730–1809). The rococo-style gilt-bronze box protecting the mechanism was made in 1753 by sculptor Jean-Jacques Caffieri (1735–1792) and bronze-founder Philippe Caffieri.

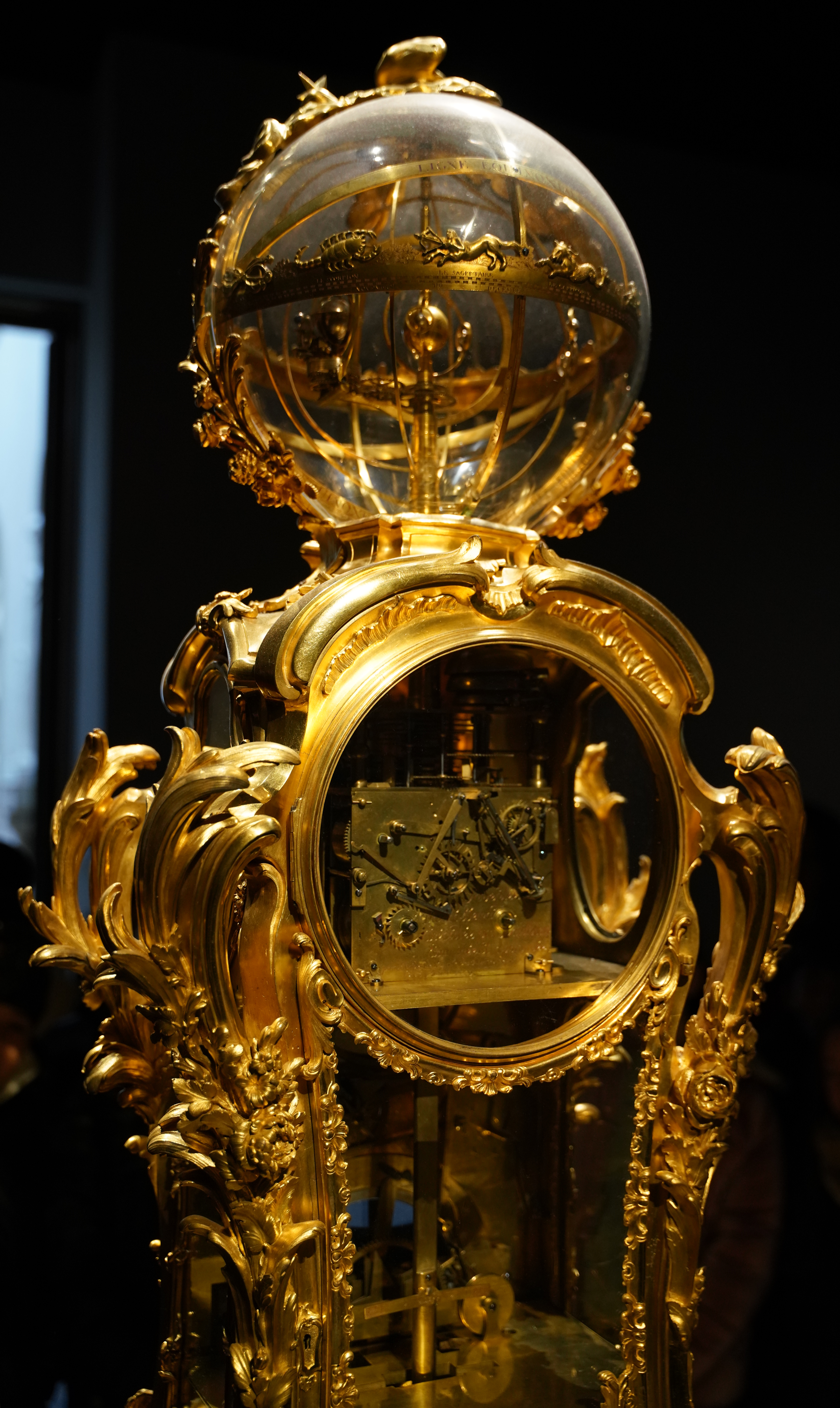
Backface

== History ==
After being reviewed and approved by the French Academy of Sciences in August 1749, the clock was presented to Louis XV in Choisy by the duc de Chaulnes on 7 September 1750. The King acquired it the same year. In January 1754, the clock took its place among the astronomical clocks of Versailles. The fact that it was placed in the Salon de la pendule demonstrates the interest that Louis XV had in the mechanical arts through clockmaking. Indeed, the room was so named because the dials of clocks were set into the wall panelling.

== See also ==
- Gnomon of Saint-Sulpice
