= Petit appartement du roi =

Suite in the Palace of Versailles, France

Coordinates: 48°48′17.5″N 2°7′15″E

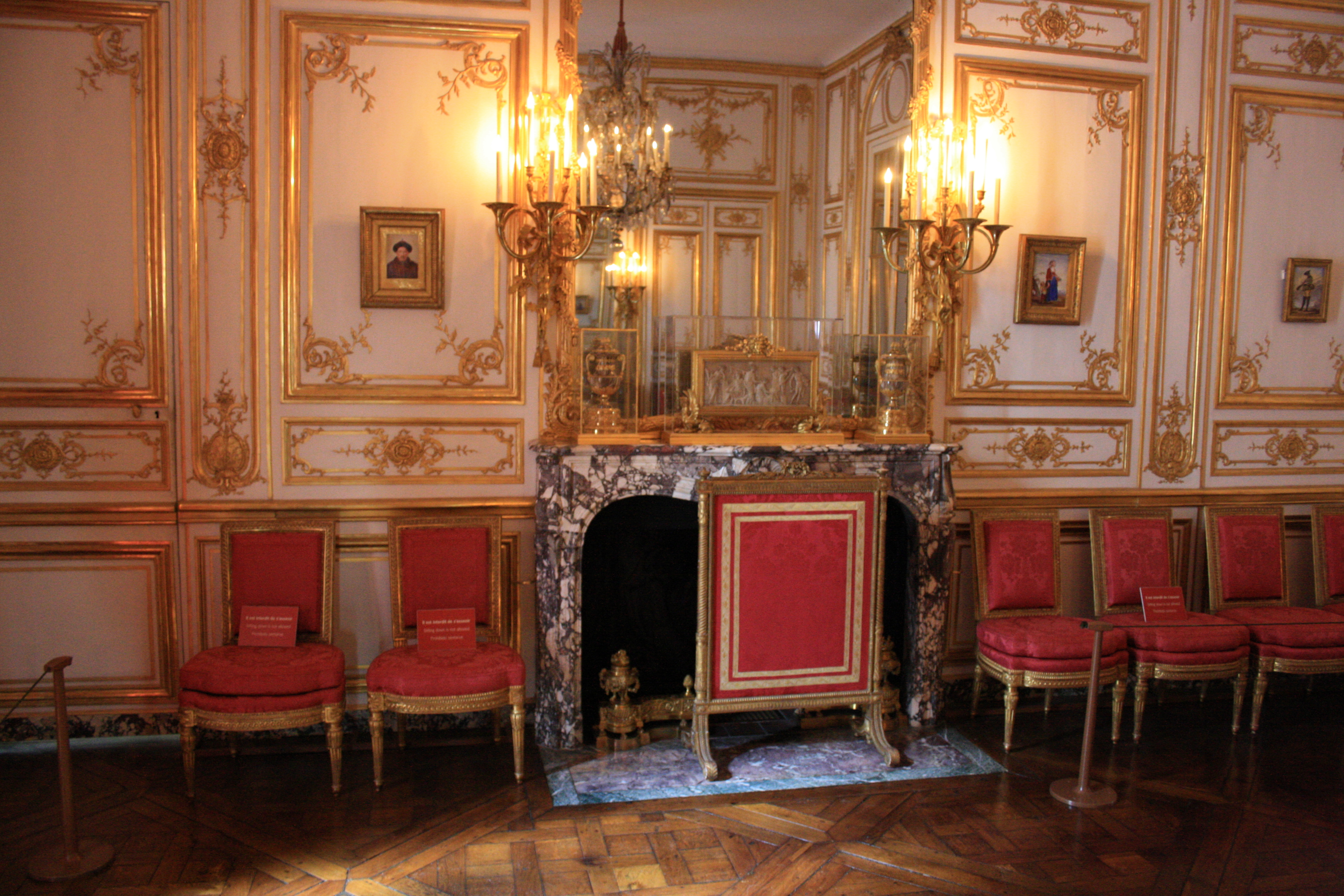
- Cabinet de jeux of Louis XVI
- Building: Palace of Versailles
- Country: France

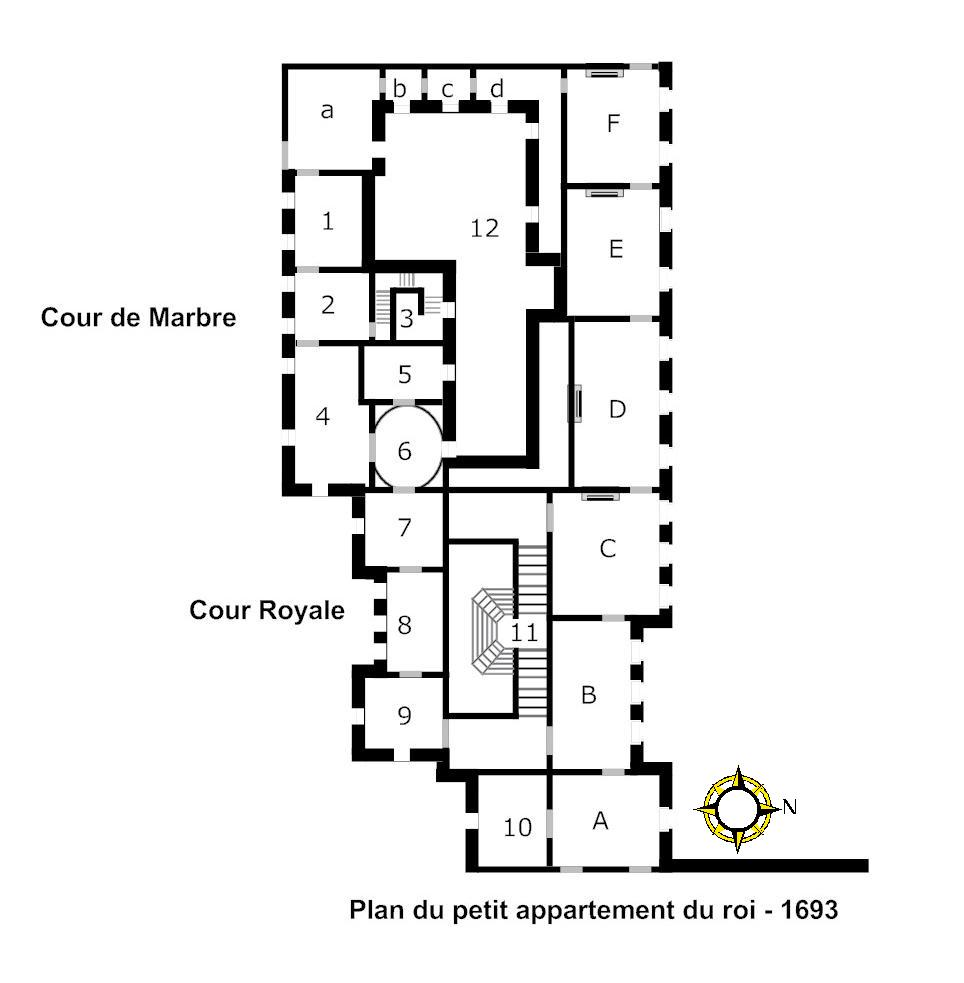
- The petit appartement du roi ca. 1693

Key to the plan of the petit appartement du roi
- 1: Salon du billard (cabinet des chiens)
- 2: Salon du degré du roi
- 3: Degré du roi
- 4: Cabinet aux tableaux
- 5: Cabinet des Coquilles (cabinet des livres)
- 6: Salon ovale
- 7: Premier salon de la petite galerie
- 8: Petite galerie
- 9: Deuxième salon de la petite galerie
- 10: Cabinet des Médailles
- 11: Escalier des ambassadeurs
- 12: Cour du roi
- A-F: Grand appartement du roi
- a-d: a) cabinet de perruques; b) garde robe; c) staircase; d) passage to the Salon of Apollo

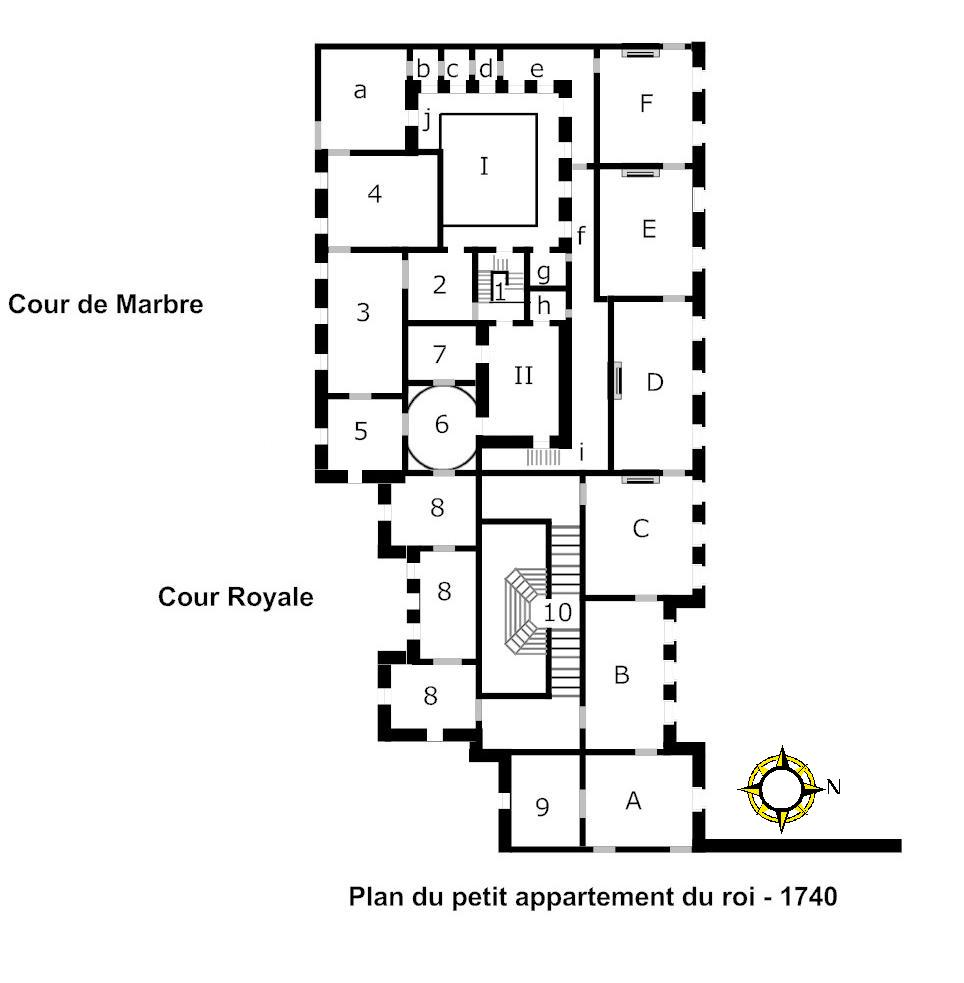
- Plan of the petit appartement du roi ca. 1740

Key to the plan of the petit appartement du roi
- 1: Degré du roi
- 2: Antichambre des chiens
- 3: Salon des pendules
- 4: chambre de Louis XV
- 5: Cabinet intérieur
- 6: Salon ovale
- 7: Cabinet des livres; cabinet en niche
- 8: Petite galerie
- 9: Cabinet des médailles
- 10: Escalier des ambassadeurs
- I: Cour des cerfs (cour du roi)
- II: Cour intérieur
- A-F: Grand appartement du roi
- a-h: a) cabinet de perruques; b) cabinet particulier du roi; c) cabinet de la chaise; d) staircase; e) cabinet-doré; f) corridor; g) salle des bains; h) salle des cuves

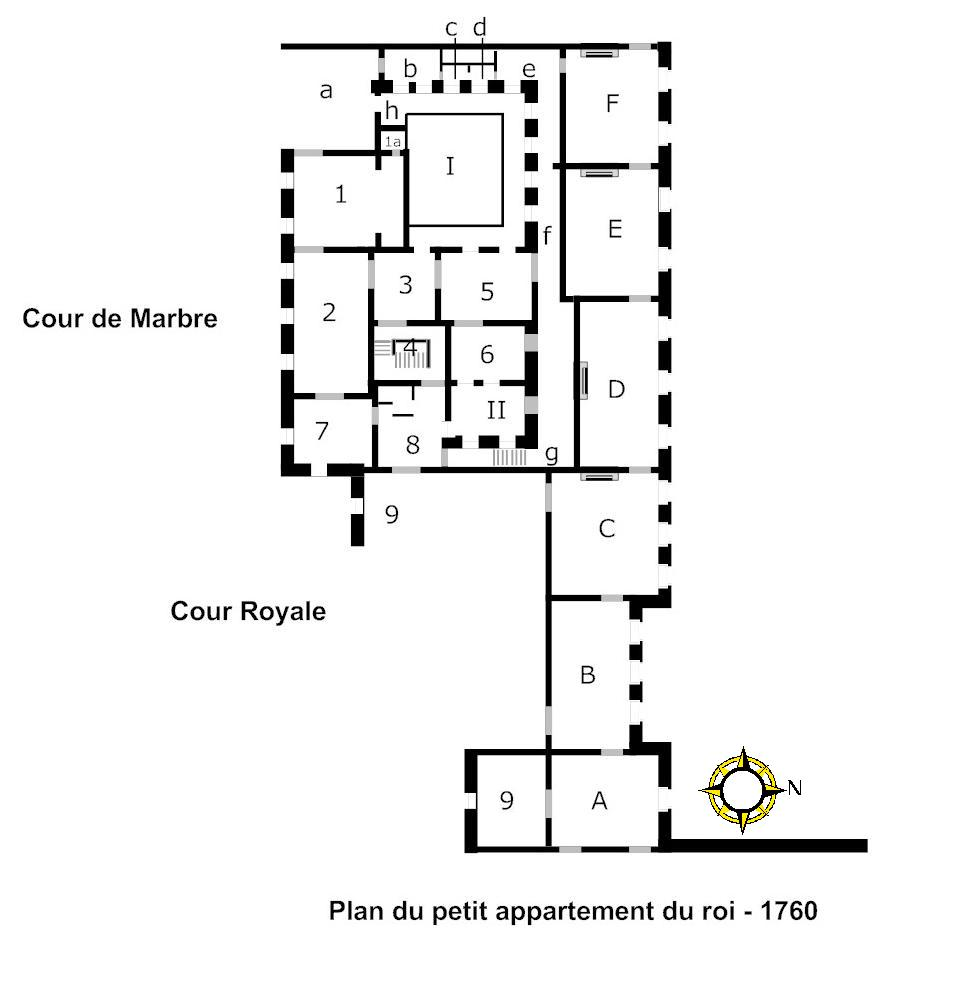
- Plan of the petit appartement du roi ca. 1760

Key to the plan of the petit appartement du roi
- 1; 1a: Chambre de Louis XV; 1a garde-robe
- 2: Salon de la pendule
- 3: Antichambre des chiens
- 4: Degré du roi
- 5: Salle à manger aux retours de chasses
- 6: Pièce des buffets
- 7: Cabinet intérieur
- 8: Arrière cabinet
- 9: Appartement de Madame Adéliëde
- A-F: Grand appartement du roi
- I: Cour des cerfs
- II: Cour intérieur
- a-h: a) Salon du conseil; b) cabinet de la tour; c) cabinet de la chaise; d) staircase; e) cabinet-doré; f) corridor; g) degré de l’Epernon; h) terrace

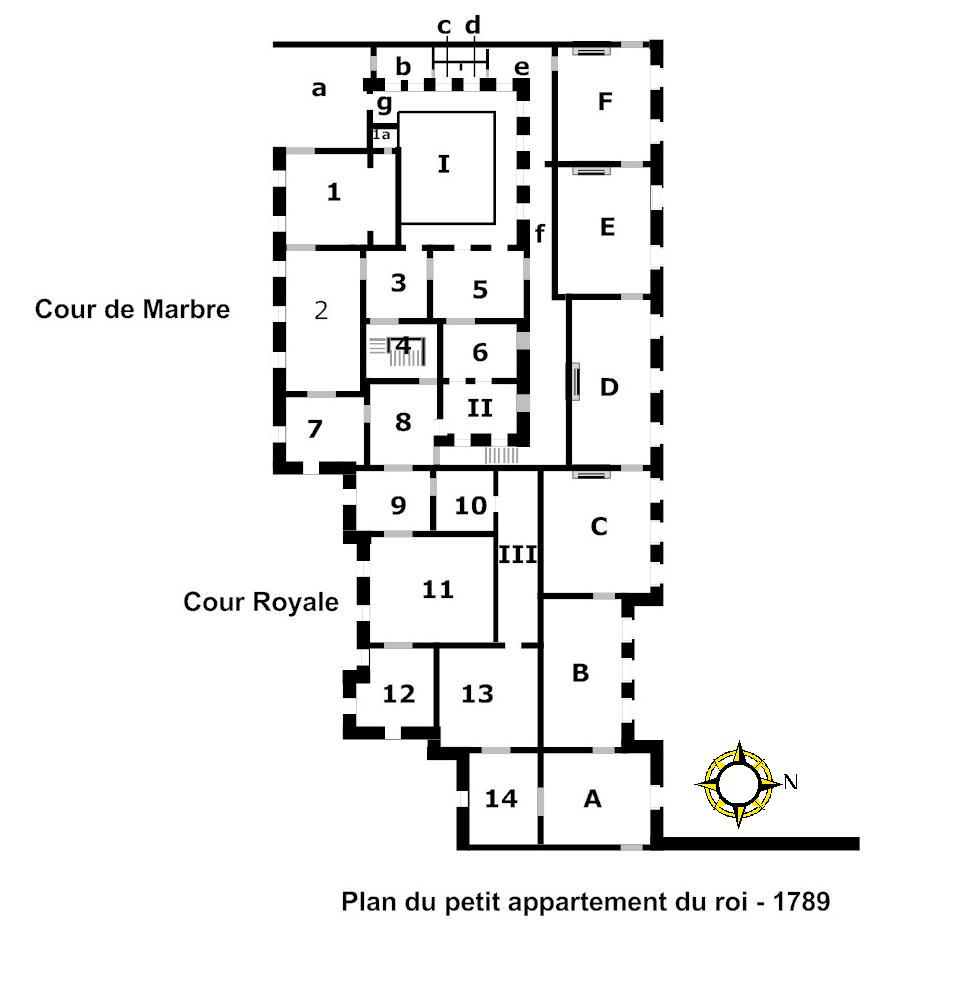
- Plan of the petit appartement du roi ca. 1789

Key to the plan of the petit appartement du roi
- 1; 1a: Chambre de Louis XV; garde-robe
- 2: Salon de la pendule
- 3: Antichambre des chiens
- 4: Degré du roi
- 5: Salle à manger aux retours de chasses
- 6: Pièce des buffets
- 7: Cabinet intérieur
- 8: Cabinet des dépêches
- 9: Pièce de la vaiselle d’or
- 10: Cabinet de la cassette
- 11: Bibliothèque de Louis XVI
- 12: Salle à manger aux salles neuves
- 13: Pièce des buffets
- 14: Cabinet des jeux
- I: Cour des cerfs
- II: Cour intérieur
- III: Cave du roi
- a-f: a) Salon du conseil; b) cabinet des bains; c) staircase; d) cabinet de la chaise; e) cabinet de la géographie; f) bibliothèque et cabinet de l’artillerie; g) terrace
- A-F: Grand appartement du roi

The petit appartement du roi (French: [pɛtit‿apaʁtmɑ̃ dy ʁwa]) of the Palace of Versailles is a suite of rooms used by Louis XIV, Louis XV, and Louis XVI. Located on the first floor of the palace, the rooms are found in the oldest part of the palace dating from the reign of Louis XIII. Under Louis XIV, these rooms housed the King's collections of artworks and books, forming a museum of sorts. Under Louis XV and Louis XVI, the rooms were modified to accommodate private living quarters. At this time, the rooms were transformed and their decoration represent some of the finest extant examples of the Louis XV style and Louis XVI style at Versailles (Kimball, 1943).

== Louis XIV ==
Beginning in 1678, Louis XIV began to modify these rooms for his particular private needs. The configuration of the rooms dating from the time of Louis XIII was modified. The most significant alteration for this era was the relocation of the degré du roi from the exterior cour de marbre to the interior cour du roi. This relocation of the staircase precipitated the rearrangement of rooms in this part of the château to become the petit appartement du roi. In 1684, as the influence of Louis’ mistress – Françoise-Athénaïs, marquise de Montespan – waned due to her alleged involvement in the Affair of the Poisons, the king attached her rooms to his petit appartement after the marquise moved into the appartement des bains on the ground floor of the palace (Le Guillou, 1986; Verlet 1985, pp. 227–228).

In Louis XIV's day, these rooms – cabinets de curiosités – formed a veritable museum for the king's private collections. In contrast to the grand appartement du roi and the appartement du roi, which were open to members of the court and the general public, the petit appartement du roi was only accessible though the personal consent of the king (Bluche, 1991).

Located on the first floor on the northern side of the cour de marbre, the petit appartement du roi comprised nine rooms:

- Salle du billard (cabinet des chiens)
- Salon du degré du roi
- Cabinet aux tableaux
- Cabinet des Coquilles (later cabinet des livres)
- Salon ovale
- Premier salon de la petite galerie
- Petite galerie
- Deuxième salon de la petite galerie
- Cabinet des Médailles

The salle du billiard (1693 plan #1) contained a billiard table, a game at which Louis XIV was adept. Additionally, the King kept several of his hunting dogs in this room so that he could care for them personally, which gave rise to the room's other name: cabinet des chiens (Verlet 1985, p. 227).

The salon du degré du roi (1693 plan #2) occupies the site of a staircase dating from the time of Louis XIII. By 1684 (Dangeau), a new staircase – the degré du roi (1693 plan #3) – had been constructed just north of the old staircase in the cour du roi. The salon du degré du roi served as entrance to the staircase that was reserved for Louis XIV's personal use. The decoration of this room was given over almost exclusively to paintings by Nicolas Poussin (Félibien, 66; Piganiole de la Force, 126)

The cabinet aux tableaux (1693 plan #4) with its southern exposure served as a Pinacotheca for part of Louis XIV's collection of paintings. Among the masters displayed in the room were the works from the Italian schools by Correggio, Raphael, Giorgione, Giulio Romano and Titian. Additionally, there were cabinets arranged in the room in which Louis XIV kept his collection of carved rock crystal (Brejon de Lavergnée, 1985; Félibien, 67; Piganiole de la Force, 129; Verlet 1985, p. 229).

In 1692, the cabinet des coquilles (1693 plan #5) and the salon ovale (1693 plan #6) were created. These rooms, along with cabinet des médailles formed the main rooms of the Louis XIV's cabinets de curiosités. In addition to some of the most highly prized paintings of the royal collection, the salon ovale housed in four niches four bronze sculptural groups – “Jupiter” and “Juno” by Allesandro Algardi; the “Abduction of Orithyia” after the marble by Gaspard Marsy, and the “Abduction of Persephone” by François Girardon – that were esteemed as some of the finest of this genre in the King's collection. The richness of the decoration – fully gilt paneling and mirrors – complemented the arrangement of some of the most valuable paintings in Louis XIV's collection (Félibien, 67; Piganiole de la Force, 129; Verlet 1985, p. 229). The cabinet des coquilles originally housed some a portion of the King's gem collection. In 1708, the room was converted into a library – cabinet aux livres – in which Louis XIV kept his collection of rare books and manuscripts (Verlet 1985, p. 230).

The following rooms – premier salon de la petite galerie, petite galerie, and deuxième salon de la petite galerie (1693 plan #7, 8, & 9) – were formed from rooms that the marquise de Montespan occupied before she moved to the appartement des bains in 1684 (Dangeau vol. 1 77–78; Verlet 1985, p. 232). As with the previous rooms, the petite galerie and its two salons housed precious gems and paintings that the king had either inherited or collected. In the years that preceded the War of the League of Augsburg, Louis XIV engaged in an aggressive collecting campaign that necessitated his expanding space at Versailles to display newly acquired works of art (Verlet 1985, p. 229). Pierre Mignard, Charles Le Brun's archrival was charged with the painting of the ceilings of the petite galerie and its two salons (Félibien, 68; Piganiole de la Force, 140; Verlet 1985, p. 233).

In the petite galerie and its two salons, Louis XIV displayed many of the most valued paintings in his collection. The petite galerie was given almost entirely to works by Italian masters with the works by Francesco Albani, Annibale Carracci, Guido Reni and Parmigianino predominating (Piganiole de la Force, 141–149; Verlet 1985, p. 234). The petite galerie also housed the collection of gifts Louis XIV received from foreign embassies; most notable among these diplomatic offerings were the gifts from the Chinese Jesuit, Shen Fu-Tsung (1684), which included an enormous pearl, and the gifts from the Siamese Embassy of 1685-1686 (Josephson, 1926). The premier salon de la petite galerie is of particular importance as it was in this room that Louis XIV kept the painting described by Piganiole de la Force as “Le Portrait de Vie, femme d’un Florentin nommé Giaconde,” better known in English as the Mona Lisa (Piganiole de la Force, 137).

Louis XIV lavished much attention to these rooms intending to have the walls clad with panels inlaid with tortoise shell and lapis-lazuli. However, owing to the financial demands of the War of the League of Augsburg, the plans were abandoned. Nevertheless, the petite gallerie and its two salons were used by Louis XIV for entertaining foreign dignitaries, such as the Crown Prince of Denmark in 1693 and the Elector of Cologne in 1706 (Verlet 1985, p. 233-234).

Of all the rooms that formed the petit apartment du roi during the reign of Louis XIV, the cabinet des médailles (1693 plan #10) was one of the most remarkable of its sort ever assembled in France (Hulftegger, 1954). Taking its name from the 12 cabinets in which Louis XIV's numismatic collections were kept, the cabinet des medailles also housed the King's collections of miniatures by Flemish, Dutch, and German masters, objects of carved porphyry and carved jade, as well as those rare items made of silver or gold (Verlet 1985, p. 230-232). Forming part of Louis XIV's collection of items made of gold was the treasure of the Merovingian king, Childeric I found in Tournai in 1653 and presented to Louis XIV by Leopold I, Holy Roman Emperor in 1665 (Cochet, 1859) and the gold and jewel encrusted nef, which was used by Louis XIV when he dined au grand couvert.

== Louis XV – 1740 ==
After the return of the King and court to Versailles in 1722, life assumed a rhythm similar to that under Louis XIV. The young Louis XV occupied his great-grandfather's bedroom, the chambre de Louis XIV, where the ceremonies of the daily lever and coucher were executed with the same exacting precision as during the reign of the Sun King. However, owing to the discomfort of the room in winter – its size and eastern exposure made it difficult, if not impossible, to heat – Louis XV was compelled to establish his bedroom elsewhere (Verlet 313–314). In 1738, Louis XV ordered a new bedroom – chambre de Louis XV (1740 plan #4) – constructed on the site of |Louis XIV's salle du billard, which was enlarged to the north into the cour du roi to accommodate an alcove for the bed (Verlet 1985, p. 444-447). In the same year, the degré du roi was demolished and a new staircase was built just north of the old location. A new room was constructed on the site formerly occupied by the degré du roi of Louis XIV, the antichambre des chiens (Verlet 1985, p. 442). As with his great-grandfather in his cabinet des chiens, Louis XV kept some of his hunting dogs in this room.

Further modifications of the petit appartement du roi at this time included the creation of the salon des pendules and the cabinet intérieur. These rooms were created when the salon du degré du roi and the cabinet aux tableaux of Louis XIV were destroyed (Le Guillou, 1985).

The salon des pendules (1740 plan #3) (also called the salon ovale due to its elliptic shape) was given this name due to the dials arranged in the apsidal recess of the eastern wall that showed the times of the rising and setting of the sun and the moon (Verlet 1985, p. 450).

The cabinet intérieur (1740 plan #4) served a number of purposes: it housed part of Louis XV's numismatic collection and collection of miniature paintings; it served as a dining room; and, it served as a workroom. Of all the rooms of the petit appartement du roi during the reign of Louis XV, this was perhaps one of the most richly decorated and opulently appointed (Verlet 1985, p. 452).

The cabinet des livres, salon ovale of Louis XIV, the peite galerie with its two salons, and the cabinet des médailles were retained (1740 plan #6, 7, 8, & 9).

By 1740, the petit appartement du roi had expanded to such an extent into the cour du roi that the eastern part of this courtyard became a separate courtyard. This new courtyard was called the cour intérieur du roi (1740 plan II) and the cour du roi was renamed cour des cerfs. This new name was due to the two dozen sculpted deer heads that Louis XV ordered placed on the walls of the courtyard (Verlet 1985, p. 457).

== Louis XV – 1760 ==
The modifications of the late 1750s of the petit appartement du roi were in response to a general reorganization of the apartments in the corps de logis of the château and the destruction of the escalier des ambassadeurs (1740 plan #10). To accommodate a new apartment for his daughter, Madame Adélaïde, Louis XV ordered the construction of rooms on the same floor as the petit appartement du roi. This new apartment occupied space that had been the petite galerie and the two salons as well as new space created by the suppression of the escalier des ambassadeurs (1760 plan #9).

The most significant modifications to the petit apartment du roi at this time were the relocation of the degré du roi (1760 plan #4), the construction of the salle à manger des retours de chasses (1750) (1760 plan #5), and the pièce des buffets (1754) (1760 plan #6) (Verlet 1985, p. 473-474). The salle à manger des retours de chasses was built upon the site of Louis XV's bath (1740 plan g) when the King wanted a dining room on the first floor in which he could entertain a small group of friends, most frequently after hunting (Bluche, 2000; Marie, 1984). The decoration of the salle à manger des retours de chasses incorporated paneling and decorative elements from the salon du billard of Louis XIV (Verlet 1985, p. 442-443).

This era during which Louis XV decorated the petit appartement du roi was significant in the evolution of French decorative styles of the 18th century. Many of these rooms represent some of the finest examples of the Louis XV style. Of the rooms of the appartement du roi, the salon des pendules is one of the most significant. With paneling by Jacques Verberckt, the room was furnished with chairs and table and served for gaming parties hosted by Louis XV (Verlet 1985, p. 449). However, it would the delivery of 1754 that would set this room apart from others.

In January of that year, Louis XV had brought from the Château de Choisy and placed in this room the famed Passemant Astronomical clock. The clock, which was designed by the engineer, Claude-Simon Passemant, clockmaker Louis Dauthiau, and set in an ormolu case by Philippe Caffieri, was a marvel of its day. Taking 12 years to complete, the clock is surmounted by a crystal sphere in which a mechanical armillary sphere – after the Copernican model – operated. The time, days of the week, months of the year (even calculating for bissextile years), and year were accurately displayed. On account of this clock, the room received the definitive name, salon de la pendule (1760 plan #2) (Kuraszewski, 1976; Verlet 1985, p. 450).

By 1760, the cabinet intérieur (1760 plan #7) had become to be also known as the bureau du roi and this room came best to represent not only the personal taste of Louis XV, but it also stands as one of the finest examples of the Louis XV style. In 1755, the cabinetmaker Gilles Joubert delivered two corner cabinets, complementing those by Antoine-Robert Gaudreau, which had been delivered in 1739, to house numismatic record of Louis XV's reign (Verlet 1985, p. 452). In 1769, the mechanical roll-top desk by Jean-François Oeben was delivered (Verlet 1985, p. 454).

With the evolution of the cabinet intérieur, Louis XV also pursued the construction of his arrière cabinet (1760 plan #8). In suppressing the cabinet des livres and the salon ovale of Louis XIV, Louis XV created a private room (with a small cabinet de la chaise) that communicated directly with the degré du roi in which he conducted much of the day-to-day governance of France. The utilitarian décor – a simple table, chairs and rows of shelving – reflects this usage (Verlet 1985, p. 459).

== Louis XVI ==
With the exception of reclaiming part of the apartment of Madame Adélaïde, Louis XVI chose to retain the décor of the petit appartement du roi as his grandfather had left it. The arrière cabinet of Louis XV was rechristened cabinet des dépêches (1789 plan #8); however, Louis XVI continued to use the room as day-to-day workroom as his grandfather had (Rogister, 1993).

The pièce de la vaisselle d'or (1789 plan #9) – originally the premier salon de la petite galerie – formed part of the appartement de Madame Adélaïde. Under Louis XVI, the pièce de la vaisselle d’or was where the King kept his collection of rare porcelains and curiosities, many received as diplomatic gifts (Verlet 1985, p. 526)

The small room north and behind the pièce de la vaisselle d'or is the cabinet de la cassette du roi (1789 plan #10). This room was converted into a bathroom for Louis XV around 1769. Louis XVI used the room – allegedly – as a place where he could maintain his personal financial accounts (Verlet 1985, p. 526). The paneling dates from the remodeling for Louis XV; however, Louis XVI ordered a total regilding of the room in 1784 (Verlet 1985, p. 526). When Pierre de Nolhac assumed the directorship of the museum of Versailles, he discovered that this room was being used as a broom closet by the janitorial staff. This discovery was the impetus that compelled Nolhac to begin exhaustive research on the subject of the history of Versailles (Nolhac, 1937).

The bibliothèque de Louis XVI (1789 plan #11) located directly east of the pièce de la vaisselle d'or occupies the space that was the chambre de Madame Adélaïde (which Louis XV rechristened salon d’assemblée in 1769) and previously the petite galerie. In 1774, construction on the library began with the decoration being executed by the workshop of the Rousseau brothers, who had previously worked on the paneling of the cabinet de la cassette du roi and on part of the sculptural decorations of the Opéra (Verlet 1985, p. 513). This room represents not only the personal taste of Louis XVI it also stands as one of the finest examples of the Louis XVI style.

The room located just to the east of the bibliothèque de Louis XVI is the salle à manger aux salles neuves (1789 plan #12). This room, once the deuxième salon de la petite galerie and once one of the rooms of Madame Adélaïde, was remodeled into a dining room for Louis XV in 1769. The paneling by Jacques Verberckt dates from the 1769 redecoration of Louis XV and the present blue upholstery, draperies, and hunting scenes by Jean-Baptiste Oudry date from 1774 when Louis XVI redecorated the room (Baulez, 1976; Verlet 1985, p. 527). The room was also known as the salle des porcelains on account of the annual display of the production of the Sèvres factory that was arranged in this room during Christmas (Baulez, 1976).

The pièce des buffets or salle du billiard (1789 plan #13) occupies area that had once been the landing of the escalier des ambassadeurs. During dinners, the billiard table would be covered with a wooden plank on which a buffet would be dressed for the King's guests (Verlet 1985, p. 527). The room originally had a window opening onto the cave du roi (1789 plan III), the courtyard that was created when the escalier des ambassadeurs was destroyed in 1752.

Occupying the site of the cabinet des médailles of Louis XIV is the cabinet des jeux (1789 plan #14) of Louis XVI. Upon the return of Louis XV and the court to Versailles, there had been a systematic rearrangement of the collections of Louis XIV that had been housed in the petite appartement du roi, particularly the items kept in the Louis XIV's cabinet des médailles. The collection was either reorganized in other rooms of the petit appartement du roi or sent to the bibliothèque du roi in Paris. With the destruction of the escalier des ambassadeurs in 1752 and the subsequent construction of the apartment for Madame Adélaïde, the cabinet des médailles of Louis XIV was completely transformed into an antichambre for Madame Adélaïde. Dating from 1775, the room was redecorated in 1785 during the construction of a theater next to the salon d’Hercule, Louis XVI decided to remodel this room as a game room (Verlet 1985, p. 528). The salle à manger aux salles neuves, salle du billiard and the cabinet des jeux were used for the intimate dinner parties given by Louis XVI and Marie Antoinette for their friends and selected members of the royal family.

== Gallery ==
Views of rooms in the petit appartement du roi
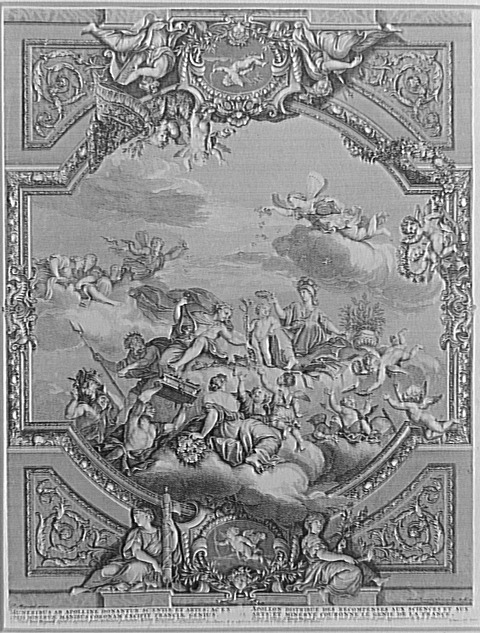
Petite galerie – view of the central ceiling vault, engraving by Simon Thomassin (1655-1733) after Pierre Mignard (1612-1695), late 17th century

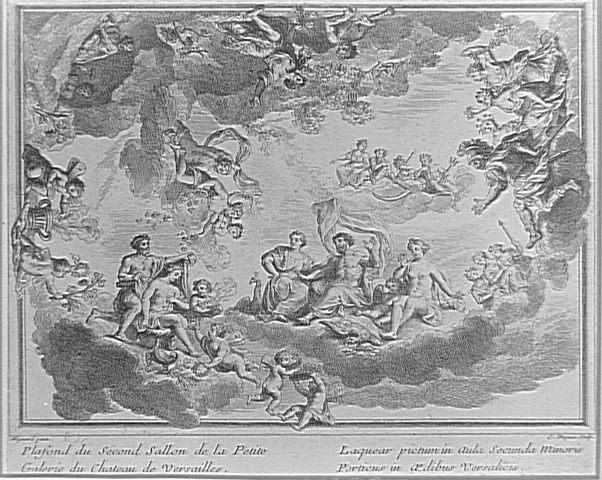
Deuxième salon de la Petite galerie – view of the ceiling vault, engraving after Pierre Mignard (1612-1695), late 17th century

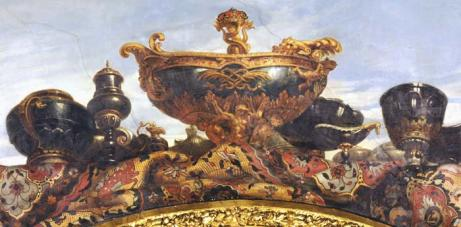
Salon de l'abondance detail of the ceiling depicting Louis XIV's nef that was housed in the cabinet des médailles, René-Antoine Houasse (1645-1710), 1683

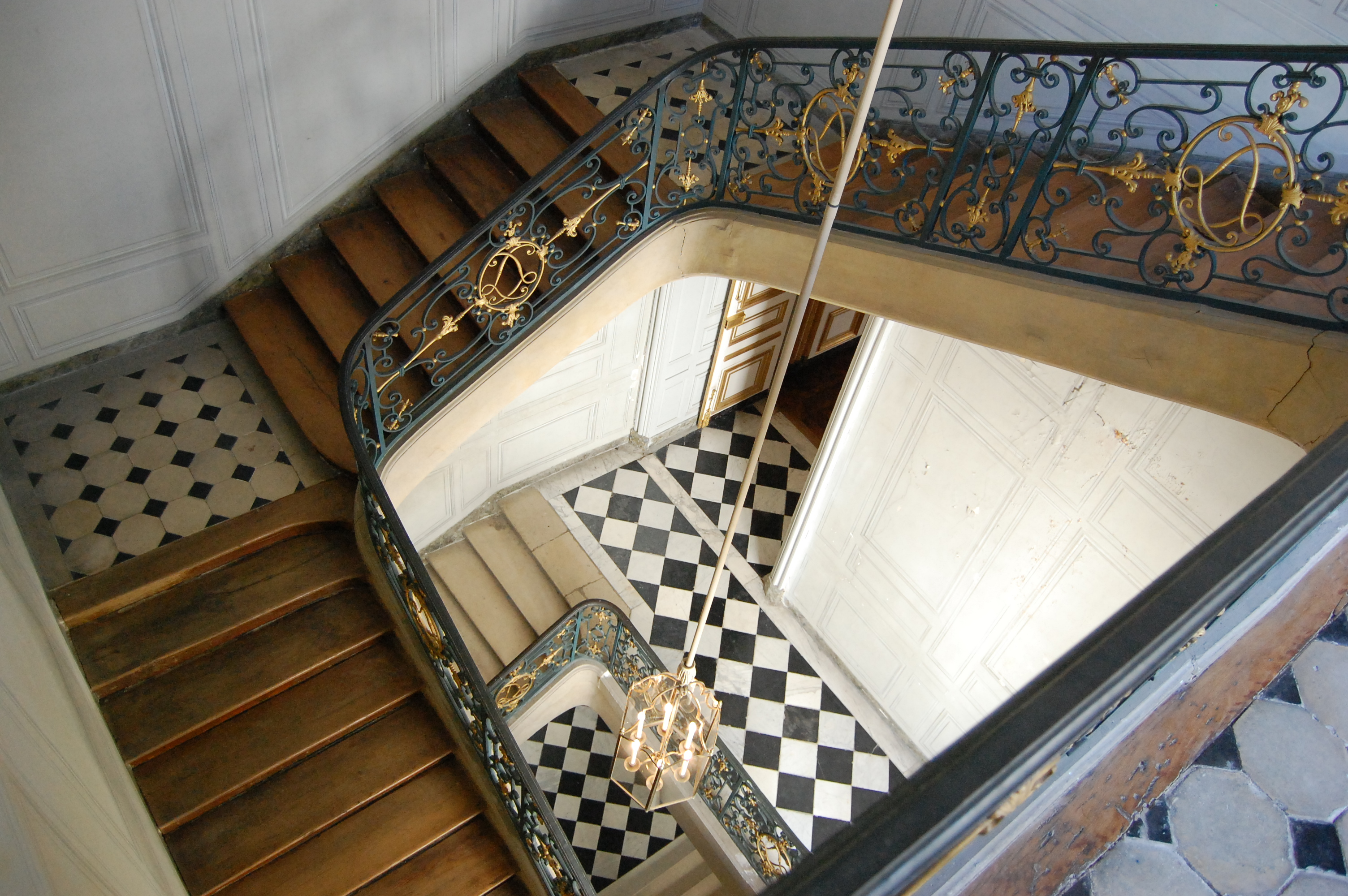
Degré du roi the king's private staircase

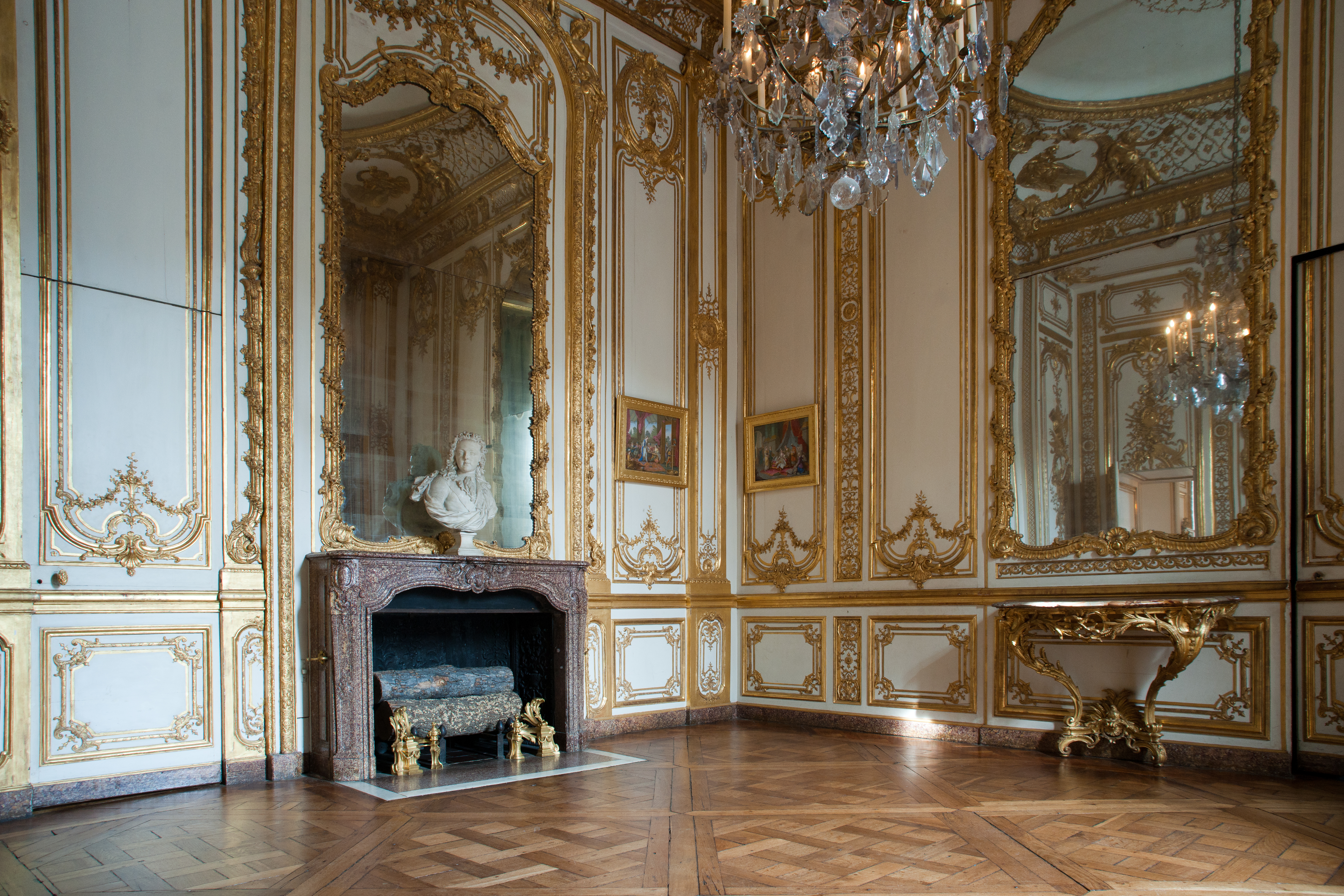
Pièce de la vaisselle d'or

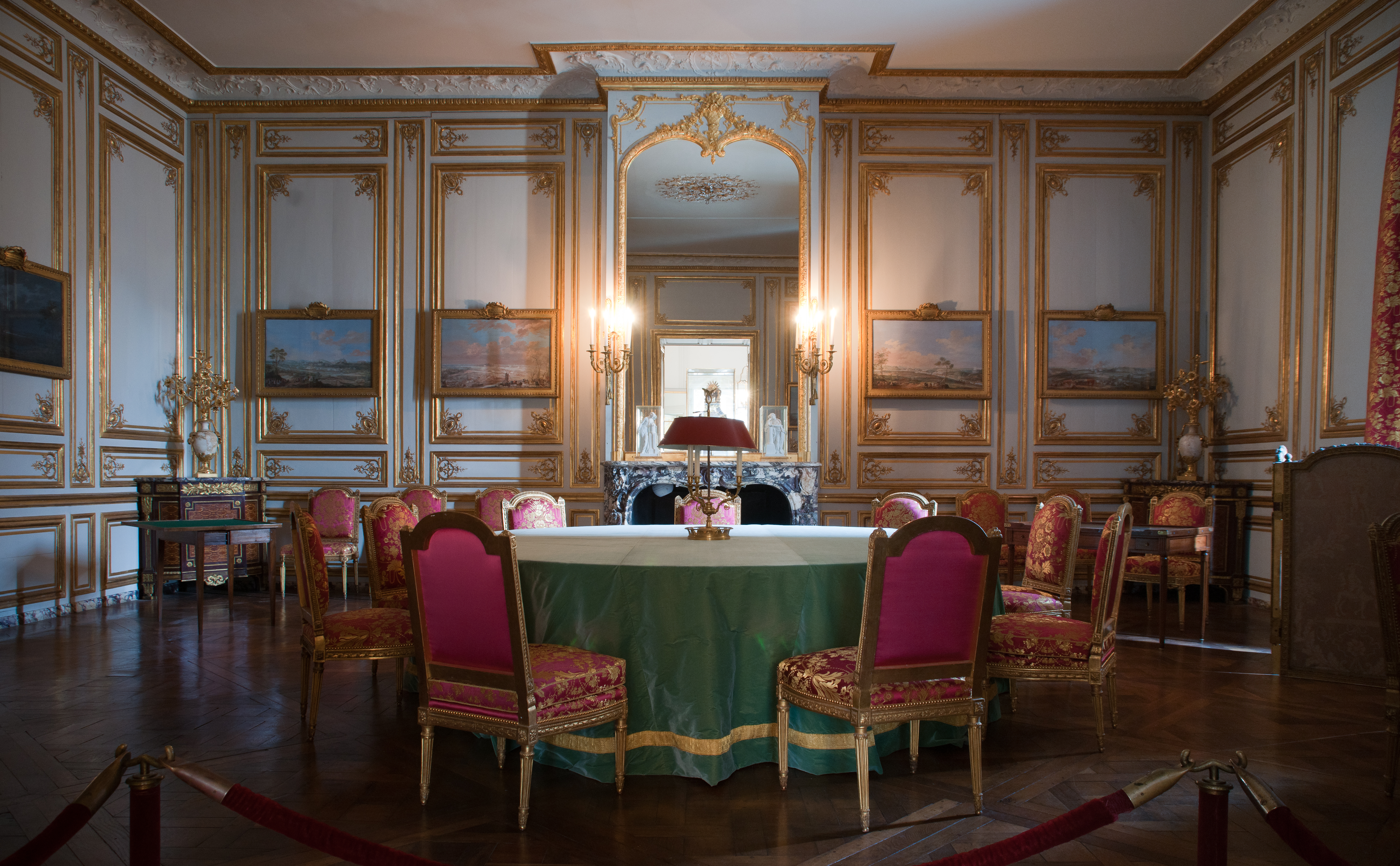
Cabinet des jeux of Louis XVI

== Sources ==
Books

* Blondel, Jacques-François (1752–1756). Architecture françoise, ou Recueil des plans, élévations, coupes et profils des églises, maisons royales, palais, hôtels & édifices les plus considérables de Paris. Vol. 4. Paris: Charles-Antoine Jombert.

* Bluche, François (1986). Louis XIV. Paris: Arthème Fayard.

* Bluche, François (1991). Dictionnaire du Grand Siècle. Paris: Arthème Fayard.

* Bluche, François (2000). Louis XV. Paris: Perrin.

* Cochet, Jean-Benoît-Désiré (1859). Le Tombeau de Childéric Ier, roi des Francs, restitué à l'aide de l'archéologie et des découvertes récentes faites en France, en Belgique, en Suisse, en Allemagne et en Angleterre. Paris: Derache.

* Combes, sieur de (1681). Explication historique de ce qu'il y a de plus remarquable dans la maison royale de Versailles. Paris: C. Nego.

* Cosnac, Gabriel-Jules, comte de (1984). Mémoires du marquis de Sourches sur le règne de Louis XIV. Vol. 3. Paris: Librairie Hachette et Cie.

* Croÿ-Solre, Emmanuel de (1906–1921). Journal inédit du duc de Croÿ. Vol. eds. Emmanuel-Henri de Grouchy and Paul Cottin. 4 volumes. Paris : E. Flammarion.

* Dangeau, marquis de (1854). Journal avec les additions inedites du duc de Saint-Simon. Vol. 1. Paris: Firmin Didot Frères.

* Félibien, Jean-François (1703). Description sommaire de Versailles ancienne et nouvelle. Paris: A. Chrétien.

* France d'Hézecques, Félix comte de (1873). Souvenirs d'un page de la cour de Louis XVI. Paris: Didier.

* Kimball, Fiske (1943). The Creation of the Rococo. Philadelphia: Philadelphia Museum of Art.

* Lighthart, Edward (1997). Archétype et symbole dans le style Louis XIV versaillais: réflexions sur l'imago rex et l'imago patriae au début de l'époque moderne. Doctoral thesis.

* Luynes, Charles-Philippe d'Albert, duc de (1860–1865). Mémoires sur la cour de Louis XV (1735-1758). Vol. 17 volumes. Paris : Firmin-Didot frères.

* Marie, Alfred and Jeanne (1972). Mansart à Versailles. Paris: Editions Jacques Freal.

* Marie, Alfred and Jeanne (1984). Versailles au temps de Louis XV. Paris: Imprimerie Nationale.

* Mauricheau-Beaupré, Charles (1949). Versailles. Paris: Draeger et Veive.

* Monicart, Jean-Baptiste de (1720). Versailles immortalisé. Paris: E. Ganeau.

* Nolhac, Pierre de (1926). Versailles au XVIIIe siècle. Paris: Louis Conard.

* Nolhac, Pierre de (1929). Versailles. Paris: A. Morancé.

* Nolhac, Pierre de (1930). Versailles et la cour de France: L'Art à Versailles. Paris: Louis Conard.

* Nolhac, Pierre de (1937). La Résurrection de Versailles, souvenirs d'un conservateur, 1887-1920. Paris: Plon.

* Petitfils, Jean-Christian (1995). Louis XIV. Paris : Perrin.

* Petitfils, Jean-Christian (2005). Louis XVI. Paris: Perrin.

* Piganiol de la Force, Jean-Aymar (1701). Nouvelle description des châteaux et parcs de Versailles et Marly. Paris: Florentin de la lune.

* Verlet, Pierre (1985). Le château de Versailles. Paris: Librairie Arthème Fayard.

Journals

* Batiffol, Louis (April 1909). "Origine du château de Versailles". La Revue de Paris: 841–869.

* Baulez, Christian (1976). "La restauration des 'salles à manger aux salles neuves'". Revue du Louvre. #3: 189–196.

* Brejon de Lavergnée, Arnauld (1985). "Le cabinet des tableaux du Roi 1661-1685/1686". Colloque de Versailles.

* Hulftegger, Aeline (1954). "Notes sur la formation des collections de Louis XIV". Bulletin de la Société d'Histoire de l'Art français: 124–134.

* Josephson, Ragnar (1926). "Relation de la visite de Nicodème Tessin à Marly, Versailles, Rueil, et St-Cloud en 1687". Revue de l'Histoire de Versailles: 150–67, 274–300.

* Kimball, Fiske (1946). "Unknown Versailles: The appartement du Roi, 1678-1701". Gazette des Beaux-Arts. 6 pér., vol. 29: 85–112.

* Kuraszewski, Guy (1976). "Pendules et barometres royaux". Revue du Louvre. #3: 213–219.

* Le Guillou, Jean-Claude (April 1985). "La création des cabinets et des petits appartements de Louis XV au château de Versailles 1722-1738". Gazette des Beaux-Arts. 6 pér., vol. 105: 137–146.

* Le Guillou, Jean-Claude (July–August 1986). "Le Grand et le Petit Appartement de Louis XIV au château de Versailles". Gazette des Beaux-Arts. 6 pér., vol. 108: 7–22.

* Le Guillou, Jean-Claude (February 1976). "Remarques sur le corps central du château de Versailles à partir du château de Louis XIII". Gazette des Beaux-Arts. 6 pér., vol. 87: 49–60.

* Meyer, Daniel (1976). "L'appartement interieur du Roi". Revue du Louvre. #3: 175–183.

* Meyer, Daniel (February 1989). "L'ameublement de la chambre de Louis XIV à Versailles de 1701 à nos jours". Gazette des Beaux-Arts. 6 pér., vol. 113: 79–104.

* Rogister, John M. J (May 1993). "From Louis XV to Louis XVI: Some Thoughts on the Petits Appartements". Eighteenth Century Life. 17, n.s., 2: 146–166.

* Saule, Béatrix (December 2005). "Insignes du pouvoir et usages de cour à Versailles sous Louis XIV". Bulletin du Centre de recherche du château de Versailles (2). doi:10.4000/crcv.132.

* Saule, Béatrix (October 1992). "Le premier goût du Roi à Versailles: décoration et ameublement". Gazette des Beaux-Arts. 120: 137–148.
