= Appartement du roi =

Rooms in the Palace of Versailles, France

King's Apartment (appartement du roi)
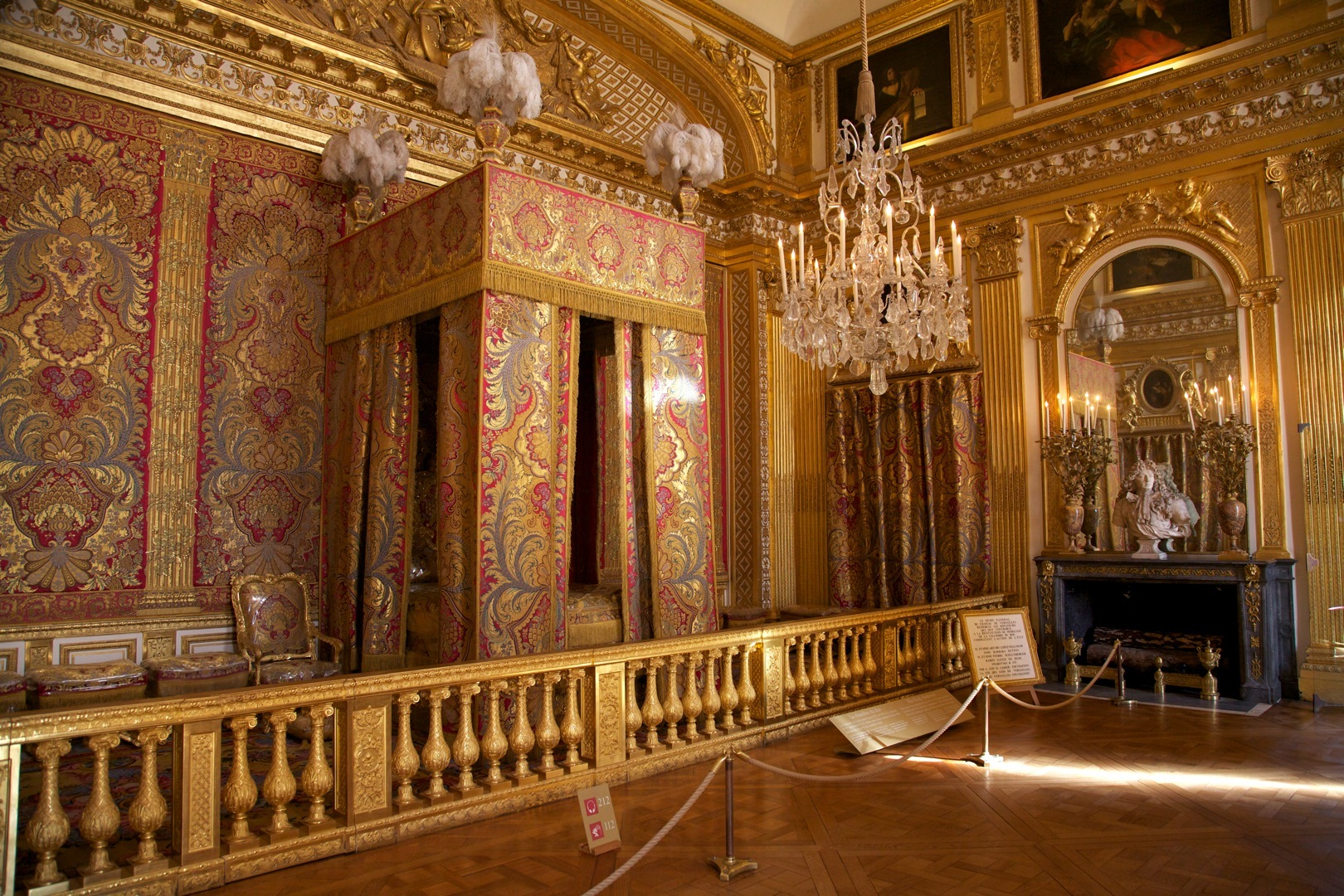
- King's Bedchamber (room 5) in the King's Apartment
- Building: Palace of Versailles
- Country: France
- Coordinates: 48.8048°N 2.12046°E
- Designer: Louis Le Vau; Jules Hardouin-Mansart; Charles Le Brun; Robert de Cotte

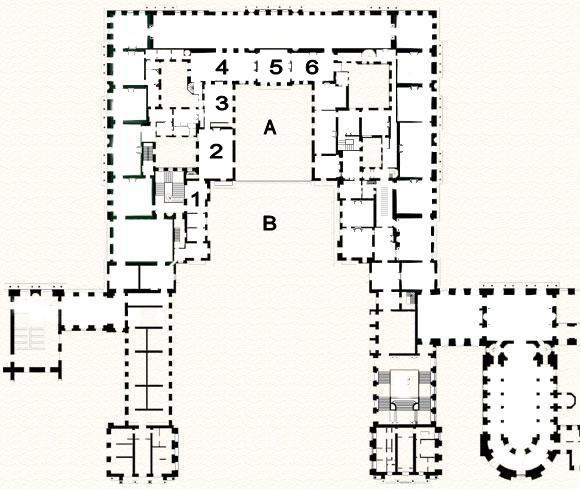
Plan of the appartement du roi Key to the rooms of the appartement du roi: 1 / Vestibule or loggia; 2 / Salle des gardes; 3 / Première antichambre (salon du grand couvert); 4 / Salon de l'œil de bœuf (formerly deuxième antichambre / antichambre des Bassans and chambre du roi); 5 / Chambre de Louis XIV (formerly salon du roi); 6 / Salon du conseil (formerly cabinet des glaces and cabinet des termes); A / Cour de marbre; B / Cour royale

The appartement du roi or King's Apartment is the suite of rooms in the Palace of Versailles that served as the living quarters of Louis XIV. Overlooking the Marble Court (cour de marbre), these rooms are situated in the oldest part of the chateau in rooms originally designated for use by the queen in Louis XIII's chateau. Owing largely to the discomfort of the grand appartement du roi and to the construction of the Hall of Mirrors, Louis XIV began to remodel these rooms for his use shortly after the death of Maria Theresa in 1684. The appartement du roi evolved to become the everyday working quarters for Louis XV and Louis XVI.

Initially, the appartement du roi consisted of a suite of eight rooms that issued from the Queen's Staircase (escalier de la reine). The number was reduced to seven after 1701 and to six in 1755.

== Vestibule ==
The vestibule is paneled in marble and lighted by two windows that opened onto the cour royale. In 1701, in order to provide more light to the staircase, the south wall opposite the windows was opened, thus creating a loggia from the vestibule. During the latter part of Louis XIV's reign, the Queen's staircase and the vestibule served as entrance to the appartement du roi, the grand appartement de la reine, and the apartment of Madame de Maintenon.

== Salle des gardes du roi ==
The salle des gardes du roi, served to house the Garde du corps du roi – the King's Body Guard. The early decor of this room included walls clad in tooled gilt leather and a battle scene by Joseph Parrocel, "The Battle of Leuze, 18 September 1691", hung over the fireplace. Two large chandeliers emblazoned with the King's monogram complemented the decor. The utilitarian nature of the room was evidenced by the wooden benches, camp beds, and folding screens used by the guards stationed in the room. On Mondays, a table, dressed with a gold-fringed velvet rug, would be placed in this room, at which Louis XIV would personally accept petitions presented to him by his subjects.

== Première antichambre ==
The première antichambre or salon du grand couvert (also known during the reign of Louis XIV as la salle ou le roy soupe), opened with three windows onto the cour de marbre (north) and with three windows onto the cour de la reine (south). The decoration of the room consisted of battle scenes by Joseph Parrocel with the "Battle of Arbela" being displayed over the mantelpiece. After the death of the queen and the Dauphine, the room served for those occasions during which Louis XIV dined alone in public. For the grand couvert, a table with a single armchair was dressed before the fireplace. The wall opposite the fireplace originally contained a tribune for musicians, but this was suppressed in the 18th century.

The end of one of the more scandalous events in Versailles history during the Sun King's reign transpired in this room. In 1691, the fringe from the portieres in the Salon de Mars and part of the embroidered bed cover from the bed in the Salon de Mercure were stolen. Toward the service of dessert, a bundle was thrown through one of the windows facing the cour de marbre and landed on the king's table. Louis XIV's only comment, "I think that those are my fringes."

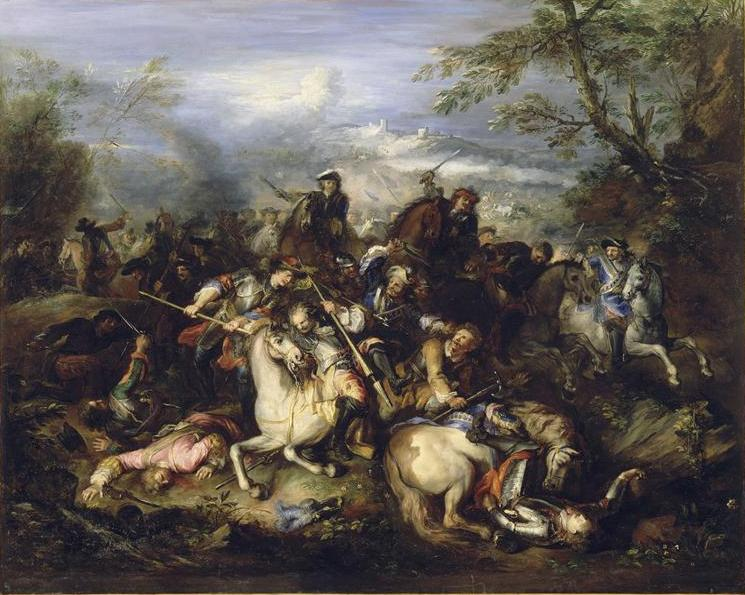
| "Salle des gardes du roi" Charles Le Brun | "The Battle of Leuze, in which the Gardes du corps du roi fought, 18 September 1691" ca. 1691 by Joseph Parrocel | "Salon du grand couvert" Charles Le Brun |

Paintings from the salon du grand couvert
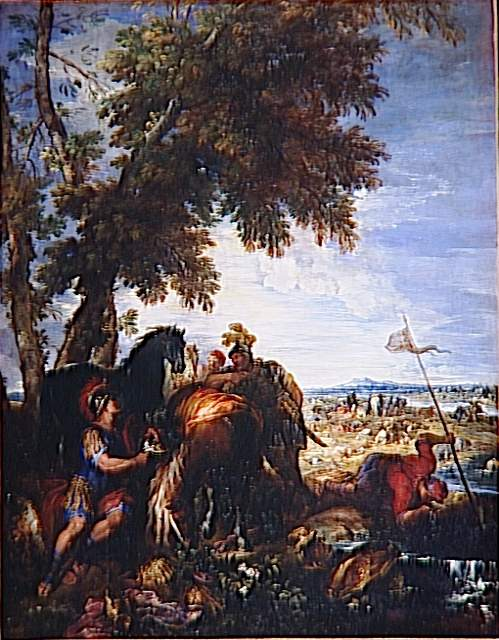
"Cavalrymen quenching their thirst after a battle" ca. 1687 by Joseph Parrocel, (1646–1704) South wall

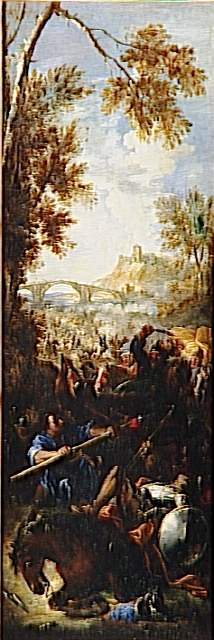
"Cavalry combat" by Joseph Parrocel south wall, west

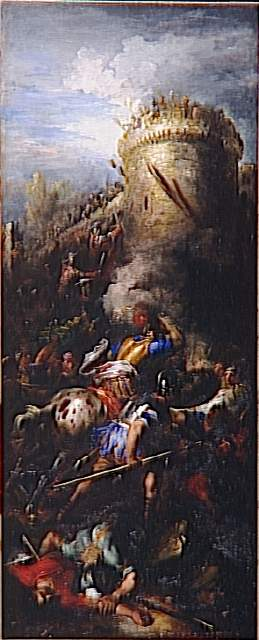
"Cavalry charge toward the ramparts of a city" ca. 1687 by Joseph Parrocel south wall, east

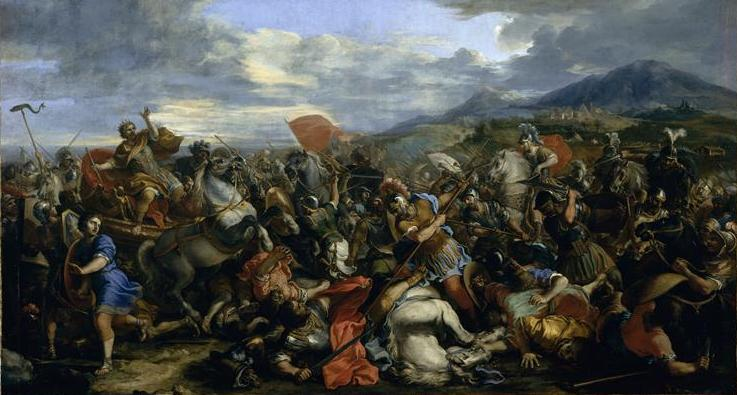
"Alexander the Great defeats Darius at the battle of Arabel" ca. 1687 by Jacques Courtois, above the fireplace

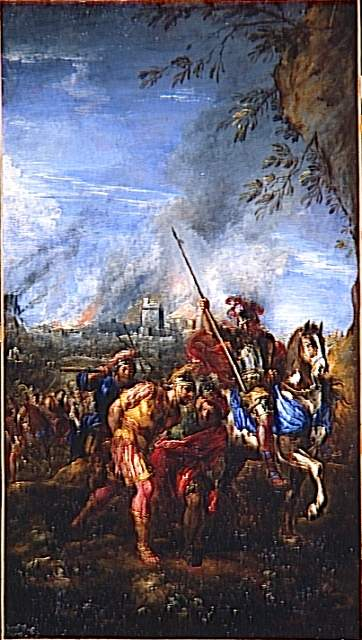
"Cavalryman leading prisoners after the taking of a city" ca. 1687 by Joseph Parrocel, north wall

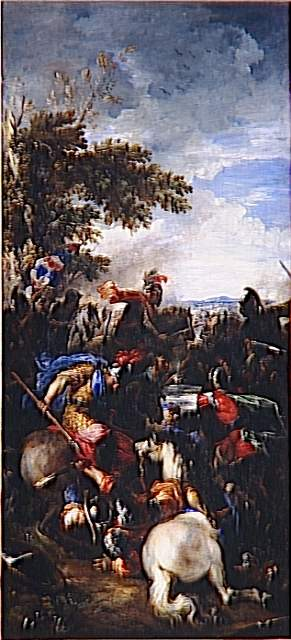
"Cavalry charge with a fallen rider" ca. 1687 by Joseph Parrocel, north wall

== Salon de l'œil de bœuf ==
The salon de l'œil de bœuf or Antechamber of the Œil-de-Bœuf was formed in 1701 by combining two adjacent rooms, the deuxième antichambre and chambre du roi. The salon de l'œil de bœuf became the main antechamber to the King's Bedroom, which was also created that year (see next section).

Taking its name from the œil de bœuf (oval) window located in the south cove of the ceiling, the salon de l'œil de bœuf features a gilt-stucco running frieze that decorated the cove of the room's ceiling and features a trellis-work background on which are groups of dancing putti. It is the decoration of the cove that heralds a transition from the formalistic style that was used in the decoration of the grand appartement du roi and the Hall of Mirrors to a more relaxed style that anticipated the Louis XV style. Louis XIV spared no expense in decorating this room. Mirrors, "The Fainting of Ester" and "Judith with the head of Holofernes" by Veronese hung as pendants, and gilt furniture all contributed to making this one of the most sumptuous rooms in the appartement du roi.

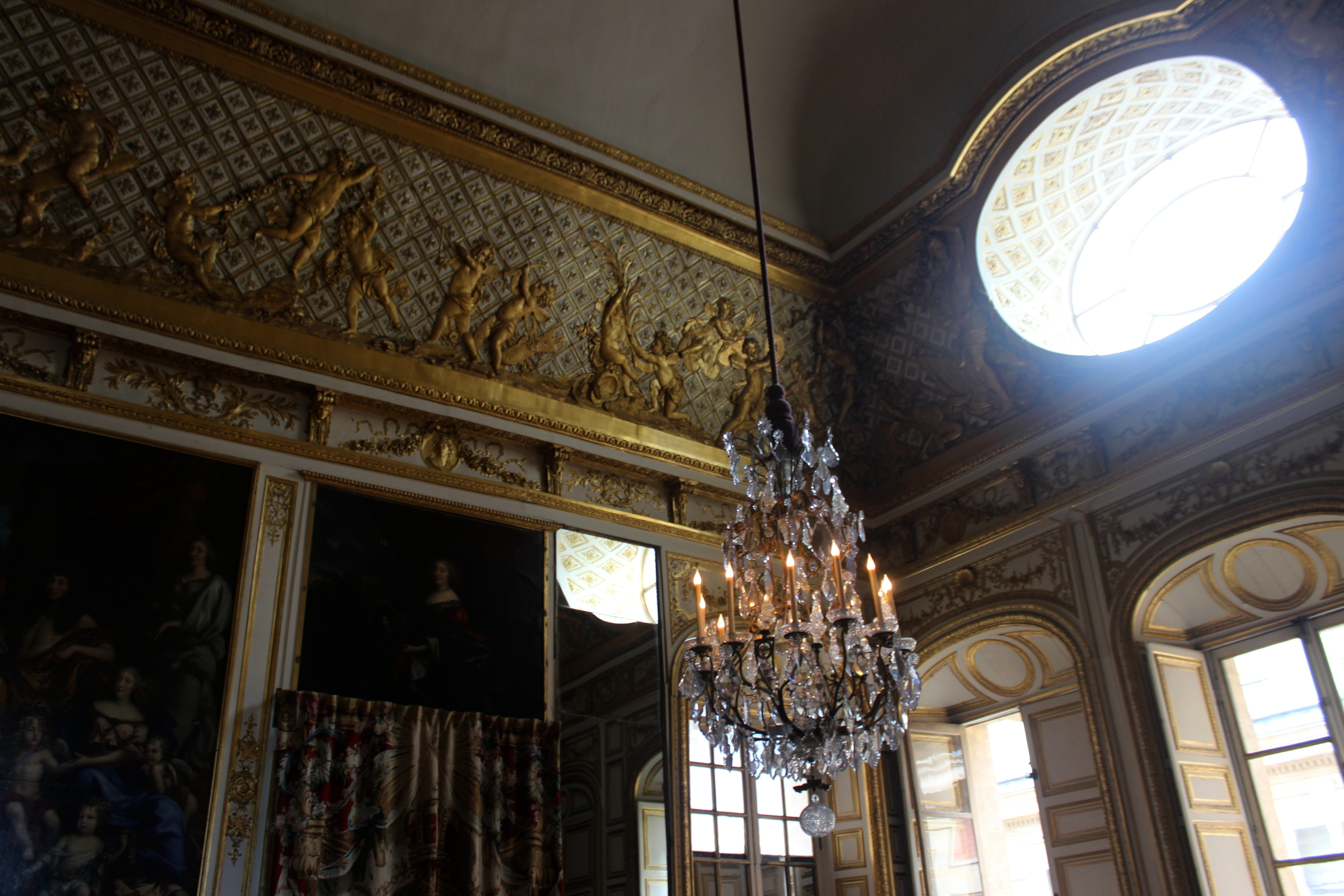
View of the southeast ceiling corner of the salon de l'œil de bœuf with windows facing the Cour de la Reine

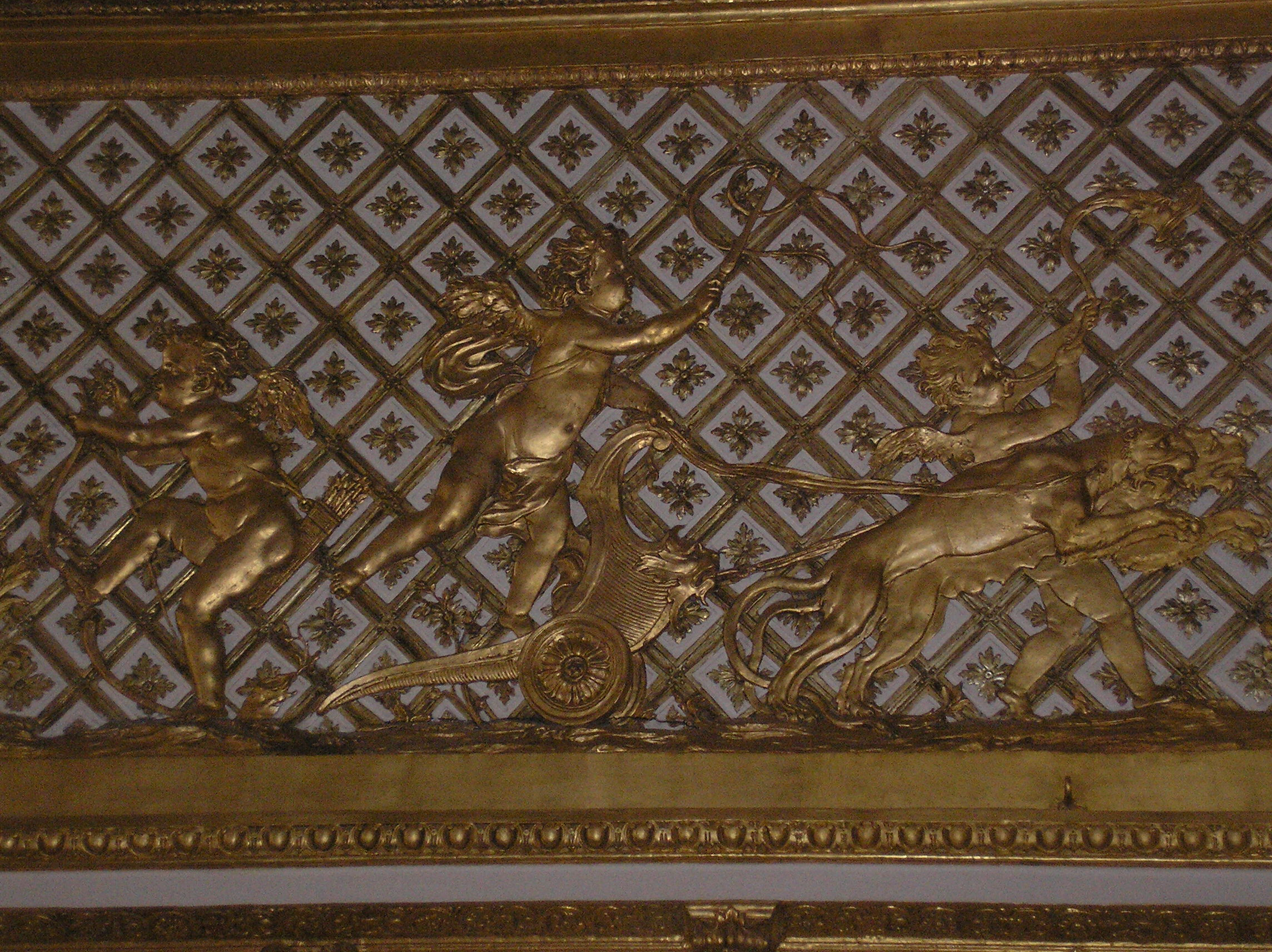
Detail of the cornice frieze

The former two rooms, the deuxième antichambre and the chambre du roi, were earlier part of the apartment of the queen, but in 1684, after the death of Maria Theresa of Spain, Louis XIV attached these rooms to his apartment. The deuxième antichambre served as waiting room for courtiers waiting to attend the king's lever in the chambre du roi and was also known as the antichambre des Bassans on account of the number of paintings by the northern Italian artist, Jacopo Bassano, that were displayed on the walls. Over the mantelpiece, the famed "Noli me tangeres" by Lambert Sustris was displayed.

Paintings from the Antichambre des Bassans and the Salon de l'œil de bœuf
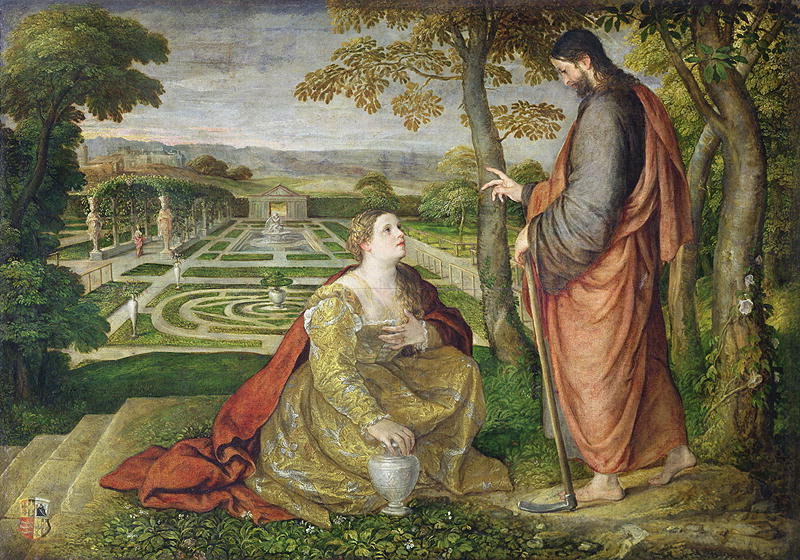
Noli me tangere (2nd half of the 16th century) by Lambert Sustris

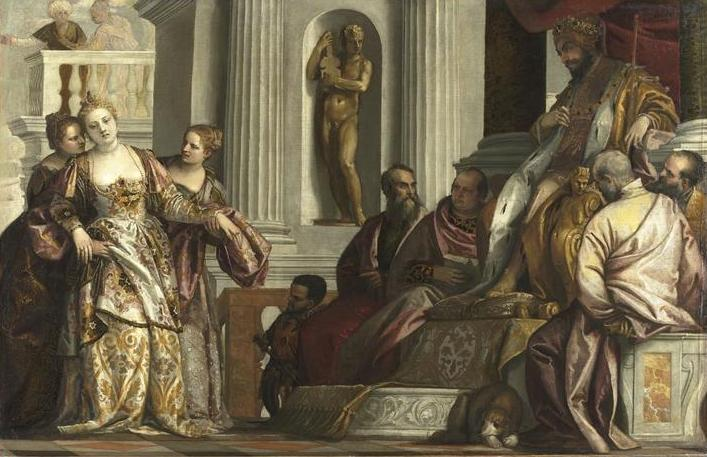
The Fainting of Esther (late 16th century) by Veronese

== Chambre de Louis XIV ==
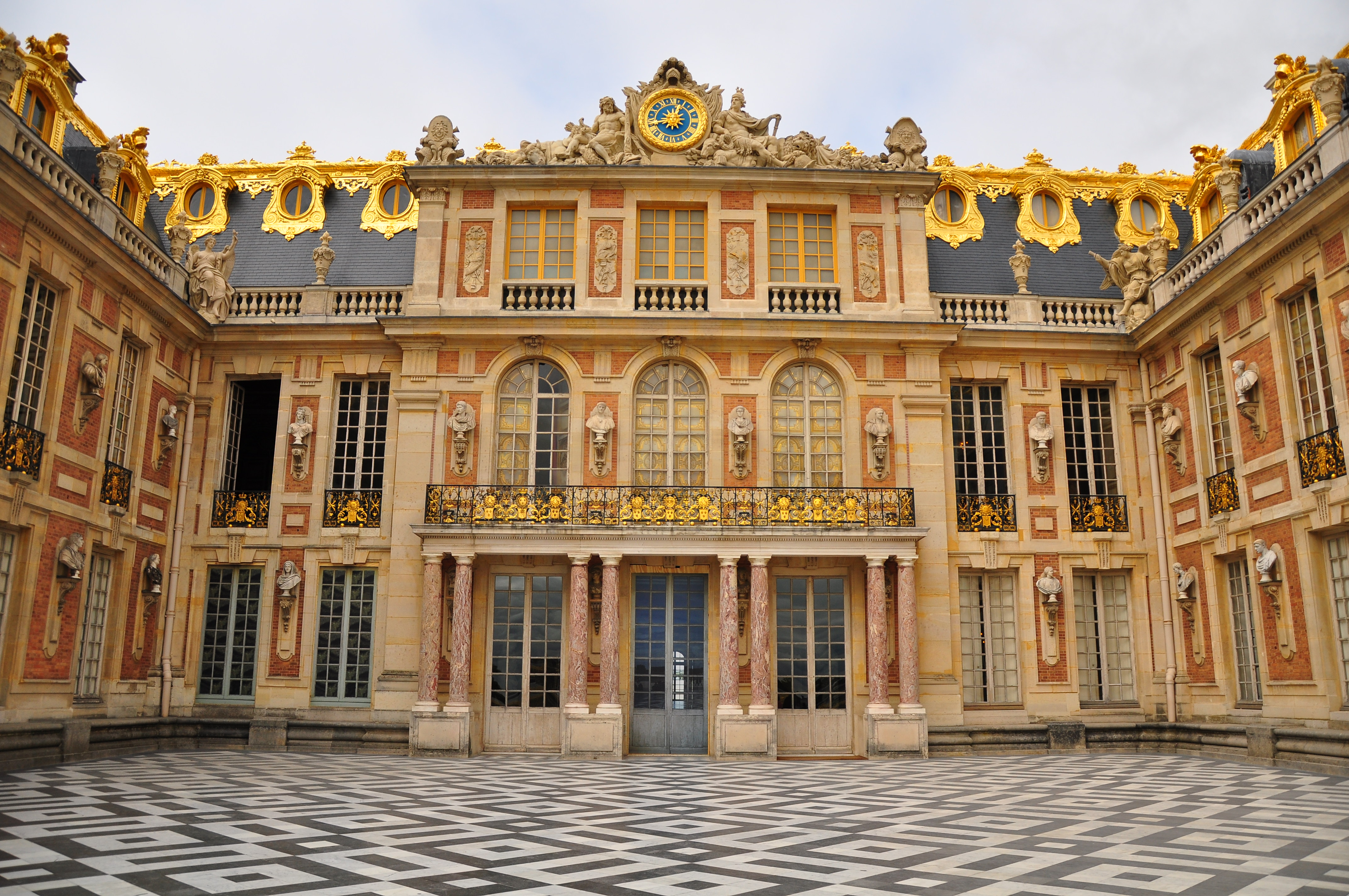
Marble Court facade with the King's Bedchamber opening onto the balcony supported by eight red marble columns

The chambre de Louis XIV (or King's Bedchamber) was constructed in 1701 on the site of the former salon du roi (or State Drawing Room), which dated from the time of Louis XIII. This room underwent a number of modifications during the reign of Louis XIV, most notably in 1678 when the three western windows facing the terrace became archways opening into the Hall of Mirrors (constructed beginning that year), for which the room became a kind of appendage. A 3-storey avant-corps was added to the exterior of the eastern façade facing the Marble Court, with three bays opening onto a gilt wrought-iron balcony overlooking the courtyard, and the top part of the room corresponding to the attic storey of the avant-corps.

When in 1684 Louis XIV moved into the adjacent room to the south (the chambre du roi), this central room behind the facade of the avant-corps was designated as the salon du roi or the salon où le roi s'habille ("the room in which the king dresses"). For 17 years, it served as venue for the ceremonies that surrounded the life of the King, such as the lever and the coucher. When the chambre de Louis XIV was established in 1701, the archways to the Hall of Mirrors were sealed off, and the room became the ideological as well as physical focal point of the palace. The King died in this room on 1 September 1715. Later, Louis XV and Louis XVI would continue to use it for the lever and the coucher. On 6 October 1789, Louis XVI, Marie Antoinette, and the Dauphin appeared on the balcony before the mob that forced the royal family to move from Versailles to the Tuileries Palace in Paris.

Paintings in the Chambre de Louis XIV
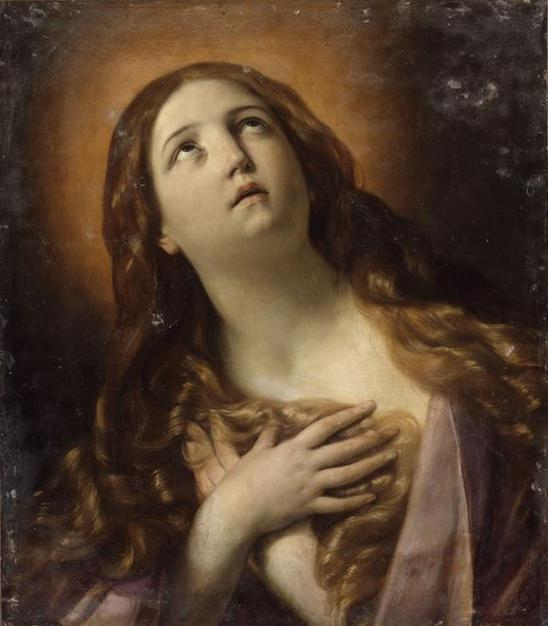
Mary Magdalene (ca. 1628–1629) by Guido Reni

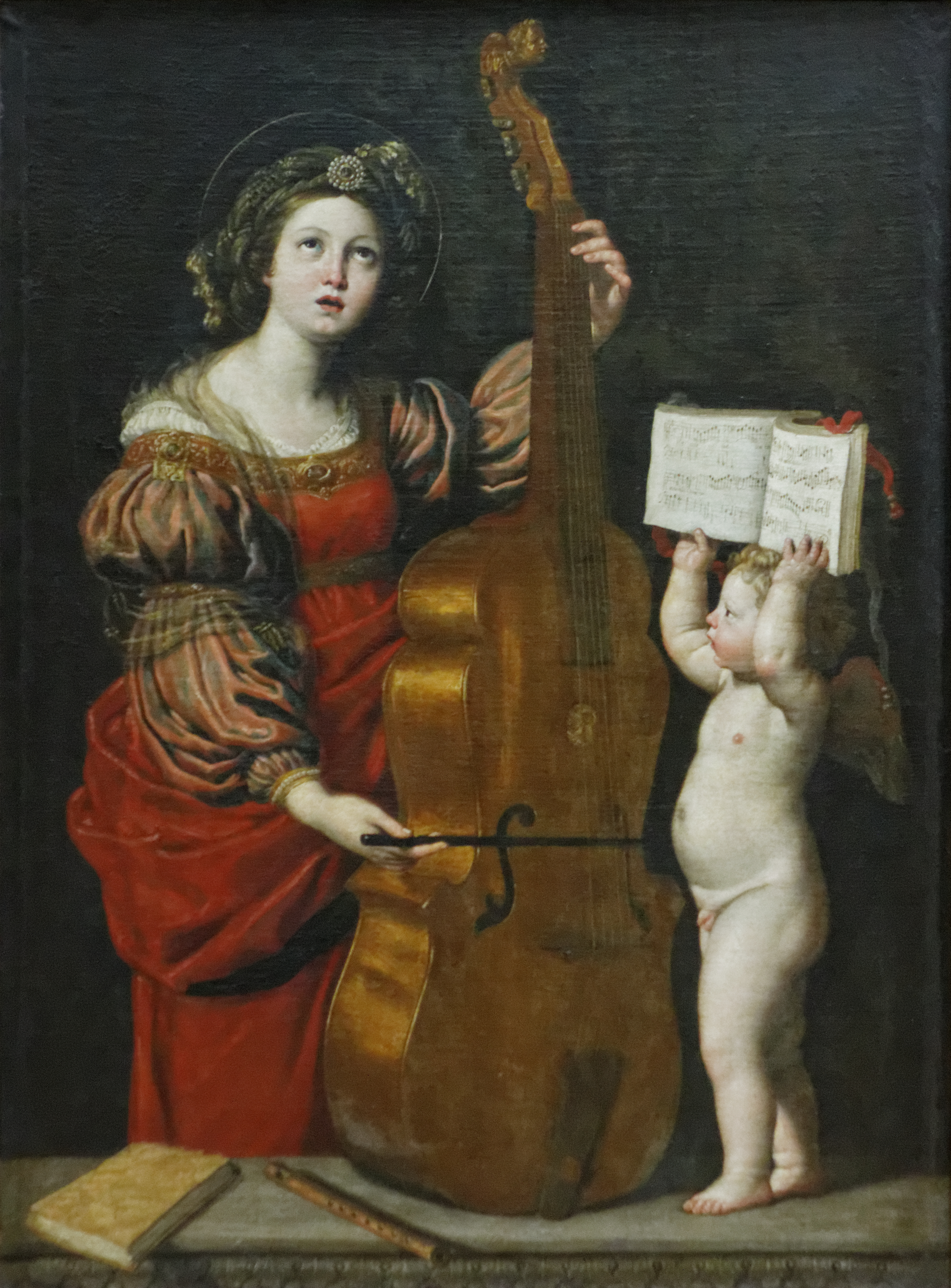
Saint Cecilia (ca. 1st quarter of the 17th century) by Domenichino

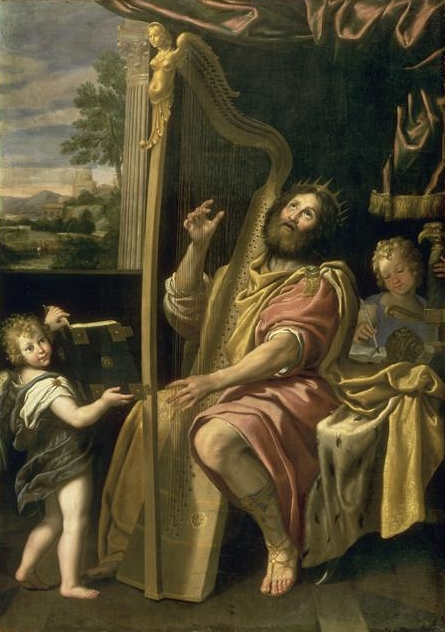
King David playing the harp (ca. 1st quarter of the 17th century) by Domenichino

As a measure of economy, Louis XIV retained much of the decor of the salon du roi in the decoration of the chambre de Louis XIV. The over-door paintings included The Portrait of Francisco de Moncada and a Self-portrait by Anthony van Dyck, Saint John the Baptist by Caravaggio, and Mary Magdalene by Guido Reni. Domenichino's Saint Cecilia was placed in the cornice setting of the south wall above the fireplace and the artist's King David playing the harp hung as pendant opposite on the north wall.

The western wall of the room became the wall of the alcove – the area of the room separated by a balustrade in which the bed was located. The decoration of the alcove, with the ornaments of the agrafe and volutes as well as the trelliswork sculpture, anticipate in many respects anticipates the Régence style that was in vogue between 1715 and 1723. Crowning the bed is Nicolas Coustou's relief sculpture, France Triumphant, which is complemented by two relief sculptures of Fame by François Lespingola located in the pendentives of the arch.

The Chambre de Louis XIV
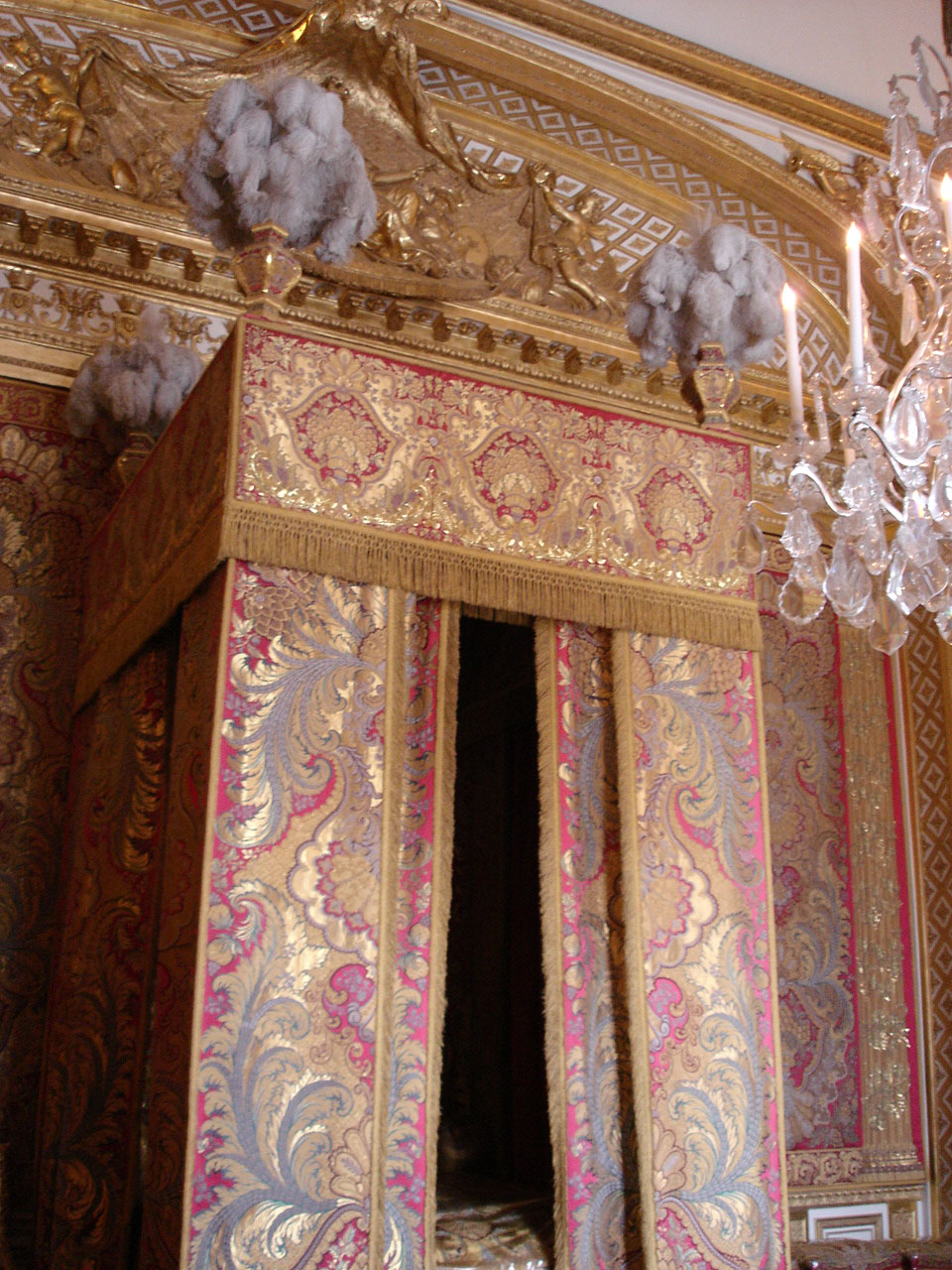
"Chambre de Louis XIV" Robert de Cotte

The present brocade on the walls of the alcove and for the bed has been rewoven as part of the initiative of the Fifth Republic to restore Versailles. The original alcove and bed hangings were restored in 1736; and, in 1785, Louis XVI ordered the brocade burned from which he obtained over 60 kilograms of gold. The present hanging, while accurate for the period, are not a reproduction of the brocade that originally hung in the chambre de Louis XIV. Owing to lack of archival information when the project was undertaken, it was decided to use the pattern for hangings of the tenture d'hiver for the queen's bedroom. Only after the project was underway were the original designs found; as the part of the project had been completed, it was decided to use the queen's tenture d'hiver.

== Cabinet du conseil ==
The cabinet de conseil came into being as a council chamber upon the construction of the Salon of War, which occupied site of the Salon de Jupiter, Louis XIV's previous council chamber. Initially called cabinet du roi from 1684, with the remodeling of the apartment that occurred in 1701, this room received a new decor that featured walls paneled with mirrors. With the redecoration, the room was rechristened cabinet des glaces. In spite of the luxury of mirrors, this room was furnished in a utilitarian manner. In addition to the velvet covered council table, there were three armchairs and 12 folding stools and a daybed, which Louis XIV used in 1686 as a necessity while suffering from an anal fistula and the surgery that removed it.

Of all the rooms of the appartement du roi, this room perhaps best expressed the personal tastes of Louis XIV. In addition to the collection of gems, there were works by Nicolas Poussin and Giovanni Lanfranco on the walls as well as Harpsichord with a painted case. The personal nature of this room was offset by the fact that this was the room in which Louis XIV governed France. Councils were held here, writers who extolled the gloire of the Sun King were received here, and private audiences most often occurred in this room.

The last room of the appartement du roi was the cabinet des termes – due to the decor that featured 20 Hermes – also called the cabinet des perruques, as this was the room in which Louis XIV's wigs were stored. In addition to the gilt Hermes that decorated the wall, the doors were covered with mirrors. The room served as a changing room for the King, where he would change his shirt, wig, and hat as many as four times a day. In the evening, this room would be where Louis XIV would gather with his children, other members of his family, and selected courtiers.

The cabinet des glaces and the cabinet des perruques disappeared in 1755 when Louis XV ordered the enlargement and redecoration of the council chamber. This is the room that is seen today.

In 1748, in order to accommodate the newly constructed cabinet du roi on the 3rd floor, Louis XV had the ceiling of the cabinet de glaces lowered by about a meter. The new dimension to the room necessitated a complete redecoration of the room. The following year, a new fireplace was installed and the one dating from the time of Louis XIV and was sent to Compiègne. In 1755, during the installation of a terrace in the cour des cerfs, Louis XV decided to enlarge the council room by incorporating the cabinet des perruques. This larger room was designed by Ange-Jacques Gabriel with the paneling sculpted by Jules-Antoine Rousseau. The panels were sculpted with symbols appropriate to governance: trophies of peace and war, attributes of the army, navy, justice, and the insignia of the monarchy.

== Sources ==
- Baillie, Hugh Murray (1967). "Etiquette and the Planning of State Apartements in Baroque Palaces." Archeologia CI, 169–199.
- Félibien, Jean-François (1703). Description sommaire de Versailles ancienne et nouvelle. Paris: A. Chrétien.
- Kimball, Fiske (1946). "Unknown Versailles: The appartement du Roi, 1678–1701." Gazette des Beaux-Arts 6 pér., vol. 29, 85–112.
- Meyer, Daniel (1989). "L'ameublement de la chambre de Louis XIV à Versailles de 1701 à nos jours." Gazette des Beaux-Arts 6 pér., vol. 113 February, 79–104.
- Piganiol de la Force, Jean-Aymar (1701). Nouvelle description des châteaux et parcs de Versailles et Marly. Paris: Chez Florentin de la lune.
- Saule, Béatrix; Meyer, Daniel (2000). Versailles Visitor's Guide. Versailles: Éditions Art-Lys. ISBN 9782854951172.
- Verlet, Pierre (1985). Le château de Versailles. Paris: Librairie Arthème Fayard.
