= History of the Palace of Versailles =

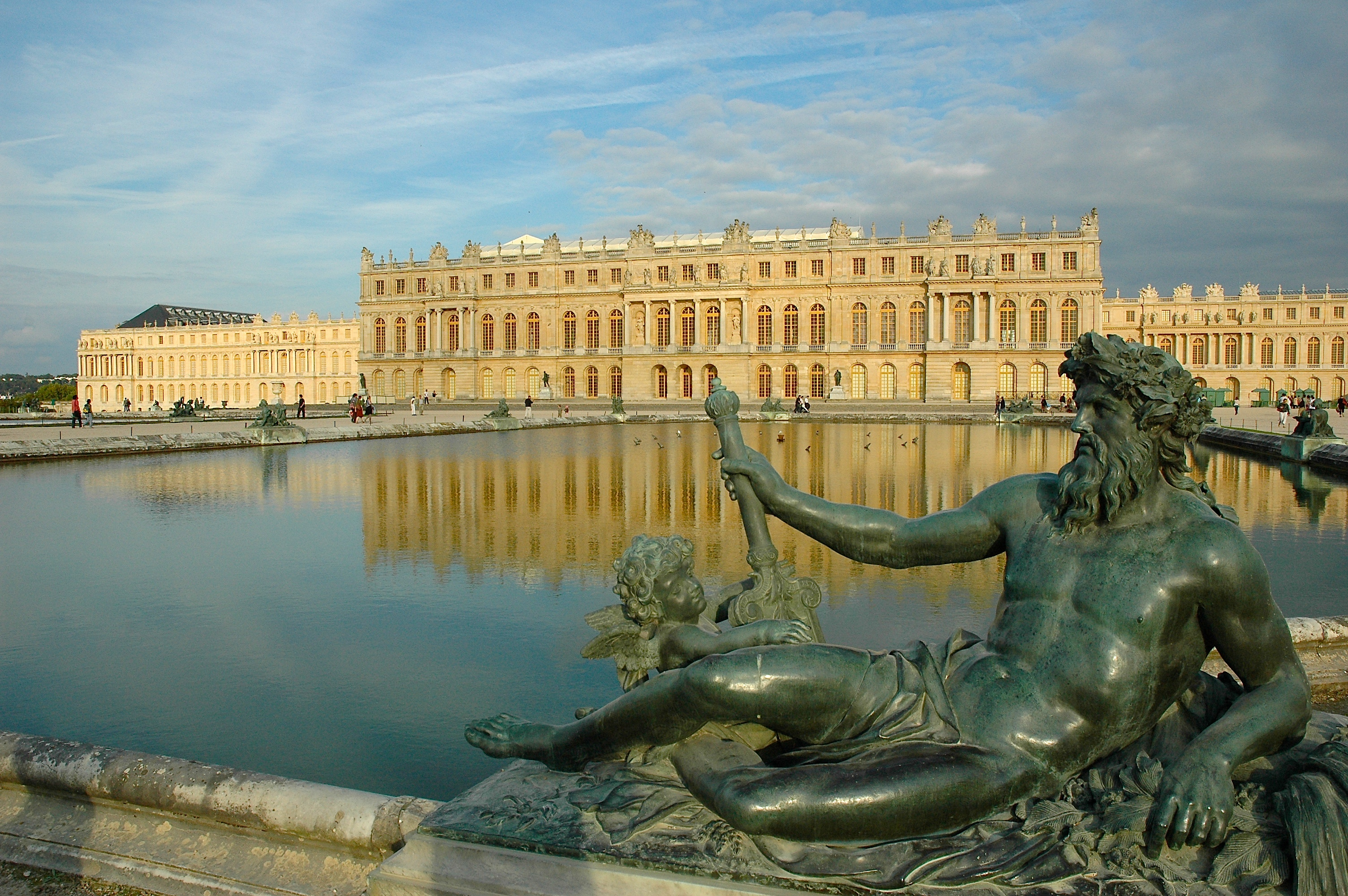
The main construction of Versailles took place in four campaigns between 1664 and 1710

Palace of Versailles, the building's evolution

The Palace of Versailles is a royal château in Versailles, Yvelines, in the Île-de-France region of France. When the château was built, Versailles was a country village; today, however, it is a suburb of Paris, some 20 kilometres southwest of the French capital. The court of Versailles was the centre of political power in France from 1682, when Louis XIV moved from Paris, until the royal family was forced to return to the capital in October 1789 after the beginning of the French Revolution. Versailles is therefore famous not only as a building, but as well as a symbol of the system of absolute monarchy of the Ancien Régime.

== Origins ==
The earliest mention of the name of Versailles is found in a document which predates 1038, the Charter of the Saint-Père de Chartres Abbey, in which one of the signatories was a certain Hugo de Versailliis (Hugues de Versailles), who was seigneur of Versailles.

During this period, the village of Versailles centred on a small castle and church, and the area was governed by a local lord. Its location on the road from Paris to Dreux and Normandy brought some prosperity to the village but, following an outbreak of the Plague and the Hundred Years' War, the village was largely destroyed, and its population sharply declined. In 1575, Albert de Gondi, a naturalized Florentine who gained prominence at the court of Henry II, purchased the seigneury of Versailles.

== Ancien Régime ==
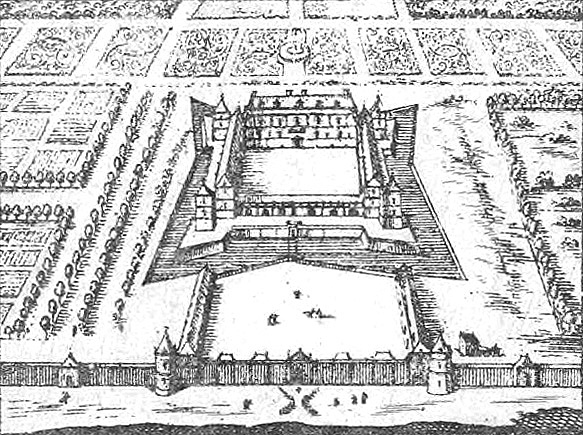
The château, c. 1630–1640, as shown on the map of Jacques Gomboust

=== Louis XIII ===
In the early seventeenth century, Gondi invited Louis XIII on several hunting trips in the forests surrounding Versailles. Pleased with the location, Louis ordered the construction of a hunting lodge in 1624. Designed by Philibert Le Roy, the structure, a small château, was constructed of stone and red brick, with a based roof. Eight years later, Louis obtained the seigneury of Versailles from the Gondi family and began to make enlargements to the château.

A vignette of Versailles from the 1652 Paris map of Jacques Gomboust shows a traditional design: an entrance court with a corps de logis on the far western end, flanked by secondary wings on the north and south sides, and closed off by an entrance screen. Adjacent exterior towers were located at the four corners, with the entire structure surrounded by a moat. This was preceded by two service wings, creating a forecourt with a grilled entrance marked by two round towers. The vignette also shows a garden on the western side of the château with a fountain on the central axis and rectangular planted parterres to either side.

Louis XIV had played and hunted at the site as a boy. With a few modifications, this structure would become the core of the new palace.

=== Louis XIV ===
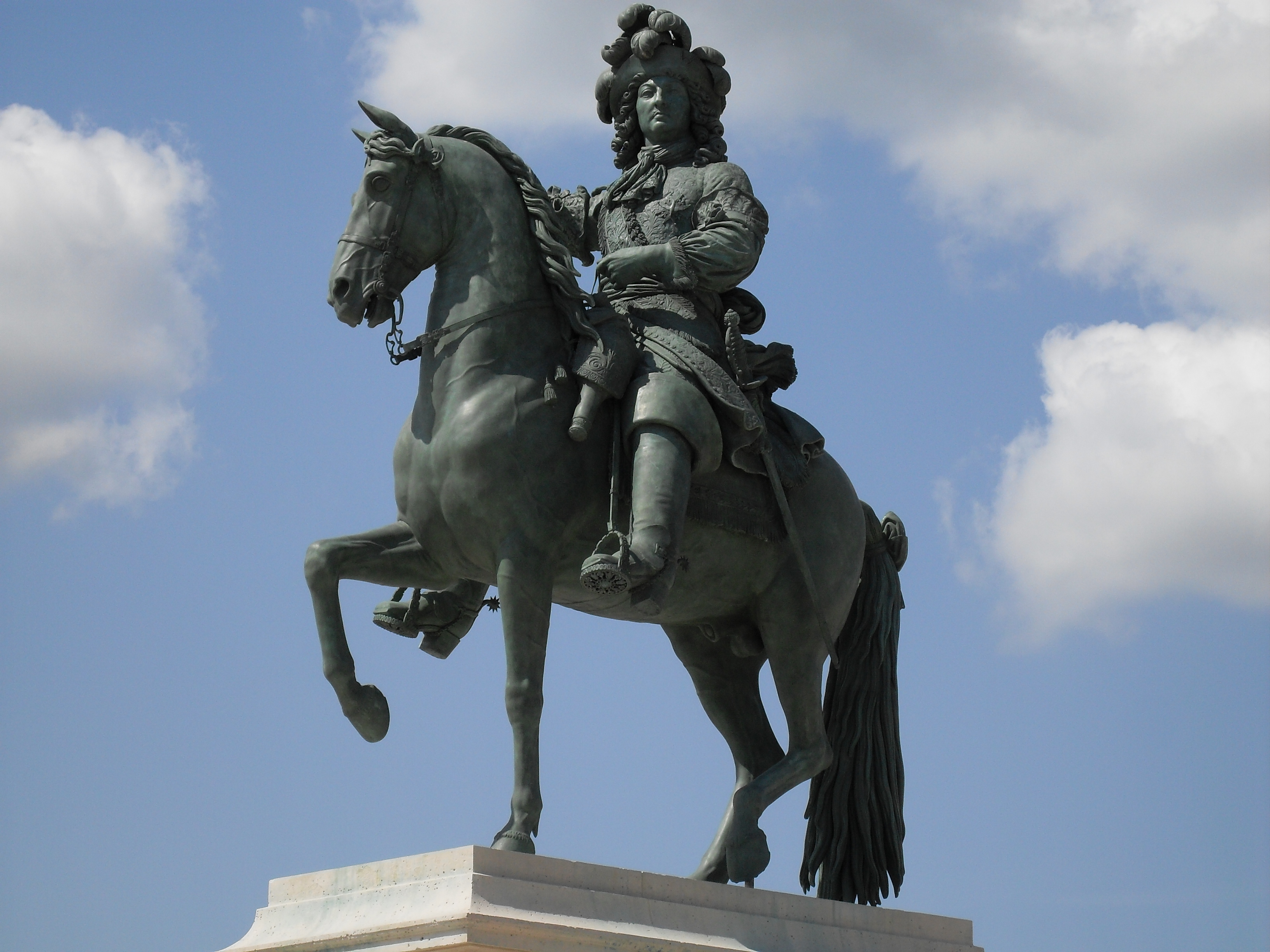
Statue of Louis XIV in Versailles

Louis XIII's successor, Louis XIV, chose the royal hunting lodge at Versailles as his main residence, and over several decades expanded it into one of the largest palaces in the world. Beginning in 1661, the architect Louis Le Vau, landscape architect André Le Nôtre, and painter-decorator Charles Le Brun began a detailed renovation and expansion of the château. This was done to fulfill Louis XIV's desire to establish a new centre for the royal court. Following the Treaties of Nijmegen in 1678, he began to gradually move the court to Versailles. The court was officially established there on 6 May 1682.

By moving his court and government to Versailles, Louis XIV hoped to extract more control of the government from the nobility and to distance himself from the population of Paris. From February 10, 1671, on, he never spent a night in Paris, and during the subsequent 45 years, he visited his nominal capital only 18 times. In addition to whatever fear of the Parisian masses he harboured, he was motivated, according to historian Philip Mansel, by "his desire for more freedom with his mistresses, more space in which to drill troops and, above all, his growing love of country pleasures - hunting, riding, gardening, walking." All the power of the Kingdom of France now emanated from Versailles: there were government offices, as well as the homes of thousands of courtiers, their retinues, and all the attendant functionaries of court. By requiring that nobles of a certain rank and position spend time each year at Versailles, Louis prevented them from developing their own regional power at the expense of his own and kept them from countering his efforts to centralise the French government in an absolute monarchy. The meticulous and strict court etiquette that Louis established, which overwhelmed his heirs with its petty boredom, was epitomised in the elaborate ceremonies and exacting procedures that accompanied his rising in the morning, known as the Lever, divided into a petit lever for the most important and a grand lever for the whole court. Like other French court manners, much of the Versailles étiquette was quickly imitated in other European courts.

According to historian Philip Mansel, the king turned the palace into:

an irresistible combination of marriage market, employment agency and entertainment capital of aristocratic Europe, boasting the best theater, opera, music, gambling, sex and (most important) hunting.

The expansion of the château became synonymous with the absolutism of Louis XIV. In 1661, following the death of Cardinal Mazarin, chief minister of the government, Louis had declared that he would be his own chief minister. The idea of establishing the court at Versailles was conceived to ensure that all of his advisors and provincial rulers would be kept close to him. He feared that they would rise up against him and start a revolt and believed that if he kept all of his potential threats near him, they would be powerless. After the disgrace of Nicolas Fouquet in 1661 – Louis claimed the Superintendent of Finances would not have been able to build his grand château at Vaux-le-Vicomte without having embezzled from the crown – Louis, after the confiscation of Fouquet's estate, employed the talents of Le Vau, Le Nôtre, and Le Brun, who all had worked on Vaux-le-Vicomte, for his building campaigns at Versailles and elsewhere. For Versailles, there were four distinct building campaigns (after minor alterations and enlargements had been executed on the château and the gardens in 1662–1663), all of which corresponded to Louis XIV's wars.

==== First building campaign ====
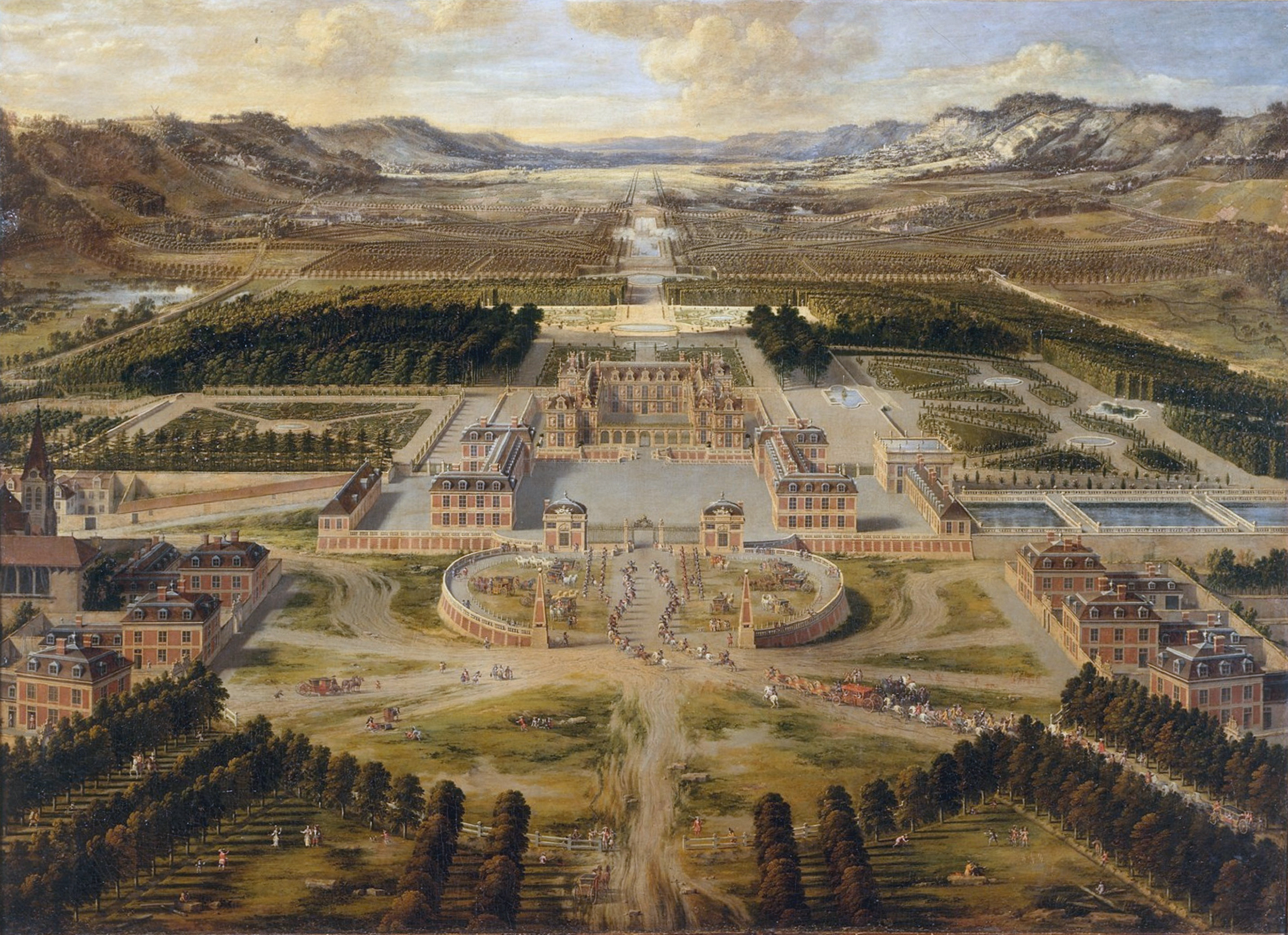
The château circa 1668, as painted by Pierre Patel (Versailles Museum)

The first building campaign (1664–1668) commenced with The Pleasures of the Enchanted Island of 1664, a fête that was held between 7 and 13 May 1664. The fête was ostensibly given to celebrate the two queens of France – Anne of Austria, the queen mother, and Maria Theresa of Spain, Louis XIV's wife – but in reality honored the king's mistress, Louise de La Vallière. The celebration of The Pleasures of the Enchanted Island is often regarded as a prelude to the War of Devolution, which Louis waged against Spain. The first building campaign (1664–1668) involved alterations in the château and gardens to accommodate the 600 guests invited to the party.

==== Second building campaign ====
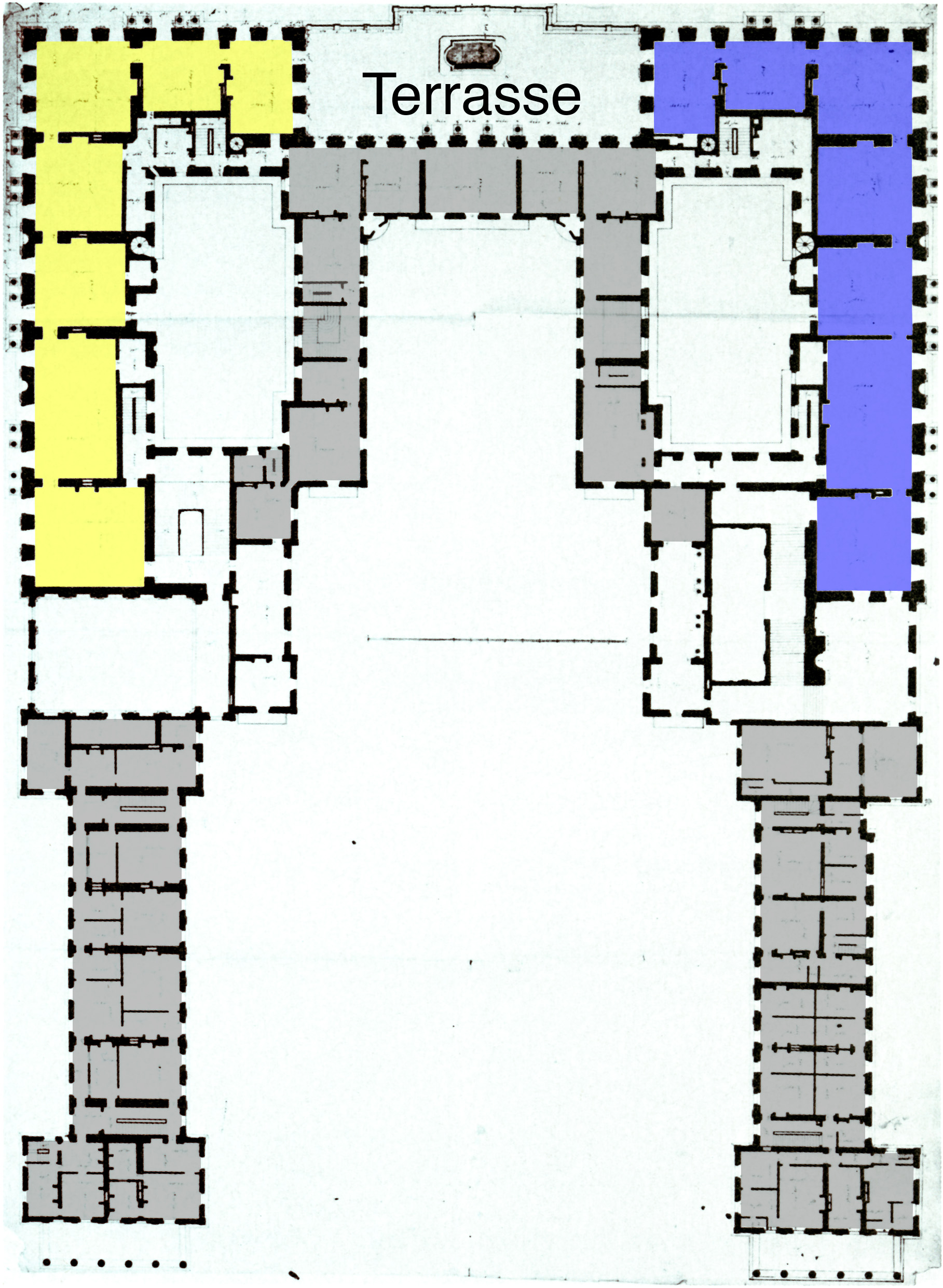
Plan of the main floor (c. 1676), showing Le Vau's enveloppe with the grand appartement du roi in blue and the grand appartement de la reine in yellow. The old château is shown in gray. The terrace overlooked the central parterre of the gardens of Versailles.

The second building campaign (1669–1672) was inaugurated with the signing of the Treaty of Aix-la-Chapelle, which ended the War of Devolution. During this campaign, the château began to assume some of the appearance that it has today. The most important modification of the château was Le Vau's envelope of Louis XIII's hunting lodge. The enveloppe – often referred to as the château neuf to distinguish it from the older structure of Louis XIII – enclosed the hunting lodge on the north, west, and south. For a time between late 1668 and early 1669, when the ground floor of the enveloppe was being constructed, Louis XIV intended to completely demolish his father's palace and replace it with a monumental forecourt. Le Vau's design imagined a large extension of the enveloppe westwards, enabling huge galleries and staircases to be built. In June 1669 Louis XIV decided to keep his father's hunting lodge, so the architectural plans for the enveloppe had to be reconfigured and the scale of the new rooms reduced.

The new structure provided new lodgings for the King and members of his family. The main floor – the piano nobile – of the château neuf was given over entirely to two apartments: one for the King, and one for the Queen. The grand appartement du roi occupied the northern part of the château neuf and grand appartement de la reine occupied the southern part.

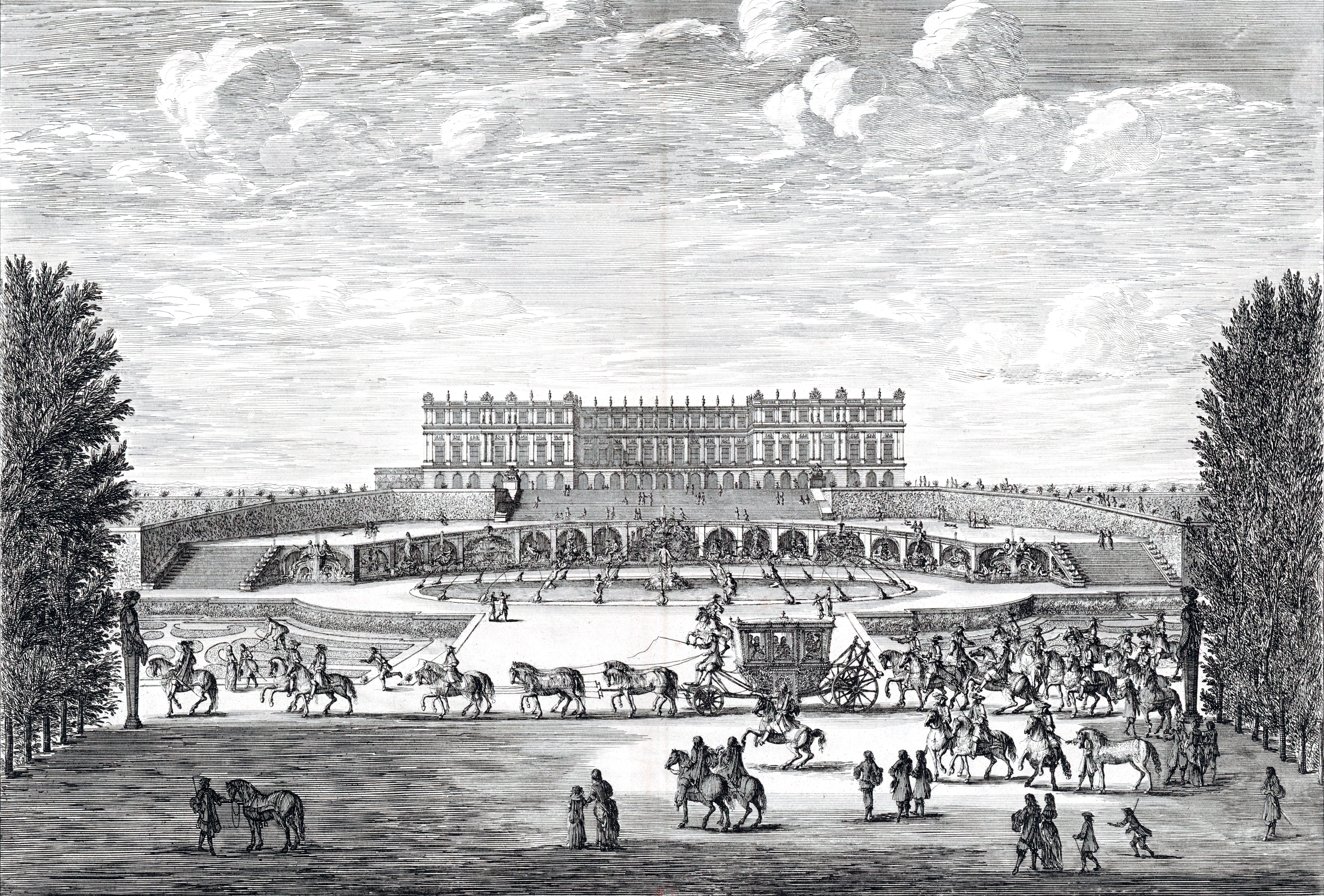
View of the garden front, 1674, after the second building capmpaign, engraving by Israël Silvestre

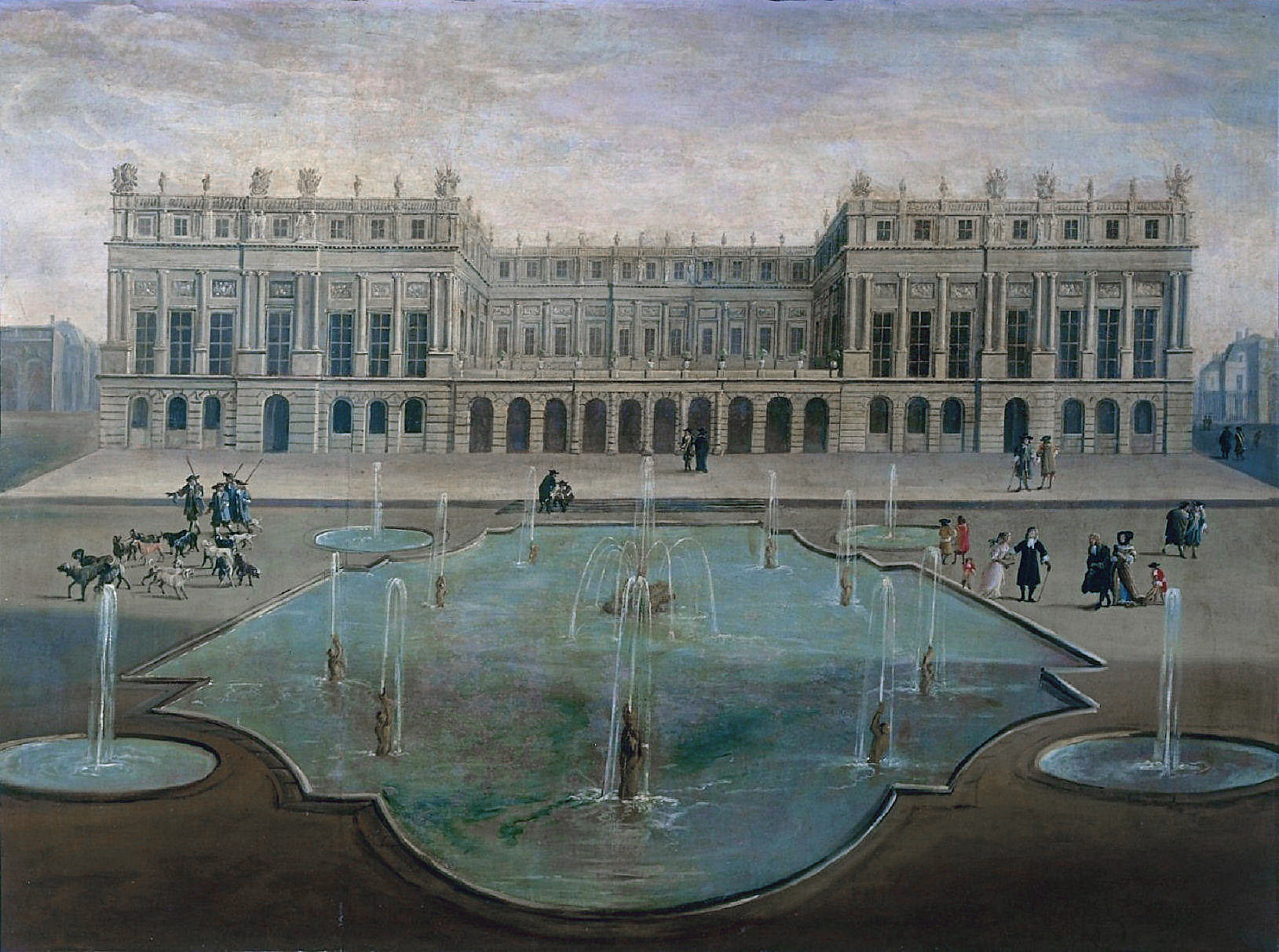
Garden façade of the Palace of Versailles, ca. 1675, with the terrace that later became the Hall of Mirrors

The western part of the enveloppe was given over almost entirely to a terrace, which was later enclosed with the construction of the Hall of Mirrors (Galerie des Glaces). The ground floor of the northern part of the château neuf was occupied by the appartement des bains, which included a sunken octagonal tub with hot and cold running water. The King's brother and sister-in-law, Philippe I, Duke of Orléans and Elizabeth Charlotte, Madame Palatine occupied apartments on the ground floor of the southern part of the château neuf. The upper story of the château neuf was reserved for private rooms for the king to the north and rooms for the King's children above the Queen's apartment to the south.

Significant to the design and construction of the grands appartements is that the rooms of both apartments are of the same configuration and dimensions – a hitherto unprecedented feature in French palace design. It has been suggested that this parallel configuration was intentional as Louis XIV had intended to establish Maria Theresa as queen of Spain, and thus thereby establish a dual monarchy. Louis XIV's rationale for the joining of the two kingdoms was seen largely as recompense for Philip IV's failure to pay his daughter Maria Theresa's dowry, which was among the terms to which Spain agreed with the promulgation of the Treaty of the Pyrenees, which ended the war between France and Spain that began in 1635 during the Thirty Years' War. Louis XIV regarded his father-in-law's act as a breach of the treaty and consequently engaged in the War of Devolution.

Both the grand appartement du roi and the grand appartement de la reine formed a suite of seven enfilade rooms. Each room is dedicated to one of the then known celestial bodies and is personified by the appropriate Greco-Roman deity. The decoration of the rooms, which was conducted under Le Brun's direction depicted the "heroic actions of the king" and were represented in allegorical form by the actions of historical figures from the antique past (Alexander the Great, Augustus, Cyrus, etc.).

==== Third building campaign ====
With the signing of the Treaty of Nijmegen in 1678, which ended the Franco-Dutch War, the third building campaign at Versailles began (1678–1684). The court had grown during the 1670s as Louis XIV re-shaped his relationship with the high aristocracy. To enjoy his favor it became indispensable to attend Louis wherever he went, placing a strain on the existing accommodation for courtiers at Versailles. The royal family had also grown sizeably, augmented by the legitimization of Louis' five children by his mistress Madame de Montespan between 1673 and 1681. As newly forged Princes of the Blood all of these children required suitable apartments at Versailles.

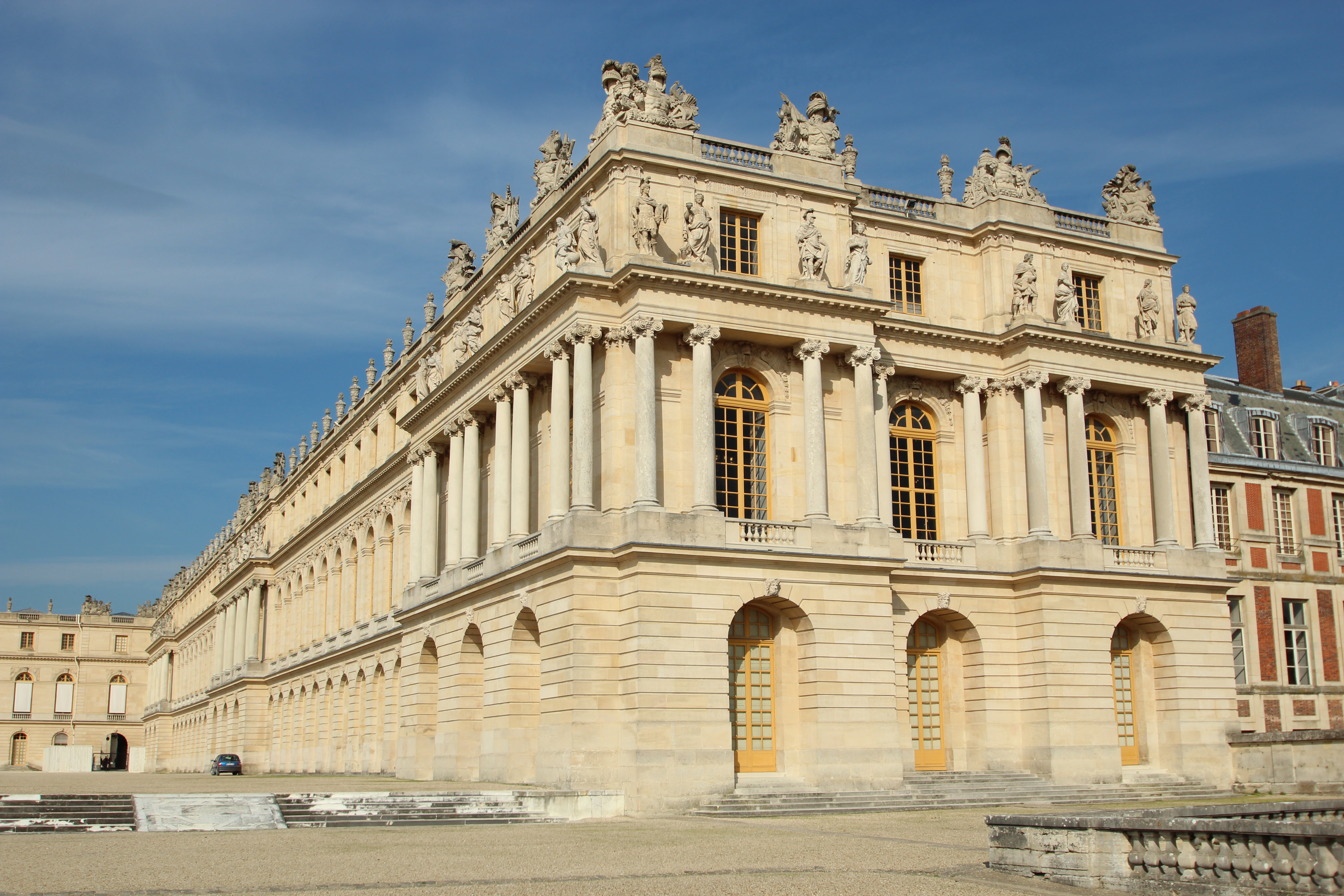
The South Wing of the château, overlooking the gardens. Construction commenced in 1679.

Under the direction of the chief architect, Jules Hardouin-Mansart, the Palace of Versailles acquired much of the look that it has today during the 1680s. Le Brun was occupied not only with the interior decoration of the new additions of the palace, but also collaborated with Le Nôtre's in landscaping the palace gardens. As symbol of France's new prominence as a European super-power, Louis XIV officially installed his court at Versailles in May 1682.

Hardouin-Mansart designed two new monumental wings to address Versailles's accommodation problems: the South Wing, known as the Aile des Princes because it housed the Princes of the Blood, was the first to be built in 1679. The South Wing is 176 yards long (528 feet), and was built with three interior courtyards capable of housing servants and aristocrats in addition to the Princes of the Blood, who were given luxurious apartments behind the west façade overlooking the gardens. In 1684 construction commenced on the North Wing, which would house members of the high aristocracy; between the two new wings 175 new lodgings were created. Both wings replicated the Italianate façade of Le Vau's enveloppe on their western sides, creating a uniform and symmetrical appearance on the garden front.

Major outbuildings of considerable grandeur in themselves were also built during the third phase, including the Grand Commun, the Orangerie, the Grand Trianon, and the pair of stables known as the Petite and Grand Ecurie. The Orangerie required excavating the hillside descending south from the palace, which allowed the construction of a 500 foot long arcaded gallery with shorter wings extending at right angles, buttressed against the hill above. This cost roughly 1.1 million livres between 1684 and 1685, with construction completed in 1686. Mansart's imposing Grand Commun was built on the site of the old village church of Versailles, St. Julien, east of the new South Wing of the palace, between 1682 and 1684. An enormous rectangle arranged around a central courtyard, the Grand Commun was a dormitory for members of the King's household, intended to provide 103 new lodgings.

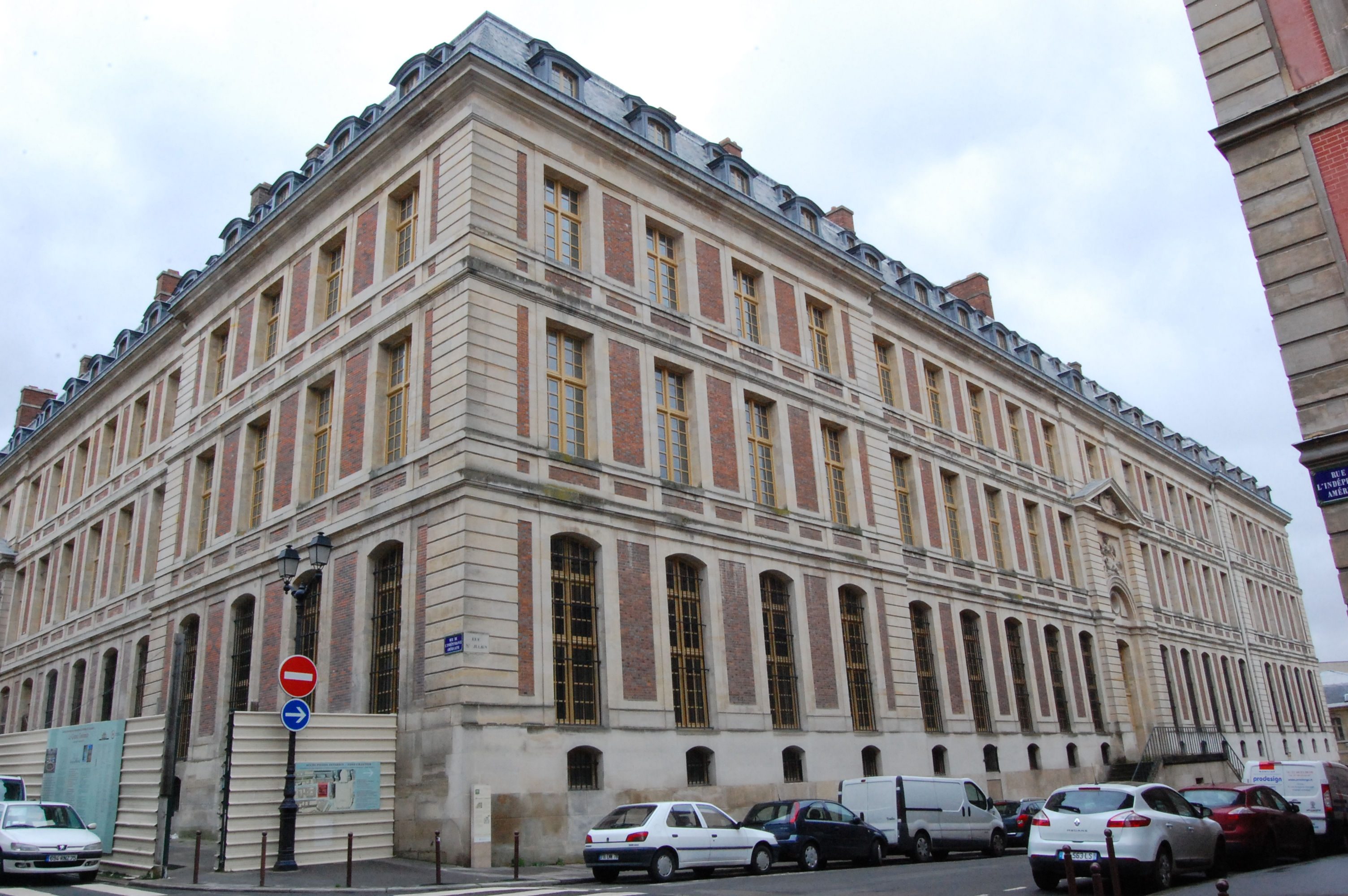
Mansart's Grand Commons, built between 1682 and 1684 to house members of the King's household

The largest and most imposing outbuildings were the two stables, the Grand and the Petit Ecurie, constructed between 1679 and 1682. The Royal Stables were given pride of place opposite the Cour d'Armes in front of the main palace, on either side of the Avenue de Paris, the main approach to Versailles from Paris. Far from being simply utilitarian, Hardouin-Mansart designed two Neoclassical buildings of equal size and grandeur, capable of housing thousands of horses and the nearly 1,500 men employed in the household department of the Royal Stables. The "Grand" Stable housed the King's hunting horses and hounds, while the "Petit" Stable contained the King's carriages and other transport.

The third phase saw the re-configuration of major parts of the Grand Apartments of both the King and the Queen. Louis XIV ceased to inhabit the rooms of his Grand Apartment, the salons of which were instead used for purposes of state and ceremony. Between the new Hall of Mirrors to the west and the Staircase of the Ambassadors to the east, the Grand Apartment created one huge route for entertainment and palace fêtes. The King's former bedchamber became a throne room known as the Salon d'Apollon, while the neighboring Salon de Mercure contained a state bed partitioned from the public area by a solid silver balustrade. The Grand Apartments were furnished sumptuously with objects from the Gobelins Manufactory, showcasing the very best in French decorative arts and craftmanship. The most extravagant ornaments were those made from solid silver at the Gobelins, to the cost of some 10 million livres. There were 167 such objects on display between the Hall of Mirrors and the Grand Apartment in 1687, ranging from candelabras, gueridons and statues, to urns, stools, and incense burners.

For the new appartement du roi, Louis chose the set of eight rooms on the piano nobile behind the west façade of the Cour de Marbre which had once belonged to his father in the old château. To create a suitably sumptuous approach, the rooms behind the south façade overlooking the Cour de Marbre were modified to create three large antechambers (the vestibule, Salle des gardes du roi, and the Première Antichambre) preceding the King's bedchamber, followed by the Grand Salon at the center of the west façade. The Queen continued to inhabit her own Grand Apartment, albeit with some modifications. In 1680 the Salon of Mars which had served as the Queen's guard-room was converted into a dining room for the Grand Couvert, a daily ritual in which the King and Queen ate their midday meal together in view of the court. Another antechamber just east of the new dining room was then converted into a replacement guard room. After the death of the Queen in 1683, one of the rooms from her Grand Apartment, between the south and west facades, was transformed into the Deuxième Antichambre of the Appartement du roi.

==== Fourth building campaign ====
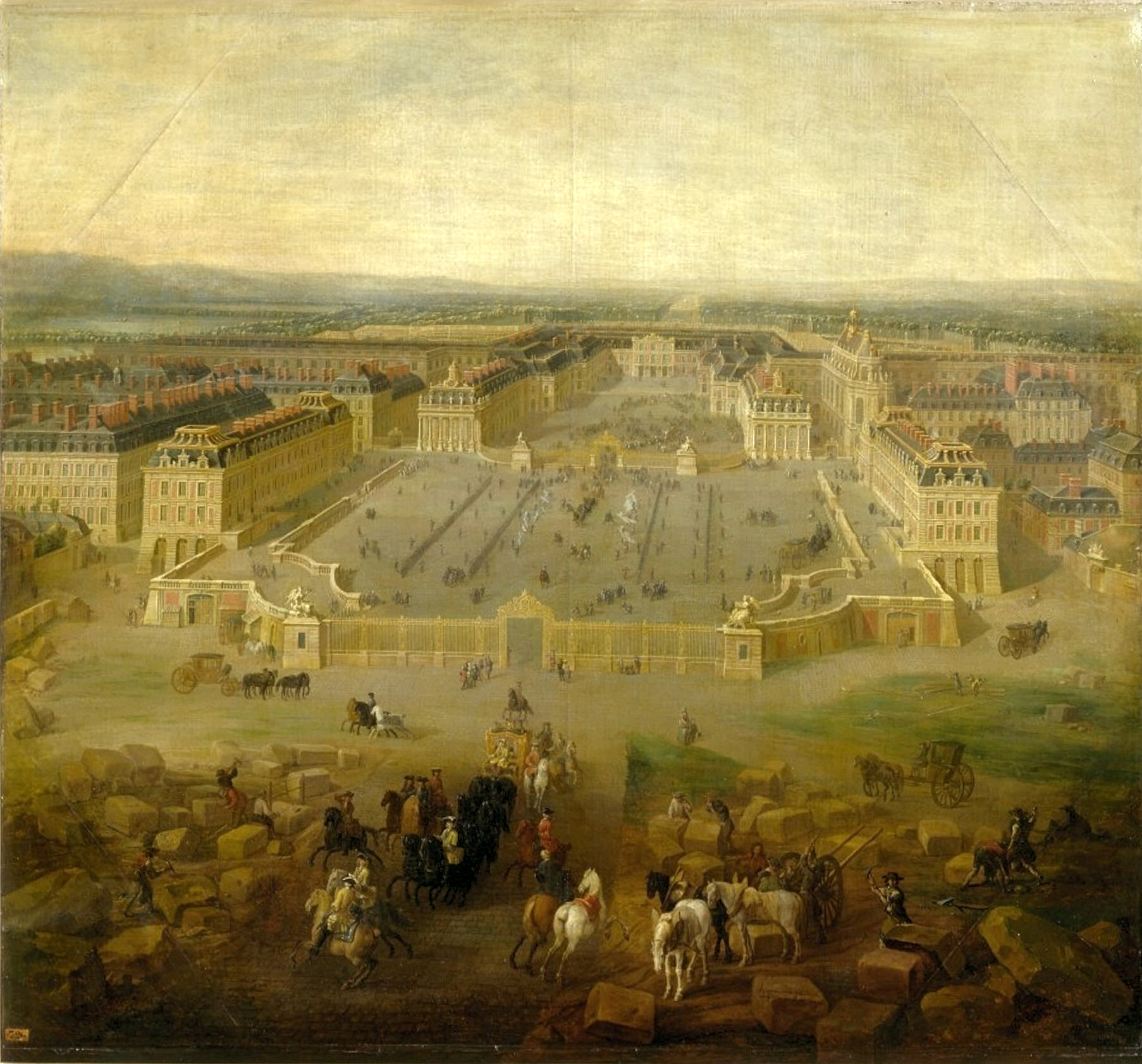
View from the Place d'Armes, ca. 1722, by Pierre-Denis Martin (1663-1742)

Soon after the crushing defeat of the War of the League of Augsburg (1688–1697) and owing possibly to the pious influence of Madame de Maintenon, Louis XIV undertook his last building campaign at Versailles. The fourth building campaign (1699–1710) concentrated almost exclusively on construction of the royal chapel designed by Hardouin-Mansart and finished by Robert de Cotte and his team of decorative designers. In 1701 there were further modifications in the appartement du roi, namely the construction of the Salon de l'Œil de Bœuf and the King's Bedchamber. This was achieved by eliminating the wall between the Deuxième Antichambre and the old bedchamber of the King, creating one much larger antechamber in the process, the Chambre de l'Oeil de Boeuf. The neighboring Grand Salon was then converted into the new bedchamber of the king, which now sat squarely at the center of the west façade over the Cour de Marbre. With the completion of the chapel in 1710, virtually all construction at Versailles ceased; building would not be resumed at Versailles until some twenty one years later during the reign of Louis XV.

Plans of the evolution of Versailles
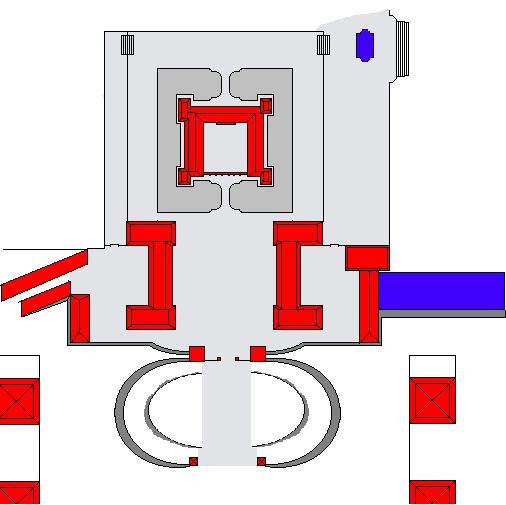
The palace in 1668

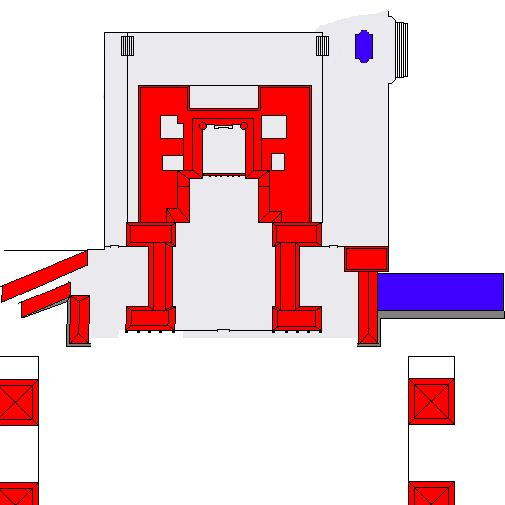
The palace in 1674

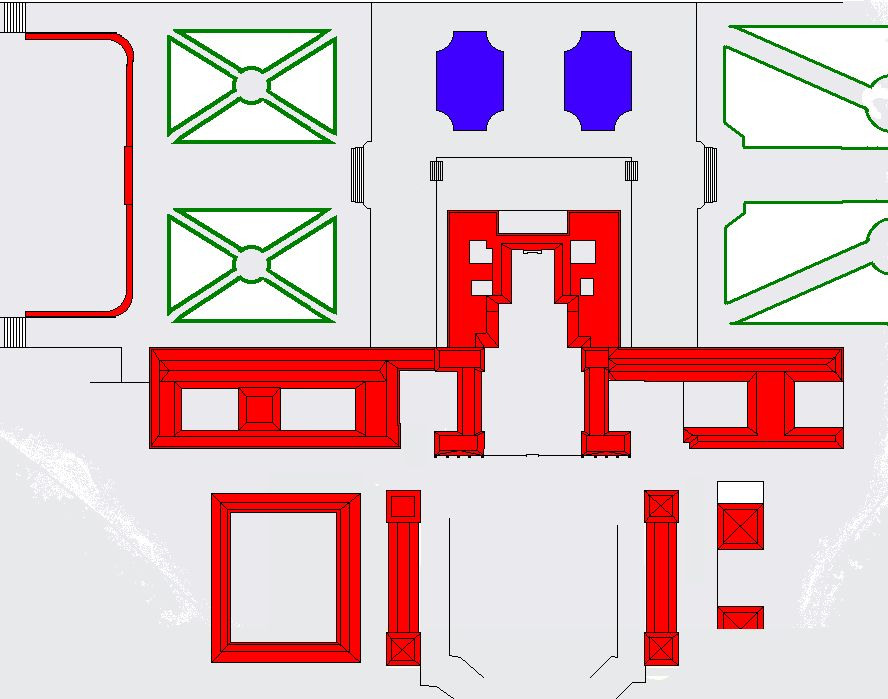
The palace in 1680

=== Louis XV ===
After the death of Louis XIV in 1715, the five-year-old King Louis XV, the court, and the Régence government of Philippe II, Duke of Orléans returned to Paris. In May 1717, during his visit to France, the Russian Tsar Peter the Great stayed at the Grand Trianon. His time at Versailles was used to observe and study the palace and gardens, which he later used as a source of inspiration when he built Peterhof on the Bay of Finland, west of Saint Petersburg.

During the reign of Louis XV, Versailles underwent transformation but not on the scale that had been seen during his predecessor's reign. When Louis XV and the court returned to Versailles in 1722, the first project was the completion of the Salon d'Hercule, which had been begun during the last years of Louis XIV's reign but was never finished due to the King's death.

Significant among Louis XV's contributions to Versailles were the petit appartement du roi; the appartements des Mesdames, the appartement du dauphin, the appartement de la dauphine on the ground floor; and the two private apartments of Louis XV – petit appartement du roi au deuxième étage (later transformed into the appartement de Madame du Barry) and the petit appartement du roi au troisième étage – on the second and third floors of the palace. The crowning achievements of Louis XV's reign were the construction of the Opera and the Petit Trianon.

Equally significant was the destruction of the Escalier des Ambassadeurs (Ambassadors' Stair), the only fitting approach to the State Apartments, which Louis XV undertook to make way for apartments for his daughters. The case for removing the Escalier was strengthened by the poor condition of the cast bronze support for the massive skylight over the staircase, which under Louis XIV had been an experimental wonder which allowed for an unprecedented span of the glass. By the 1750s this structure had seriously weakened, necessitating the removal of the skylight and the destruction of the staircase.

The gardens remained largely unchanged from the time of Louis XIV; the completion of the Bassin de Neptune between 1738 and 1741 was the most important legacy Louis XV made to the gardens.

Towards the end of his reign, Louis XV, under the advice of Ange-Jacques Gabriel, began to remodel the courtyard façades of the palace. With the objective revetting the entrance of the palace with classical façades, Louis XV began a project that was continued during the reign of Louis XVI, but which did not see completion until the 20th century.

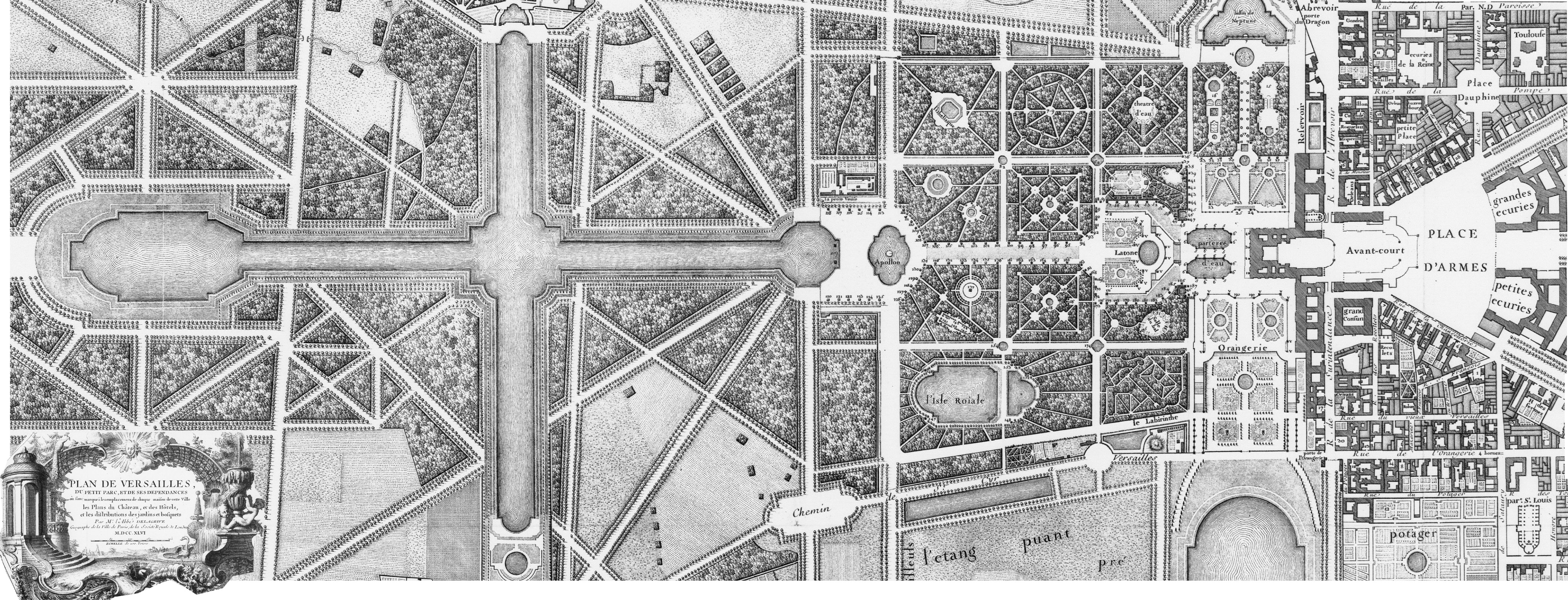
Gardens and palace of Versailles in 1746, by the abbot Delagrive

=== Louis XVI ===
In 1774, shortly after his ascension, Louis XVI ordered an extensive replanting of the bosquets of the gardens, since many of the century-old trees had died. Only a few changes to Le Nôtre's design were made: some bosquets were removed, others altered, including the Bains d'Apollon (north of the Parterre de Latone), which was redone after a design by Hubert Robert in anglo-chinois style (popular during the late 18th century), and the Labyrinth (at the southern edge of the garden) was converted to the small Jardin de la Reine.

The worsening finances of the French monarchy led to neglect in the maintenance of the palace. Benjamin Franklin described an air of "magnificence and negligence" when he visited, while royal architects warned of the dangerous condition of outbuildings like the Petit and Grand Ecurie (stables), where rotting timber in 1770 necessitated urgent rebuilding work.

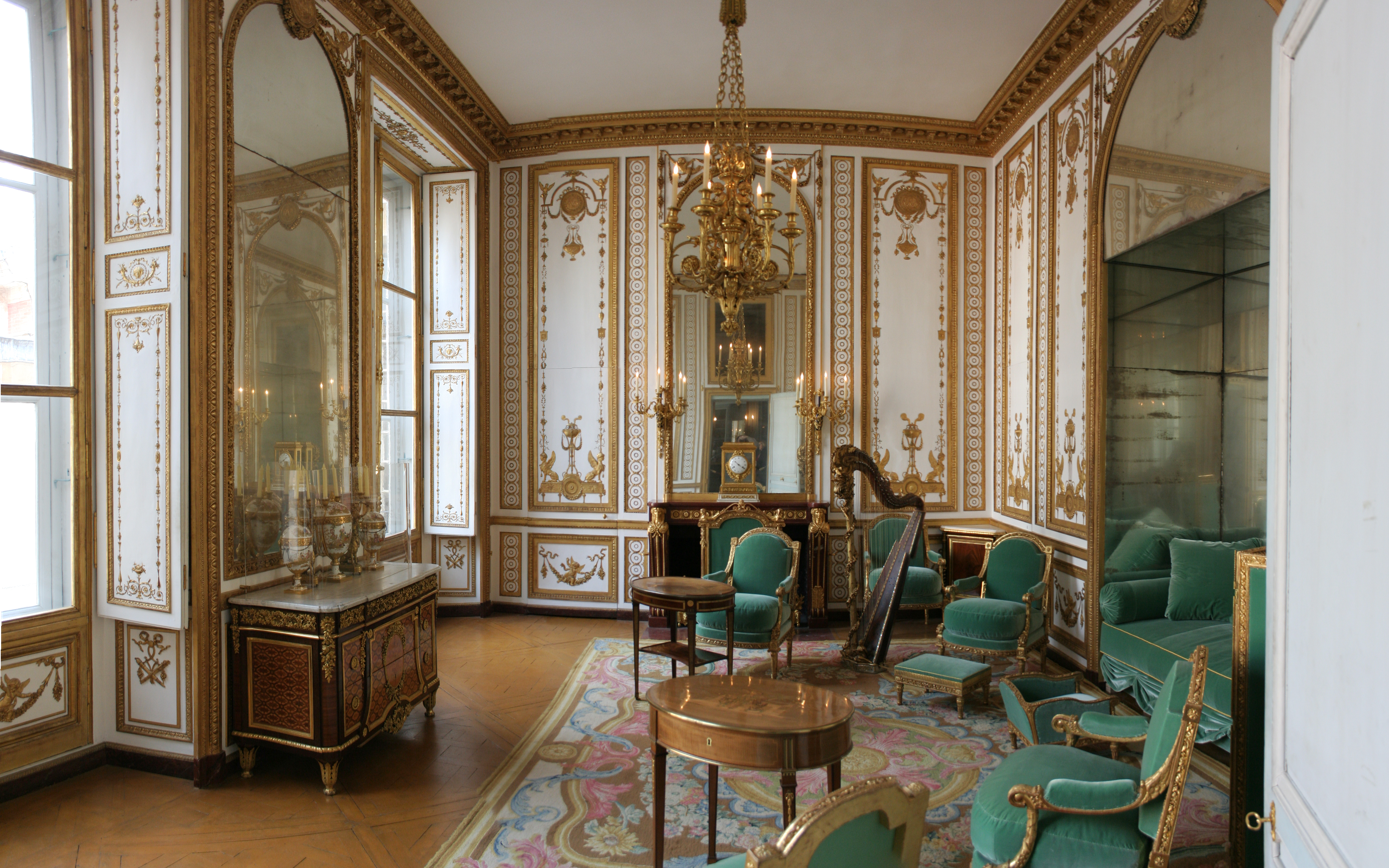
The Cabinet doré, one of several rooms in the petit appartement of Marie Antoinette redecorated by Richard Mique in the Louis XVI style.

To compound the shortage of money, Louis XVI channeled significant financial resources into other properties, including the purchase and renovation of the Chateau de Saint-Cloud in 1784, and an ongoing rebuilding of the Château de Compiègne throughout the 1780s. This left scant resources available to devote towards the long-nurtured dream of rebuilding the Paris-facing wings of the Enveloppe enclosing the Marble and Royal Courts, known as the "Grand Project". In 1780 Louis XVI completed the Gabriel Wing reconstruction begun by his grandfather, and he had plans to extend the rebuilding. In 1779, the Royal Buildings Office invited architects to submit designs for the "Grand Project", the goal being to harmonize the new Neoclassical Gabriel wing with the antiquated Louis XIII style of the southern wing and the original hunting lodge façade on the Marble Court. Ultimately, the advent of the debt crisis in the French government in 1787 and the beginning of the French Revolution spelled an end to any such plans.

In the interior of the palace, the library and the salon des jeux in the petit appartement du roi and the petit appartement de la reine, redecorated by Richard Mique for Marie Antoinette, are among the finest examples of the Louis XVI style. Several stories for the petit appartement du roi were added above those already constructed by Louis XV, reaching six stories high. Louis XVI was known to walk on the roof and enjoy the commanding views, sometimes sitting with a telescope to peer at the courtiers milling around in the forecourts beneath him. These additional floors, which loomed awkwardly above the Cour de Marbre and the main roofline of the palace, were intended to be temporary pending the long-awaited Grand Project. They were demolished in the 19th century in order to restore the appearance of the façade as it existed under Louis XIV.

== French Revolution ==
On 6 October 1789, the royal family had to leave Versailles and move to the Tuileries Palace in Paris, as a result of the Women's March on Versailles. During the early years of the French Revolution, preservation of the palace was largely in the hands of the citizens of Versailles. In October 1790, Louis XVI ordered the palace to be emptied of its furniture, requesting that most be sent to the Tuileries Palace. In response to the order, the mayor of Versailles and the municipal council met to draft a letter to Louis XVI in which they stated that if the furniture was removed, it would certainly precipitate economic ruin on the city. A deputation from Versailles met with the King on 12 October after which Louis XVI, touched by the sentiments of the residents of Versailles, rescinded the order.

Eight months later, however, the fate of Versailles was sealed: on 21 June 1791, Louis XVI was arrested at Varennes after which the Legislative Assembly accordingly declared that all possessions of the royal family had been abandoned. To safeguard the palace, the assembly ordered the palace of Versailles to be sealed. On 20 October 1792 a letter was read before the National Convention in which Jean-Marie Roland de la Platière, interior minister, proposed that the furnishings of the palace and those of the residences in Versailles that had been abandoned be sold and that the palace be either sold or rented. The sale of furniture transpired at auctions held between 23 August 1793 and 30 nivôse an III (19 January 1795). Only items of particular artistic or intellectual merit were exempt from the sale. These items were consigned to be part of the collection of a museum, which had been planned at the time of the sale of the palace furnishings.

In 1793, Charles-François Delacroix deputy to the convention and father of the painter Eugène Delacroix proposed that the metal statuary in the gardens of Versailles be confiscated and sent to the foundry to be made into cannon. The proposal was debated but eventually it was tabled. On 28 floréal an II (5 May 1794) the Convention decreed that the palace and gardens of Versailles, as well as other former royal residences in the environs, would not be sold but placed under the care of the Republic for the public good. Following this decree, the palace became a repository for art work seized from churches and princely homes. As a result of Versailles serving as a repository for confiscated art works, collections were amassed that eventually became part of the proposed museum.

Among the items found at Versailles at this time a collection of natural curiosities that has been assembled by the sieur de Fayolle during his voyages in America. The collection was sold to the Count of Artois and was later confiscated by the state. Fayolle, who had been nominated to the Commission des arts, became guardian of the collection and was later, in June 1794, nominated by the convention to be the first directeur du Conservatoire du Muséum national de Versailles. The next year, André Dumont the people's representative, became administrator for the department of the Seine-et-Oise. Upon assuming his administrative duties, Dumont was struck with the deplorable state into which the palace and gardens had sunk. He quickly assumed administrative duties of the palace and assembled a team of conservators to oversee the various collections of the museum.

One of Dumont's first appointments was that of Huges Lagarde (10 messidor an III (28 June 1795), a wealthy soap merchant from Marseille with strong political connections, as bibliographer of the museum. With the abandonment of the palace, there remained no less than 104 libraries which contained in excess of 200,000 printed volumes and manuscripts. Lagarde, with his political connections and his association with Dumont, became the driving force behind Versailles as a museum at this time. Lagarde was able to assemble a team of curators including sieur de Fayolle for natural history and, Louis Jean-Jacques Durameau, the painter responsible for the ceiling painting in the Opera, was appointed as curator for painting.

Owing largely to political vicissitudes that occurred in France during the 1790s, Versailles succumbed to further degradations. Mirrors were assigned by the finance ministry for payment of debts of the Republic and draperies, upholstery, and fringes were confiscated and sent to the mint to recoup the gold and silver used in their manufacture. Despite its designation as a museum, Versailles served as an annex to the Hôtel des Invalides pursuant to the decree of 7 frimaire an VIII (28 November 1799), which commandeered part of the palace and which had wounded soldiers being housed in the petit appartement du roi.

In 1797, the Muséum national was reorganised and renamed Musée spécial de l'École française. The grands appartements were used as galleries in which the morceaux de réception submitted by artists seeking admission to the Académie royale de peinture et de sculpture during the 17th and 18th centuries, the series The Life of Saint Bruno by Eustache Le Sueur and the Marie de' Medici cycle by Peter Paul Rubens were placed on display. The museum, which included the sculptures in the garden, became the finest museum of classic French art that had existed.

== First Empire ==
With the advent of Napoleon and the First Empire, the status of Versailles changed. Paintings and art work that had previously been assigned to Muséum national and the Musée spécial de l'École française were systematically dispersed to other locations, and eventually the museum was closed. In accordance with provisions of the 1804 Constitution, Versailles was designated as an imperial palace for the department of the Seine-et-Oise.

While Napoleon did not reside in the palace, apartments were, however, arranged and decorated for the use of the Empress Marie Louise. The Emperor chose to reside at the Grand Trianon. The palace continued to serve, however, as an annex of the Hôtel des Invalides Nevertheless, on 3 January 1805, Pope Pius VII, who came to France to officiate at Napoleon's coronation, visited the palace and blessed the throng of people gathered on the parterre d'eau from the balcony of the Hall of Mirrors.

== Bourbon Restoration ==
The Bourbon Restoration saw little activity at Versailles. Areas of the gardens were replanted but no significant restoration and modifications of the interiors were undertaken, despite the fact that Louis XVIII would often visit the palace and walk through the vacant rooms. Charles X chose the Tuileries Palace over Versailles and rarely visited his former home.

== July Monarchy ==
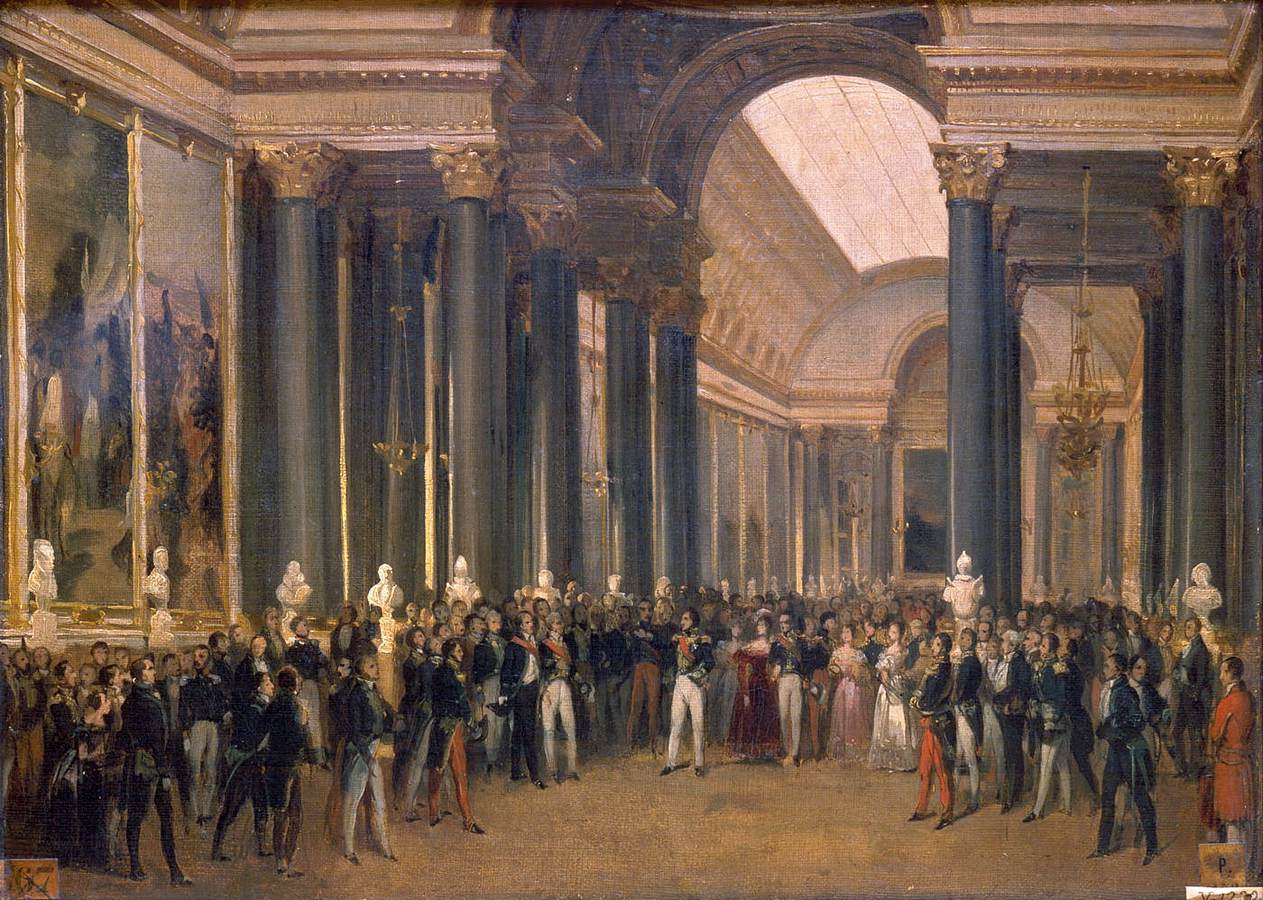
Louis-Philippe opening the Galerie des Batailles, 10 June 1837 (painted by François-Joseph Heim)

With the July Revolution of 1830 and the establishment of the July Monarchy, the status of Versailles changed. In March 1832, the Loi de la Liste civile was promulgated, which designated Versailles as a crown dependency. Like Napoleon before him, Louis-Philippe I chose to live at the Grand Trianon; however, unlike Napoleon, Louis-Philippe did have a grand design for Versailles.

In 1833, Louis-Philippe proposed the establishment of a museum dedicated to "all the glories of France", which included the Orléans dynasty and the Revolution of 1830 that put Louis-Philippe on the throne of France. For the next decade, under the direction of Frédéric Nepveu and Pierre-François-Léonard Fontaine, the château underwent irreversible alterations. The museum was officially inaugurated on 10 June 1837 as part of the festivities that surrounded the marriage of the Prince royal, Ferdinand-Philippe d'Orléans with princess Hélène of Mecklenburg-Schwerin and represented one of the most ambitious and costly undertakings of Louis-Philippe's reign.

Later, Honoré de Balzac characterised the effort in less laudatory terms as the "hospital of the glories of France".

The southern wing (Aile du Midi) was given over to the Galerie des Batailles (Hall of Battles), which necessitated the demolition of most of the apartments of the Princes of the Blood who lived in this part of the palace during the Ancien Régime. The Galerie des Batailles was modeled on the Grande Galerie of the Louvre Palace and was intended to glorify French military history from the Battle of Tolbiac (traditionally dated 495) to the Battle of Wagram (5–6 July 1809). While a number of the paintings were of questionable quality, a few were masterpieces, such as the Battle of Taillebourg by Eugène Delacroix. Part of the northern wing (Aile du Nord) was converted to the Salle des Croisades, a room dedicated to famous knights of the Crusades and decorated with their names and coats of arms. The apartments of the dauphin and the dauphine as well as those of Louis XV's daughters on the ground floor of the corps de logis were transformed into portrait galleries. To accommodate the displays, some of the boiseries were removed and either put into storage or sold. During the Prussian occupation of the palace in 1871, the boiseries in storage were burned as firewood.

== Second Empire & the start of the Third Republic ==
During the Second Empire, the museum remained essentially intact. The palace did serve as the backdrop for a number of state events including the visit by Queen Victoria.

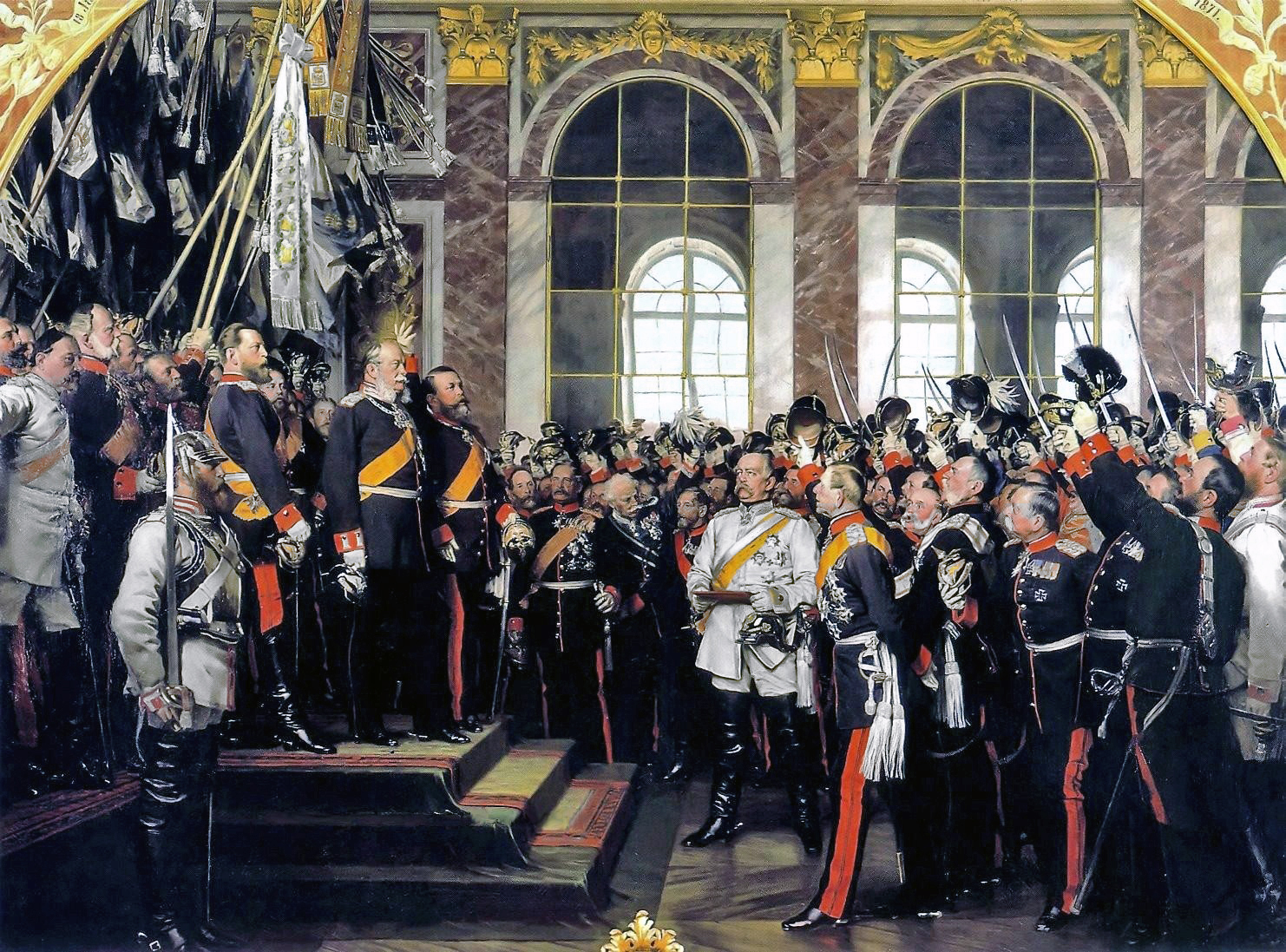
Proclamation of Wilhelm I as German Emperor in the Hall of Mirrors (painting by Anton von Werner)

The palace was the site of seminal events in French and European history during the Franco-Prussian War (1870-1871) and the subsequent birth of the French Third Republic. During the Franco-Prussian War, the town of Versailles was occupied by invading German troops and became the headquarters of the German General Staff. The Hall of Mirrors and the ground floor galleries were turned into a field hospital for injured German soldiers. It was in the Hall of Mirrors that Wilhelm I was declared German Emperor on 18 January 1871, before a crowd of officers and German princes. The symbolism of an enemy Prussian being crowned at Versailles, in a room whose ceiling depicts Louis XIV's victories against the Germans, was a source of bitter humiliation for the French.

When the Paris Commune erupted in the aftermath of the war (March 1871), the newly-formed National Assembly and its executive Adolphe Thiers evacuated Paris for Versailles. The deputies slept in the Hall of Mirrors and held their sessions in the Royal Opera house. For warmth, they burnt wood paneling that was in storage.

After the Commune was suppressed, the Versailles Opera was the seat of the National Assembly until the Third Republic was definitively established in 1875. At that time, it was decided that the Senate should remain in the Opera, while a new assembly room was commissioned to house the National Assembly. It was designed by Edmond de Joly and built within the central court of the South Wing. The Assemblée nationale, as the room became known, was inaugurated on 6 March 1876, and would host the National Assembly until they returned to the Palais Bourbon in 1879. The same year the Senate too returned to Paris, relocating to the Palace of Luxembourg. Until 1958, every President of France was elected by the two chambers assembled for the purpose in the Assemblée nationale auditorium at Versailles.

== Versailles under Pierre de Nolhac ==
Pierre de Nolhac arrived at the Palace of Versailles in 1887 and was appointed curator of the museum 18 November 1892. Upon his arrival, he planned to re-introduce historical galleries, organized scientifically, in contrast to the approach of Louis-Philippe, who had created the first galleries in a manner aimed at glorifying the history of France. At the same time, Nolhac began to restore the palace to its appearance before the Revolution. To achieve these two goals, Nolhac removed rooms, took down the artworks and gave the rooms some historical scenery. He explained in his memoirs, for example that "the first room sacrificed was that of the kings of France which had walls lined with effigies, real and imaginary, of our kings since Clovis". The changes wrought by Nolhac produced a new awareness of the castle. Members of high society and nobility, such as Henri d'Orléans, Duke of Aumale and the former Empress Eugénie flocked to see new developments. Nolhac also working to bring in foreign personalities. On 8 October 1896, Nicholas II of Russia and his wife Alexandra, arrived at Versailles. Nolhac also organized events aimed at raising the awareness of potential donors to the palace. The owner of the New York Herald, James Gordon Bennett, Jr., gave 25,000 francs for restructuring the 18th-century rooms. The development of private donations led to the creation of the Friends of Versailles in June 1907.

== Interwar period ==
Pierre de Nolhac resigned his long held position as Curator of Versailles in 1920; his colleague André Pératé assumed the head role and oversaw the palace for the next 13 years. By the early 1920s, years of accumulating neglect had taken a serious toll on the physical condition of the palace and gardens. Given the perilous financial state of the postwar French Third Republic, outside patronage became more essential than ever. In 1924, the American oil millionaire John D. Rockefeller was galvanized by a series of articles decrying the miserable state of repair at Versailles in the French magazine L'Illustration; Rockefeller wrote personally to the President of France, Raymond Poincaré, to offer financial support in restoring the palace. Between 1925 and 1928, the Rockefeller Foundation donated $2,166,000 towards the restoration of Versailles (roughly $30 million in 2014 USD). The money supported the repair of the palace roof, replacing the original slate with more durable lead. Repairs to the masonry and to the exterior woodwork were also undertaken and the Orangerie, the Théâtre de la Reine, the Minister's Wings, the Grove of the Domes and the Ballroom Grove were restored.

Rockefeller maintained a say into how the money was allocated by establishing the Franco-American Committee for the Restoration of Monuments, which had final approval over the restoration program. Its members were chosen by Rockefeller and appointed by Poincaré. Rockefeller's philanthropy also galvanized the National Assembly into increasing funding for the upkeep of Versailles. In 1924 it budgeted 4 million francs annually for the Palace of Versailles, which was increased to 5 million in 1932.

== The Van der Kemp period ==
Under the aegis of Gérald Van der Kemp, chief conservator of the museum from 1952 to 1980, the palace witnessed some of its most ambitious conservation and restoration projects: the Opera (completed in 1957); the Grand Trianon (1965); the Chambre de la Reine (1975); the Chambre de Louis XIV and the Hall of Mirrors (1980). At this time, the ground floor of the northern wing was converted into a gallery of French history from the 17th century to the 19th century. Additionally, at this time, policy was established in which the French government would aggressively seek to acquire as much of original furniture and artwork that had been dispersed at the time of the Revolution of 1789 as possible.

== Contemporary Versailles ==
With the past and ongoing restoration and conservation projects at Versailles, the Fifth Republic has enthusiastically promoted the museum as one of France's foremost tourist attractions. The palace, however, still serves political functions. Heads of state are regaled in the Hall of Mirrors; the Senate and the National Assembly meet in congress at Versailles to revise or otherwise amend the French Constitution, a tradition that came into effect with the promulgation of the 1875 Constitution. The Public Establishment of the Palace, Museum and National Estate of Versailles was created in 1995.

Château de Versailles Spectacles organised the Jeff Koons Versailles exhibition, held from 9 October 2008 to 4 January 2009. Jeff Koons said that "I hope the juxtaposition of today's surfaces, represented by my work, with the architecture and fine arts of Versailles will be an exciting interaction for the viewer." Elena Geuna and Laurent Le Bon, curators of the exhibition present it as follow: "It is the city aspect that underlies this entire venture. In recent years, many a cultural institution has attempted a confrontation between a heritage setting and contemporary works. The originality of this exhibition seems to us somewhat different, as regards both the chosen venue and the way it has been laid out. Echo, dialectic, opposition, counterpoint... Not for us to judge!"

The bronze equestrian statue of Louis XIV (Statue équestre de Louis XIV), a sculpture created by both Pierre Cartellier (1757–1831) and Louis Petitot (1794–1862) and completed in 1836, was restored in 2009. On April 27, 2009, the statue, having previously been situated in the courtyard (Cour d'Honneur), was placed outside the gates on the Place d'Armes (intersection of Avenue Rockefeller and Avenue de Paris).

On June 17, 2026, US President Donald Trump and Iranian President Masoud Pezeshkian signed the memorandum of understanding to end the 2026 Iran war, with Trump signing the document during dinner with French President Emmanuel Macron at the Palace of Versailles after the G7 summit.

== Bibliography ==
- Ayers, Andrew (2004). The Architecture of Paris. Stuttgart; London: Edition Axel Menges. ISBN 9783930698967.
- Balzac, Honoré de (1853). La comédie humaine, vol. 12. Paris: Pilet.
- Batiffol, Louis (1913). "Le château de Versailles de Louis XIII et son architecte Philibert le Roy" Gazette des Beaux-Arts, 4th edition, vol. 10 (November 1913), pp. 341–371 (at Gallica).
- Benichou, Paul (1948). Morales du grand siècle. Paris: Éditions Gallimard. OCLC 259119.
- Berger, Robert W. (1985a). In the Garden of the Sun King: Studies on the Park of Versailles Under Louis XIV. Washington, DC: Dumbarton Oaks Research Library. ISBN 9780884021414.
- Berger, Robert W. (1985b). Versailles: The Château of Louis XIV. University Park: The College Arts Association. ISBN 9780271004129.
- Berger, Robert W. (2008). Diplomatic Tours in the Gardens of Versailles Under Louis XIV. Philadelphia: University of Pennsylvania Press. ISBN 9780812241075.
- Bendix, Reinhard (1986). Kings or People: Power and the Mandate to Rule. Los Angeles: University of California Press. ISBN 9780520023024.
- Bluche, François (1986). Louis XIV. Paris: Arthème Fayard. ISBN 9782213015682.
- Bluche, François (1990). Dictionnaire du Grand Siècle. Paris: Arthème Fayard. ISBN 9782213024257.
- Castelot, André (1988). Charles X: La fin d'un monde. Paris: Perrin. ISBN 9782262005450.
- Constans, Claire (1985). "1837: L'inauguration par Louis-Philippe du musée dédié 'À Toutes les gloires de la France", Colloque Versailles. OCLC 12904910, 761465041.
- Constans, Claire (1987) . "Encadrement et muséographie: l'example du Versailles de Louis-Philippe", Revue de l'Art, vol. 76, pp. 53–56. doi:10.3406/rvart.1987.347630.
- Constans, Claire (1998). Versailles: Absolutism and Harmony. New York: The Vendome Press. ISBN 9782702811252.
- Da Vinha, Mathieu; Masson, Raphaël (2011). Versailles pour les nuls. Paris: Editions Générales First. ISBN 9782754015523.
- Dutilleux, Adolphe (1887). Notice sur le Museum national et le musée spécial de l'École française à Versailles (1792–1823). Versailles: Impr. de Cerf et fils. OCLC 457476198.
- Félibien, Jean-François (1703). Description sommaire de Versailles ancienne et nouvelle. Paris: A. Chrétien. Copy at INHA.
- Fromageot, Paul-Henri (1903). "Le Château de Versailles en 1795, d'après le journal de Hugues Lagarde", Revue de l'histoire de Versailles, pp. 224–240 (at the Internet Archive).
- Garrigues, Dominique (2001). Jardins et jardiniers de Versailles au grand siècle. Seyssel: Champ Vallon. ISBN 9782876733374.
- Gatin, L.-A. (1908). "Versailles pendant la Révolution", Revue de l'histoire de Versailles, pp. 226–253 and 333–352 at the Internet Archive.
- Guérard, Benjamin (1840). Collection des cartulaires de France. Tome I: Cartulaire de l'abbaye de Saint-Père de Chartres. Paris: Crapelet. Copy at Google Books.
- Hazlehurst, F. Hamilton (1980). Gardens of Illusion: The Genius of André Le Nostre. Nashville, Tennessee: Vanderbilt University Press. ISBN 9780826512093.
- Hoog, Simone (1996). "Versailles", vol. 32, pp. 369–374, in The Dictionary of Art, edited by Jane Turner. New York: Grove. ISBN 9781884446009. Also at Oxford Art Online (subscription required).
- Hugo, Victor (1972). Choses vues, 1830–1846, edited by Hubert Juin. Paris: Gallimard. ISBN 9782070360116.
- Johnson, Kevin Olin (1981). "Il n'y plus de Pyrénées: Iconography of the first Versailles of Louis XIV", Gazette des Beaux-Arts, 6th edition, vol. 97 (January), pp. 29–40.
- Lemoine, Pierre (1976). "La chambre de la Reine", La Revue du Louvre et des musées de France, vol. 26, no. 3, pp. 139–145. ISSN 0035-2608.
- Mansel, Philip. King of the World: The Life of Louis XIV (2020) chapters 8, 13.
- Mansel, Philip (1999). Louis XVIII (revised, in English). Stroud: Sutton. ISBN 9780750922173 (paperback).
- Marie, Alfred (1968). Naissance de Versailles. Paris: Édition Vincent, Freal & Cie. OCLC 3731196.
- Marie, Alfred; Marie, Jeanne (1972). Mansart à Versailles. Paris: Editions Jacques Freal. OCLC 746666.
- Marie, Alfred; Marie, Jeanne (1976). Versailles au temps de Louis XIV. Paris: Imprimérie Nationale. OCLC 311957302.
- Marie, Alfred; Marie, Jeanne (1984). Versailles au temps de Louis XV. Paris: Imprimérie Nationale. ISBN 9782110808004.
- Mauguin, Georges (1937). "L'Inauguration du Musée de Versailles", Revue de l'histoire de Versailles (July 1937), pp. 112–146 (at Gallica).
- Mauguin, Georges (1940–1942). "La visite du Pape Pie VII à Versailles le 3 janvier 1805", Revue de l'histoire de Versailles (July 1940 – December 1942), pp. 134–146 (at Gallica).
- Meyer, Daniel (1985). "Un achat manqué par le musée de Versailles en 1852", Colloque Versailles. OCLC 12904910, 761465041.
- Nagel, Susan (2009.) Marie-Therese: The Fate of Marie Antoinette's Daughter. London: Bloomsbury. ISBN 9780747581598.
- Nolhac, Pierre de (1898). Le Chateau de Versailles sous Louis Quinze. Paris: H. Champion. OCLC 894269761. Copy at HathiTrust.
- Nolhac, Pierre de (1899). "La construction de Versailles de Le Vau", Revue de l'Histoire de Versailles, pp. 161–171 (at Gallica).
- Nolhac, Pierre de (1901). La création de Versailles. Versailles: L. Bernard. OCLC 8151727.
- Nolhac, Pierre de (1911). Histoire du Château de Versailles. Versailles Sous Louis XIV. (2 volumes). Paris: André Marty. OCLC 817037275. Vol. 2 at HathiTrust.
- Nolhac, Pierre de (1918). Histoire du Château de Versailles. Versailles au VIIIe siècle. Paris: Émile-Paul Frères. OCLC 897084052. Copy at Google Books.
- Oppermann, Fabien (2004). Images et usages du château de Versailles au XXe siècle (thesis/dissertation). Paris: École des Chartes.
- Pérouse de Montclos, Jean-Marie (1991). Versailles, translated from the French by John Goodman. New York: Abbeville Press Publishers. ISBN 9781558592285.
- Pradel, Pierre (1937). "Versailles sous le premier Empire", Revue de l'histoire de Versailles, pp. 76–94 (at Gallica).
- Solnon, Jean François (1987). La cour de France. Paris: Fayard. ISBN 9782213020150.
- Spawforth, Tony (2008). Versailles: A Biography of a Palace, first edition. New York: St. Martin's Press. ISBN 9780312357856.
- Thompson, Ian (2006). The Sun King's Garden. London: Bloomsbury. ISBN 9781582346311.
- Van der Kemp, Gérald (1976). "Remeubler Versailles", La Revue du Louvre et des musées de France, vol. 26, no. 3, pp. 135–137. ISSN 0035-2608.
- Verlet, Pierre (1945). Le mobilier royal français. Paris: Editions d'art et d'histoire. OCLC 742722112.
- Verlet, Pierre (1985). Le château de Versailles (revised and updated from the 1961 edition). Paris: Librairie Arthème Fayard. ISBN 9782213016009.
- Walton, Guy (1986). Louis XIV's Versailles. London: Penguin Books. ISBN 0670801941.
