= Pierre de Nyert =

French opera singer (1597–1682)

Pierre de Nyert (1597 in Bayonne – 1682 in Paris) was a 17th-century French opera singer.

== Biography ==
First valet de chambre of Louis XIII and Louis XIV, Pierre de Nyert was sent to Rome in 1633 to perfect his vocal education. He borrowed from the Italians the respect of natural prosody, good diction and the enhancement of the lyrics, but according to the French taste, he made good use of the art of embroidery while keeping a fair and refined declamation.

Among his pupils were Michel Lambert, Anne Chabanceau de La Barre, Mlle Hilaire and, probably also, Bénigne de Bacilly.

Pierre de Nyert was an interior valet, a title that actually covered several charges, relaying information and sometimes rumor, serving those who had the misfortune of displeasing them.

== Bibliography ==
- Mathieu da Vinha, Les Valets de chambre de Louis XIV, Paris, Perrin, coll. "Pour l'Histoire", 2004, passim.
- Mathieu da Vinha, Les Nyert, exemple d’une ascension sociale dans la Maison du Roi au XVIIe siècle, XVIIe siècle, 54th year, 2002–1, (pp. 15–34).
