= Grand appartement du roi =

King's grand apartments in the Palace of Versailles

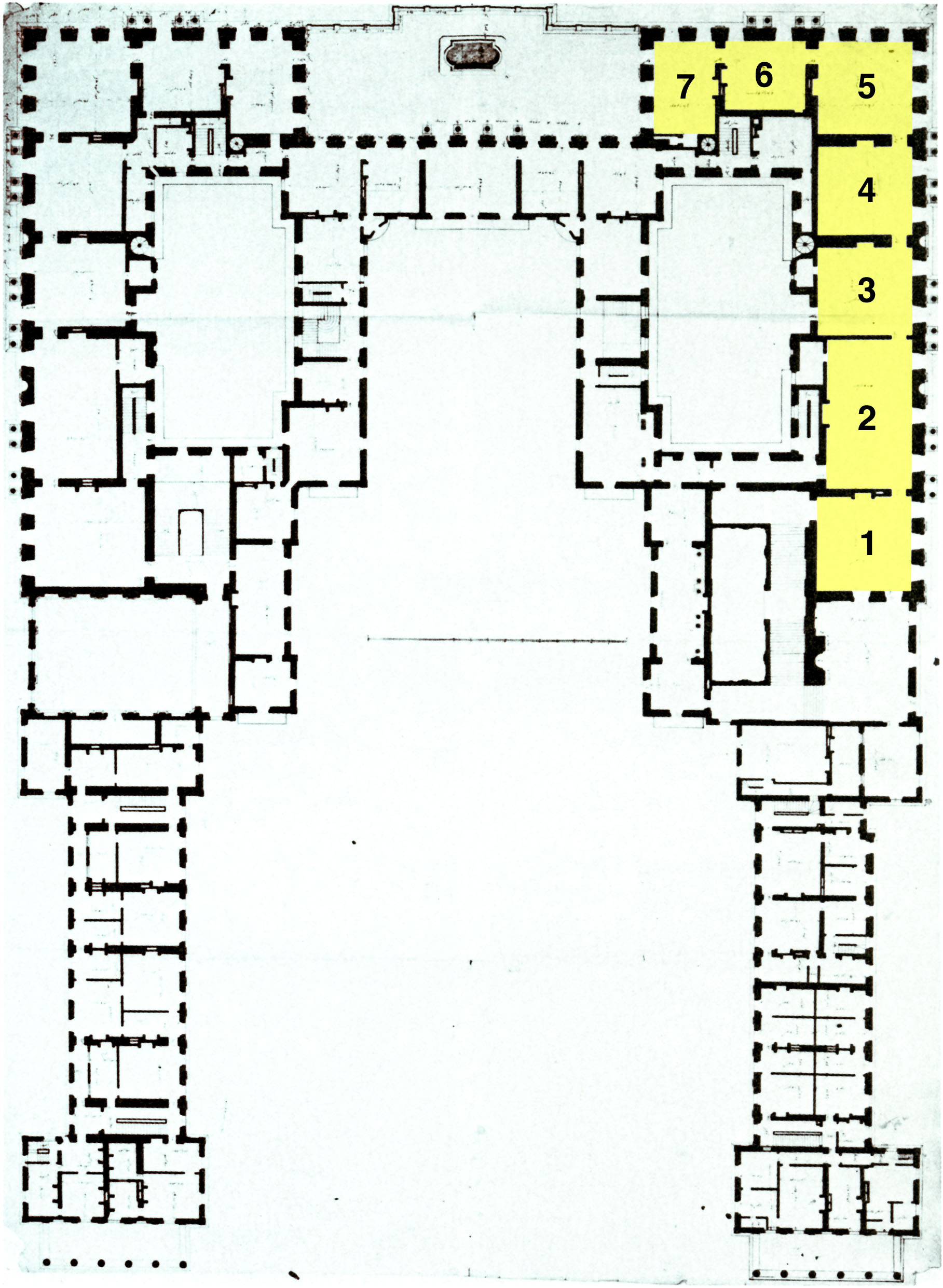
Plan of Versailles before the third building campaign, with the King's grand apartment in yellow

The grand appartement du roi is the King's grand apartment of the Palace of Versailles.

As a result of Louis Le Vau's envelope of Louis XIII’s château, constructed as part of Louis XIV's second building campaign (1669–1672), the King and Queen had new apartments in the new addition, known at the time as the château neuf (new palace). The State Apartments, which are known respectively as the grand appartement du roi and the grand appartement de la reine, occupied the main or principal floor of the château neuf. Le Vau's design for the state apartments closely followed Italian models of the day, as evidenced by the placement of the apartments on the next floor up from the ground level – the piano nobile – a convention the architect borrowed from 16th- and 17th-century Italian palace design.

Le Vau's plan called for an enfilade of seven rooms, each dedicated to one of the then-known planets and their associated titular Roman deity. Le Vau's plan was bold as he designed a heliocentric system that centered on the salon d’Apollon. The salon d’Apollon originally was designed as the King's bedchamber, but served as a throne room. The original arrangement of the enfilade of rooms was thus:

1. Salon de Diane (Diana, Roman goddess of the hunt; associated with the Moon)
2. Salon de Mars (Mars, Roman god of war; associated with the planet Mars)
3. Salon de Mercure (Mercury, Roman god of trade, commerce, and the Liberal Arts; associated with the planet Mercury)
4. Salon d'Apollon (Apollo, Roman god of the Fine Arts; associated with the Sun)
5. Salon de Jupiter (Jupiter, Roman god of law and order; associated with the planet Jupiter)
6. Salon de Saturne (Saturn, Roman god of agriculture and harvest)
7. Salon de Vénus (Venus, Roman goddess of love; associated with the planet Venus)

The configuration of the grand appartement du roi conformed to contemporary conventions in palace design. However, owing to Louis XIV's personal tastes the grand appartement du roi was reserved for court functions — such as the thrice-weekly appartement evenings given by Louis XIV.

The rooms were decorated by Charles Le Brun and demonstrated Italian influences (Le Brun met and studied with the famed Tuscan artist Pietro da Cortona, whose decorative style of the Palazzo Pitti in Florence Le Brun adapted for use at Versailles). The quadratura style of the ceilings evoke Cortona's sale dei planeti at the Pitti, but Le Brun's decorative scheme is more complex. In his 1674 publication about the grand appartement du roi, André Félibien described the scenes depicted in the coves of the ceilings of the rooms as allegories depicting the “heroic actions of the king.” Accordingly, one finds scenes of the exploits of Augustus, Alexander the Great, and Cyrus the Great alluding to the deeds of Louis XIV. For example, in the salon d’Apollon, the cove painting “Augustus building the port of Misenum” alludes to the construction of the port at La Rochelle; or, depicted in the south cove of the salon de Mercure is “Ptolemy II Philadelphus in his Library”, which alludes to Ptolemy’s construction of the Great Library of Alexandria and which accordingly serves as an allegory to Louis XIV’s expansion of the Bibliothèque du roi. Complementing the rooms’ decors were pieces of massive silver furniture. Regrettably, owing to the War of the League of Augsburg, in 1689 Louis XIV ordered all of this silver furniture to be sent to the mint, to be melted down to help defray the cost of the war.

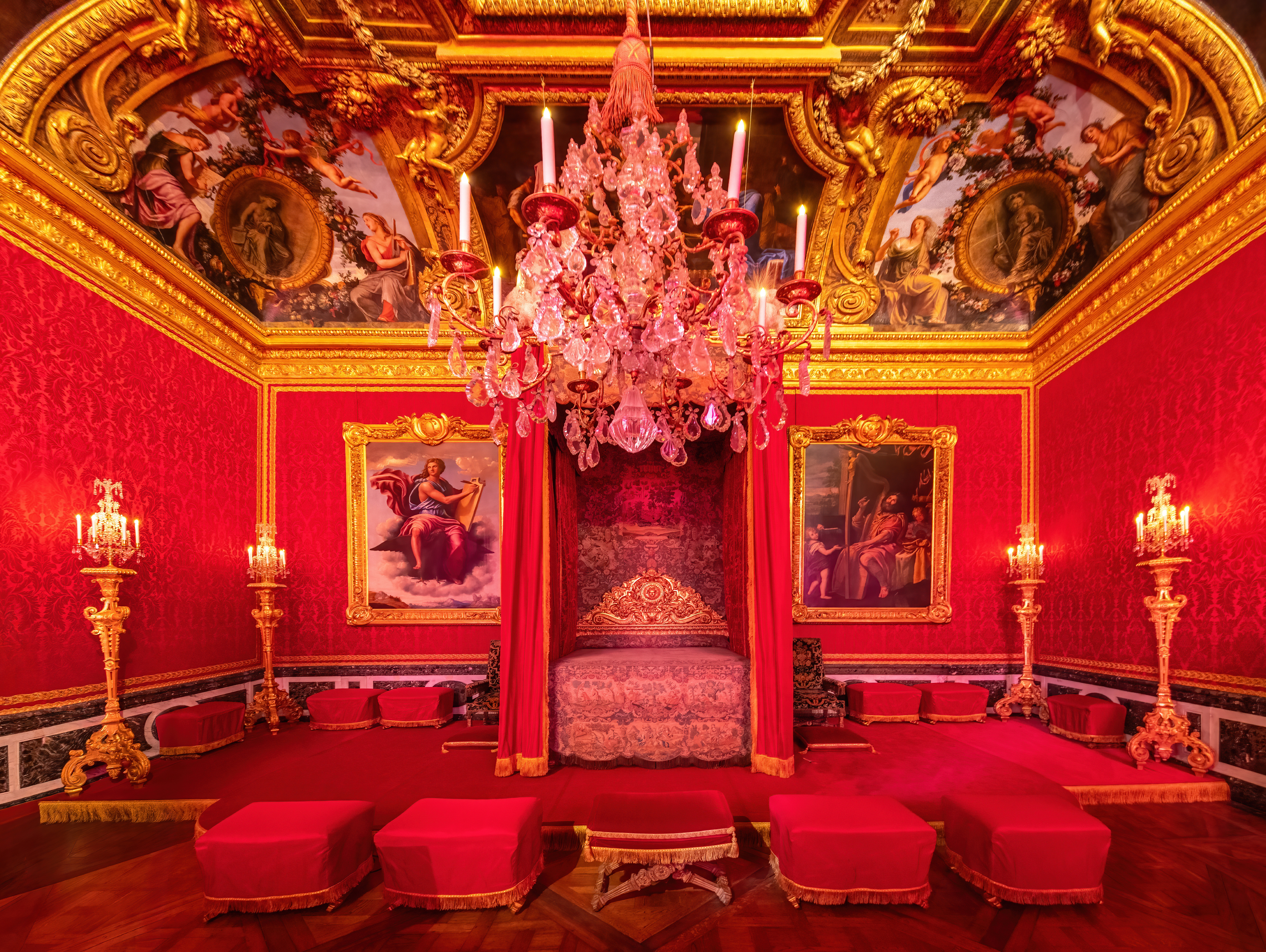
Lit de parade, Salon of Mercury. The clock, by Antoine Morand, was offered to Louis XIV in 1706. It is the only piece of furniture from the Grand Appartement that has survived, however the original Boulle marquetry case has been replaced.

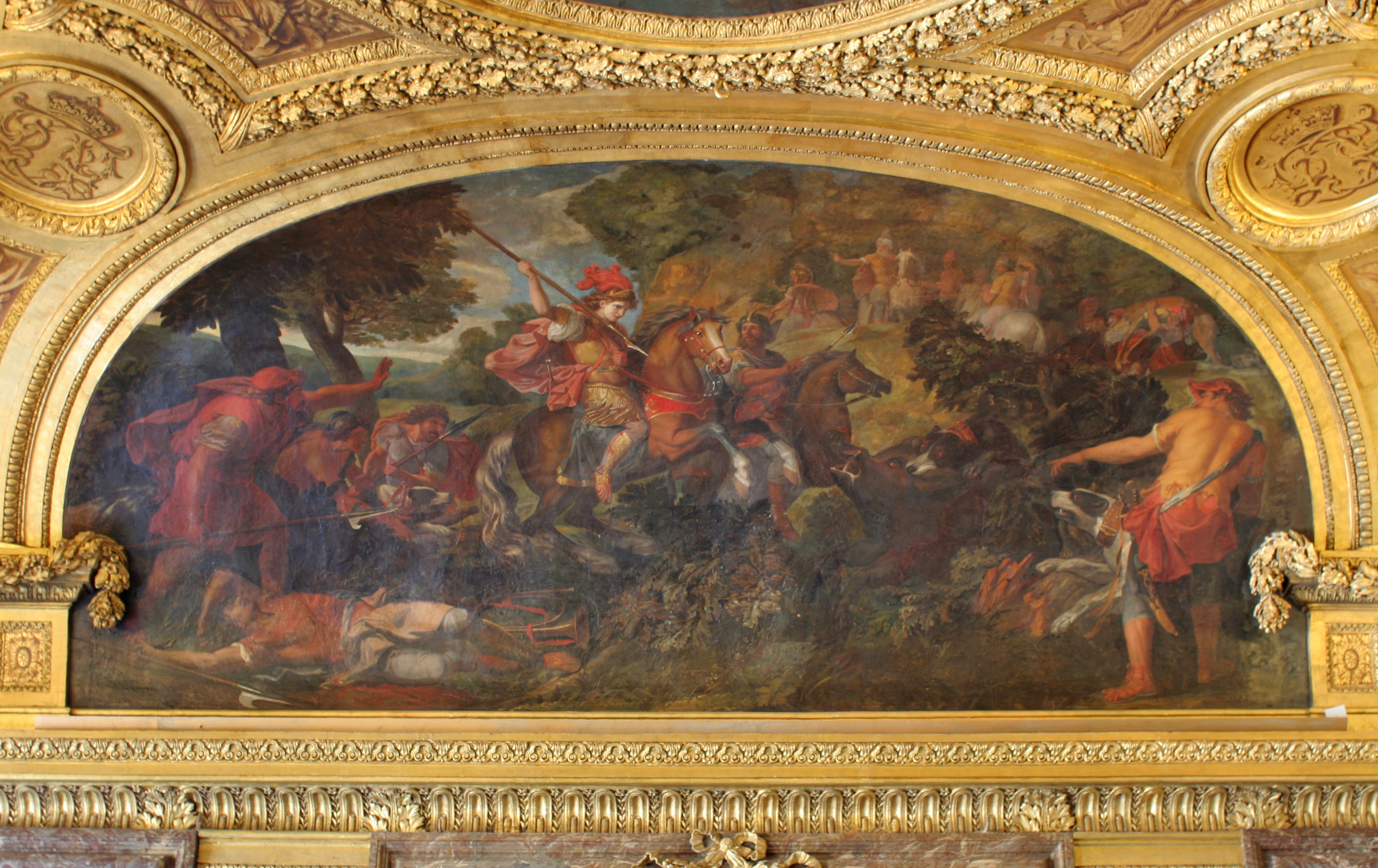
Painting of the Persian emperor Cyrus the Great hunting wild boar, by Claude Audran II, located in the Salon de Diane

LeVau's original plan for the grand appartement du roi was short-lived. With the inauguration of the third building campaign (1678–1684), which suppressed the terrace linking the king and queen's apartments and the salons of Jupiter, Saturn and Venus for the construction of the Hall of Mirrors, the configuration of the grand appartement du roi was altered. The decor of the salon de Jupiter was removed and reused in the decoration of the salle des gardes de la reine; and elements of the decoration of the first salon de Vénus, which opened onto the terrace, were reused in the salon de Vénus that we see today.

From 1678 to the end of Louis XIV's reign, the grand appartement du roi served as the venue for the King's thrice-weekly evening receptions, known as les soirées de l’appartement. For these parties, the rooms assumed specific functions:

- Salon de Vénus: buffet tables were arranged to display food and drink for the king's guests.
- Salon de Diane: served as a billiard room.
- Salon de Mars: served as a ballroom.
- Salon de Mercure: served as a gaming (cards) room.
- Salon d’Apollon: served as a concert or music room.

In the 18th century during the reign of Louis XV, the grand appartement du roi was expanded to include the salon de l’Abondance — formerly the entry vestibule of the petit appartement du roi — and the salon d’Hercule — occupying the tribune level of the former chapel of the château.

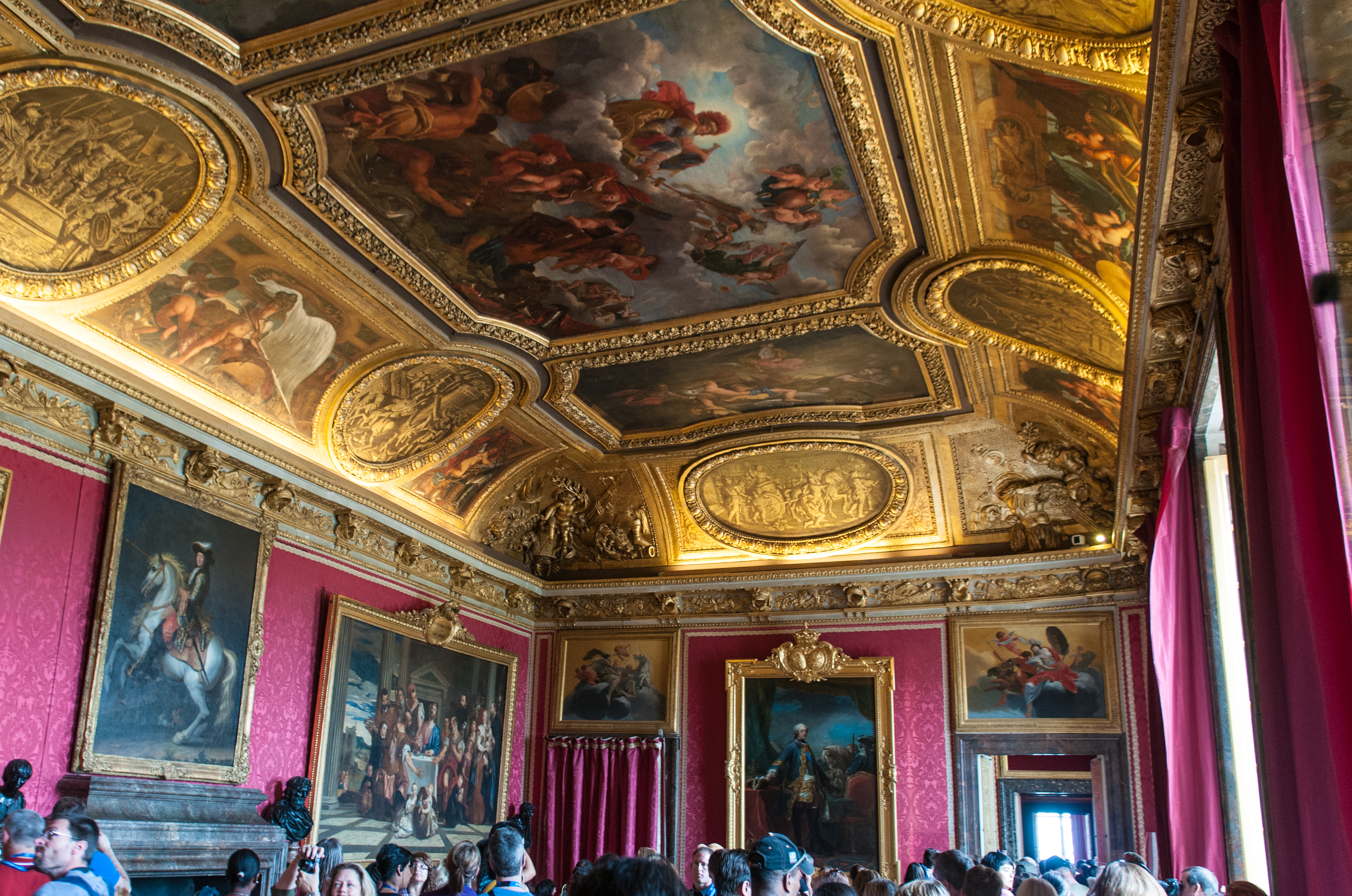
Salon de Mars

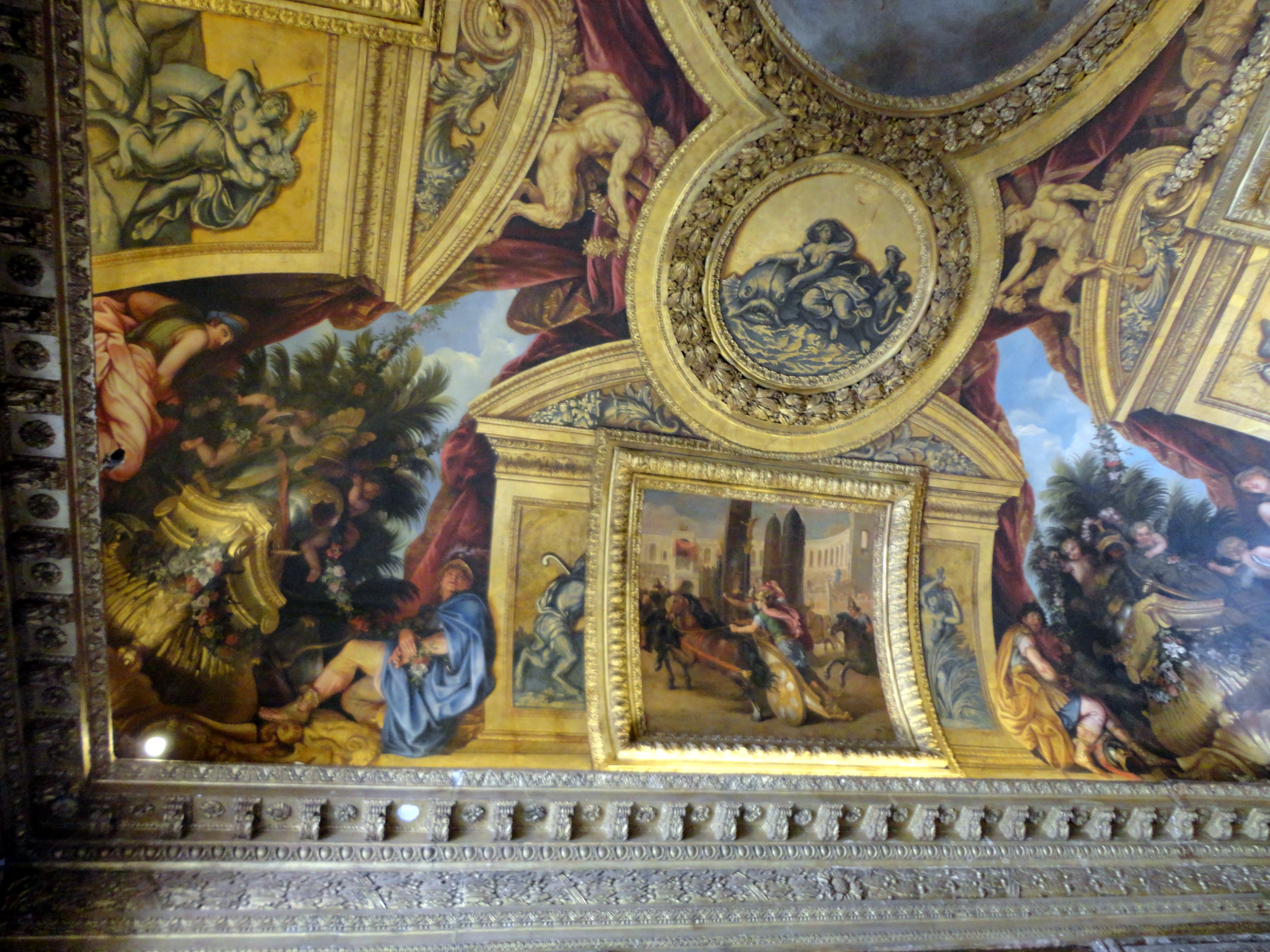
Ceiling in the Salon de Vénus

== Bibliography ==
Primary source

- Félibien, André (1694). La description du chateau de Versailles, de ses peintures, et d'autres ouvrages fait pour le roy. Paris: Antoine Vilette. OCLC 14959654.
- Félibien, Jean-François (1703). Description sommaire de Versailles ancienne et nouvelle. Paris: A. Chrétien. OCLC 186796049.
- Monicart, Jean-Baptiste de (1720). Versailles immortalisé par les merveilles parlantes des bâtimens, jardins, bosquets, parcs, statues et vases de marbre qui sont dans les châteaux de Versailles, de Trianon, de la Ménagerie et de Marly. Paris: E. Ganeau. OCLC 563933157.

Secondary source

- Campbell, Malcolm (1977). Pietro da Cortona at the Pitti Palace. Princeton: Princeton University Press. ISBN 9780691038919. OCLC 993316809.
- Lighthart, E. (1997). Archétype et symbole dans le style Louis XIV versaillais: réflexions sur l'imago rex et l'imago patriae au début de l'époque moderne. Doctoral thesis.
- Marie, Alfred and Jeanne (1972). Mansart à Versailles. Paris: Editions Jacques Freal. OCLC 889332274.
  - Marie, Alfred and Jeanne (1976). Versailles au temps de Louis XIV: Mansart et Robert de Cotte. Paris: Imprimerie Nationale. OCLC 837387303.
  - Marie, Alfred (1968). Naissance de Versailles. Paris: Edition Vincent, Freal & Cie. OCLC 640147659.
- Nolhac, Pierre de (1901). La création de Versailles d'après les sources inédites étude sur les origines et les premières transformations du château et des jardins. Versailles: L. Bernard. OCLC 265027101.
  - Nolhac, Pierre de (1925). Versailles; résidence de Louis XIV. Paris: Louis Conard. OCLC 21028820.
- Verlet, Pierre (1985). Le Chateau de Versailles sous Louis XV : recherches sur l'histoire de la cour et sur les travaux des batiments du roi. Paris: Librairie Arthème Fayard. OCLC 8001418.

Journal articles

- Baillie, Hugh Murray (1967). "Etiquette and the Planning of State Apartments in Baroque Palaces". Archaeologia. 101: 169–199. doi:10.1017/s0261340900013813.
- Constans, Claire (1976). "Les tableaux du Grand Appartement du Roi". Revue du Louvre. 3: 157–173.
- Josephson, Ragnar (1926). "Relation de la visite de Nicodème Tessin à Marly, Versailles, Rueil, et St-Cloud en 1687". Revue de l'Histoire de Versailles: 150–67, 274–300.
- Kimball, Fiske (1946). "Unknown Versailles: The appartement du Roi, 1678-1701". Gazette des Beaux-Arts. 29 (6): 85–112.
  - Kimball, Fiske (1949). "Genesis of the Château Neuf at Versailles, 1668-1671". Gazette des Beaux-Arts. 35 (6): 353–372. doi:10.1080/00043079.1940.11409005.
- Le Guillou, Jean-Claude (December 1983). "Le château-neuf ou enveloppe de Versailles: concept et evolution du premier projet". Gazette des Beaux-Arts. 102 (6): 193–207.
  - Le Guillou, Jean-Claude (July–August 1986). "Le Grand et le Petit Appartement de Louis XIV au château de Versailles". Gazette des Beaux-Arts. 108 (6): 7–22. doi:10.3406/bulmo.2008.2007.
- Nolhac, Pierre de (1899). "La construction de Versailles de Le Vau". Revue de l'Histoire de Versailles: 161–171.
