= Grand appartement de la reine =

Apartment in the Palace of Versailles, France

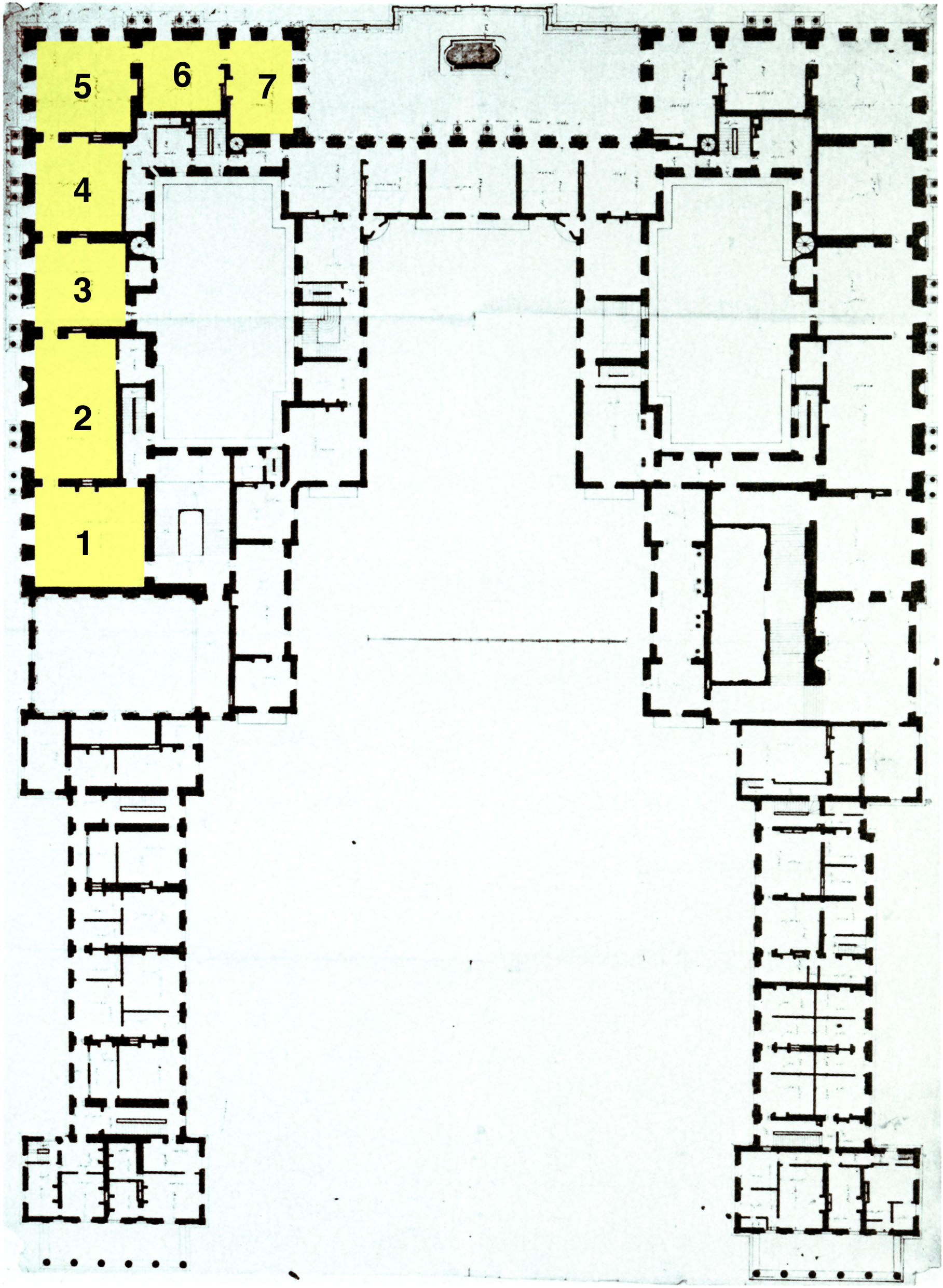
Plan of the Palace of Versailles c. 1676 (before the third building campaign), with the Queen's grand apartment marked in yellow

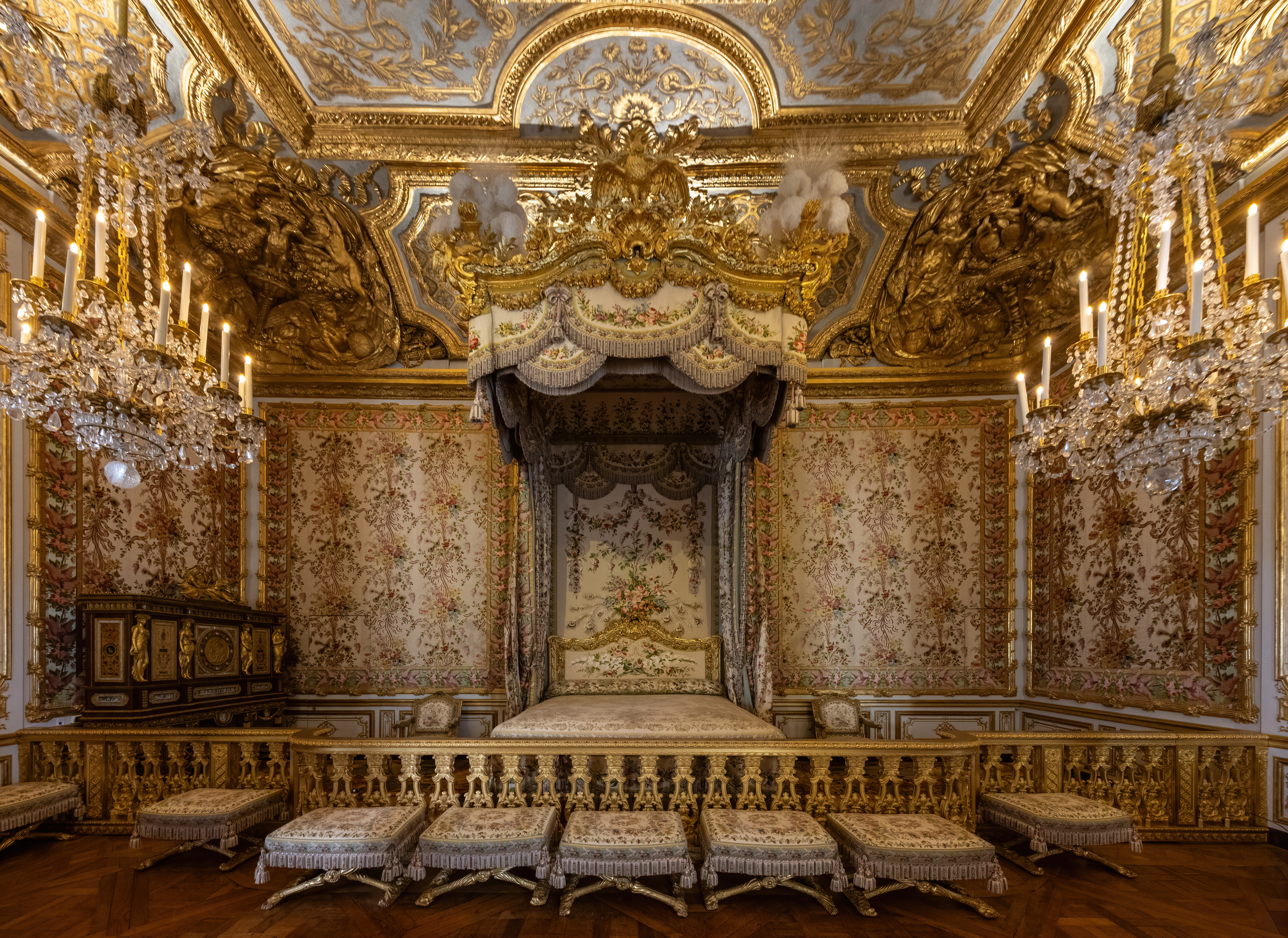
The Queen's bedchamber. There is a barely discernible hidden door in the corner near the jewel cabinet by Schwerdfeger (1787) through which Marie Antoinette escaped the night of 5/6 October 1789 when the Paris mob stormed Versailles.

The grand appartement de la reine is the Queen's grand apartment of the Palace of Versailles.

Forming a parallel enfilade with that of the grand appartement du roi, the grand appartement de la reine served as the residence of three Queens of France: Maria Theresa of Spain (wife of Louis XIV), Marie Leszczyńska (wife of Louis XV) and Marie Antoinette (wife of Louis XVI). Additionally, Louis XIV's granddaughter-in-law, Marie Adélaïde of Savoy, as duchess of Burgundy, occupied these rooms from 1697, the year of her marriage, to her death in 1712.

When Louis Le Vau's envelope of the château vieux (old palace) was completed, the grand appartement de la reine came to include a suite of seven enfilade rooms on the main floor in the left wing with an arrangement that mirrored almost exactly the grand appartement du roi in the right wing. The configuration was:

1. Chapel – corresponding to the salon de Diane in the King's grand apartment
2. Salle de gardes – corresponding to the salon de Mars in the King's grand apartment
3. Antichambre – corresponding to the salon de Mercure in the King's grand apartment
4. Chambre – corresponding to with the salon d’Apollon in the King's grand apartment
5. Grand cabinet – corresponding to the salon de Jupiter in the King's grand apartment
6. Oratory – corresponding to the salon de Saturne in the King's grand apartment
7. Petit cabinet – corresponding to the salon de Vénus in the King's grand apartment

As with the decoration of the ceiling in the grand appartement du roi, which depicted the heroic actions of Louis XIV as allegories from events taken from the antique past, the decoration of the grand appartement de la reine likewise depicted heroines from the antique past and harmonized with the general theme of a particular room's decor.

With the construction of the Hall of Mirrors, which began in 1678, the configuration of the grand appartement de la reine changed. The chapel was transformed into the salle des gardes de la reine and it was in this room that the decorations from the salon de Jupiter were reused. The salle des gardes de la reine communicates with a loggia that issues from the escalier de la reine (Queen's staircase), which corresponded (albeit a smaller, though similarly decorated example) to the escalier des ambassadeurs (Ambassador's Staircase) in the grand appartement du roi. The loggia also provides access to the appartement du roi, the suite of rooms in which Louis XIV lived. Toward the end of Louis XIV's reign, the escalier de la reine became the principal entrance to the château, with the escalier des ambassadeurs used on rare state occasions. After the destruction of the escalier des ambassadeurs in 1752, the escalier de la reine became the main entrance to the château.

From 1682, the grand appartement de la reine included:

- Salle des gardes de la reine
- Antichambre (formerly the salle des gardes)
- Grand cabinet
- Chambre de la reine

With the death of Louis XIV in 1715, the court moved to the Château de Vincennes and later to Paris. In 1722, Louis XV reinstalled the court at Versailles and began modifications to the château's interior. Among the most noteworthy of the building projects during Louis XV's reign, the redecoration of the chambre de la reine must be cited.

To commemorate the birth of his only son and heir, Louis, in 1729, Louis XV ordered a complete redecoration of the room. Elements of the chambre de la reine as it had been used by Marie-Thérèse and Marie-Adélaïde of Savoy were removed and a new, more modern decor was installed.

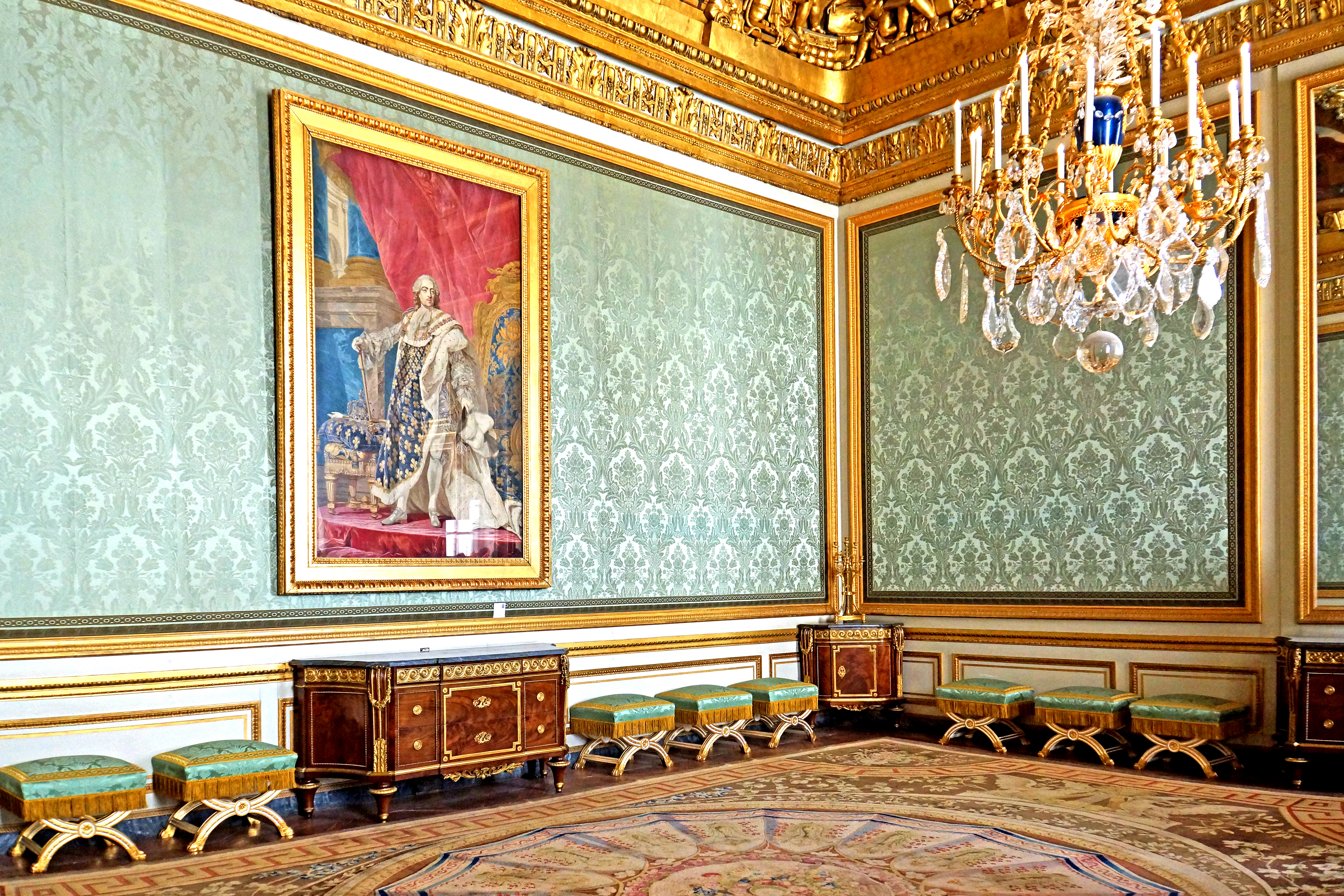
Queen's Salon des nobles as of 2014

During her life at Versailles, Marie Leszczynska (1703–1768) lived in the grand appartement de la reine, to which she annexed the salon de la paid to serve as a music room. In 1770, when the Austrian archduchess Marie Antoinette married the Dauphin, later Louis XVI, she took up residence in these rooms. Upon Louis XVI's ascension to the throne in 1774, Marie Antoinette ordered major redecoration of the grand appartement de la reine. At this time, the Queen's apartment achieved the arrangement that we see today.

- Salle des gardes de la reine – this room remained virtually unchanged by Marie Antoinette.
- Antichambre – this room was transformed into the antichambre du grand couvert. It was in this room that the King, Queen and other members of the royal family dined in public. Occasionally, this room served as a theatre for the château.
- Grand cabinet – this room was transformed into the Salon des nobles. Following the tradition established by her predecessor, Marie Antoinette would hold formal audiences in this room. When not used for formal audiences, the salon des nobles served as an antechamber to the Queen's bedroom.
- Chambre de la reine – this room was used as the Queen's bedroom and was of exceptional splendour. On the night of 6/7 October 1789, Marie Antoinette fled from the Paris mob by escaping through a private corridor that connected her apartment with that of the King.

== Bibliography ==
Primary source

- Félibien, André (1694). La description du chateau de Versailles, de ses peintures, et d'autres ouvrages fait pour le roy. Paris: Antoine Vilette. OCLC 14959654.
- Félibien, Jean-François (1703). Description sommaire de Versailles ancienne et nouvelle. Paris: A. Chrétien. OCLC 186796049.
- Monicart, Jean-Baptiste de (1720). Versailles immortalisé par les merveilles parlantes des bâtimens, jardins, bosquets, parcs, statues et vases de marbre qui sont dans les châteaux de Versailles, de Trianon, de la Ménagerie et de Marly. Paris: E. Ganeau. OCLC 563933157.

Secondary source

- Campbell, Malcolm (1977). Pietro da Cortona at the Pitti Palace. Princeton: Princeton University Press. ISBN 9780691038919. OCLC 993316809.
- Lighthart, E. (1997). Archétype et symbole dans le style Louis XIV versaillais: réflexions sur l'imago rex et l'imago patriae au début de l'époque moderne. Doctoral thesis.
- Marie, Alfred and Jeanne (1972). Mansart à Versailles. Paris: Editions Jacques Freal. OCLC 889332274.
  - Marie, Alfred and Jeanne (1976). Versailles au temps de Louis XIV: Mansart et Robert de Cotte. Paris: Imprimerie Nationale. OCLC 837387303.
  - Marie, Alfred (1968). Naissance de Versailles. Paris: Edition Vincent, Freal & Cie. OCLC 640147659.
- Nolhac, Pierre de (1901). La création de Versailles d'après les sources inédites étude sur les origines et les premières transformations du château et des jardins. Versailles: L. Bernard. OCLC 265027101.
  - Nolhac, Pierre de (1925). Versailles; résidence de Louis XIV. Paris: Louis Conard. OCLC 21028820.
- Verlet, Pierre (1985). Le Chateau de Versailles sous Louis XV : recherches sur l'histoire de la cour et sur les travaux des batiments du roi. Paris: Librairie Arthème Fayard. OCLC 8001418.

Journal articles

- Baillie, Hugh Murray (1967). "Etiquette and the Planning of State Apartments in Baroque Palaces". Archaeologia. 101: 169–199. doi:10.1017/s0261340900013813.
- Constans, Claire (1976). "Les tableaux du Grand Appartement du Roi". Revue du Louvre. 3: 157–173.
- Josephson, Ragnar (1926). "Relation de la visite de Nicodème Tessin à Marly, Versailles, Rueil, et St-Cloud en 1687". Revue de l'Histoire de Versailles: 150–67, 274–300.
- Kimball, Fiske (1946). "Unknown Versailles: The appartement du Roi, 1678-1701". Gazette des Beaux-Arts. 29 (6): 85–112.
  - Kimball, Fiske (1949). "Genesis of the Château Neuf at Versailles, 1668-1671". Gazette des Beaux-Arts. 35 (6): 353–372. doi:10.1080/00043079.1940.11409005.
- Le Guillou, Jean-Claude (December 1983). "Le château-neuf ou enveloppe de Versailles: concept et evolution du premier projet". Gazette des Beaux-Arts. 102 (6): 193–207.
  - Le Guillou, Jean-Claude (July–August 1986). "Le Grand et le Petit Appartement de Louis XIV au château de Versailles". Gazette des Beaux-Arts. 108 (6): 7–22. doi:10.3406/bulmo.2008.2007.
- Nolhac, Pierre de (1899). "La construction de Versailles de Le Vau". Revue de l'Histoire de Versailles: 161–171.
