= Bénigne de Bacilly =

French composer and music theorist (c. 1625–1690)

Bertrand "Bénigne" de Bacilly (Normandy c. 1625 - Paris, 27 September 1690), was a French composer and music theorist, a reformer of the air de cour according to the theories of Pierre de Nyert.

== Works, editions and recordings ==
- Collection Les Airs Spirituels editions published in 1672 and 1677, 1668
- Text Remarques curieuses sur l'art de bien chanter 1688

Recordings

- Bertrand de Bacilly ou l'art d'orner le "beau chant" Ensemble A deux voiles esgales. Saphir 2011
- De Bacilly - Claudine Ansermet, Paolo Cherici. Symphonia 2006
- Airs de Cour - René Jacobs. Harmonia Mundi 1999

== See also ==
- Henry Le Bailly
