= Mathieu da Vinha =

French historian (born 1976)

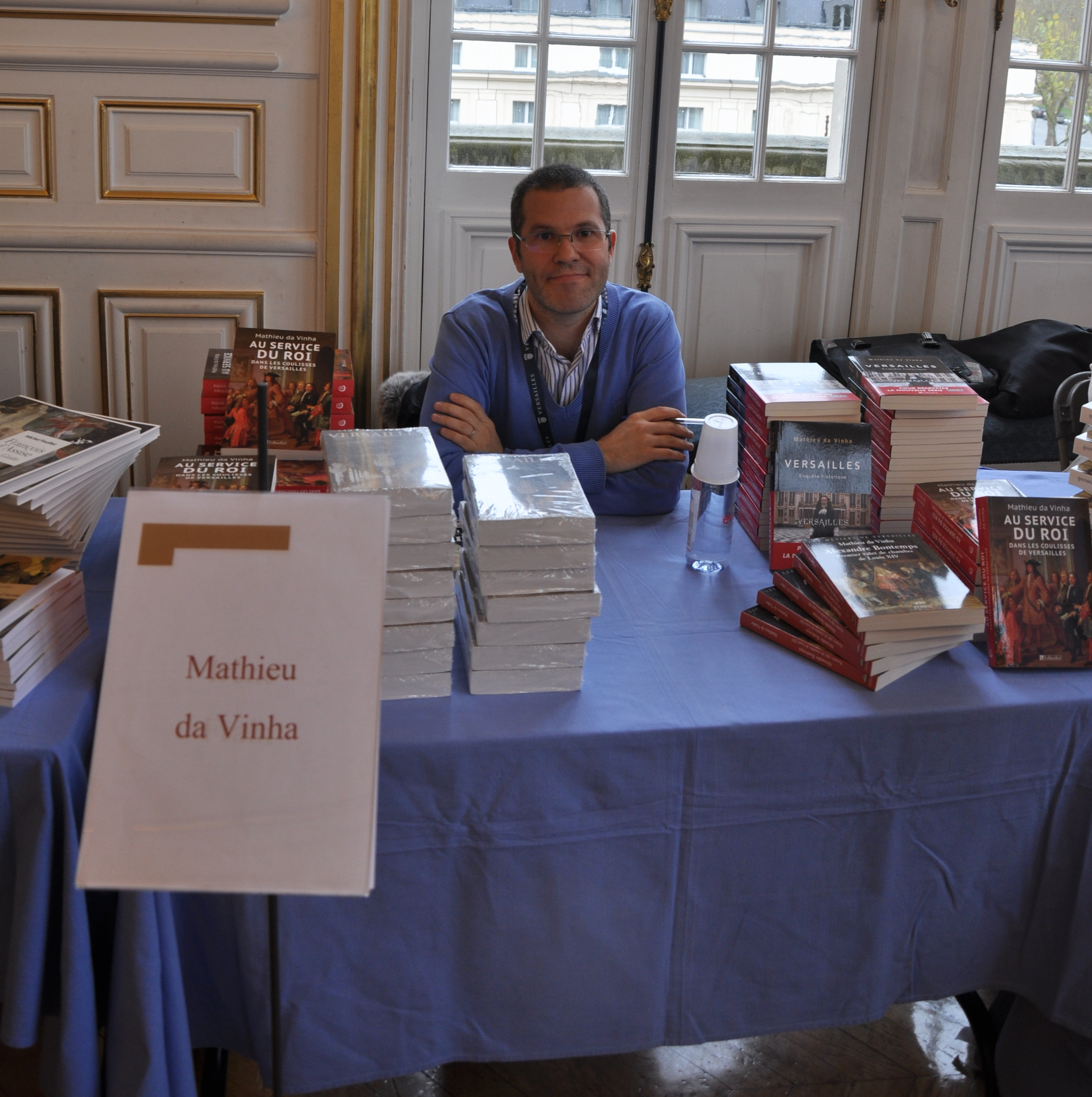

Mathieu da Vinha (born 15 March 1976) is a 21st-century French historian. He is the author of several studies or biographies relating to life under the reign of king Louis XIV. A research associate, he is the scientific director of the Palace of Versailles Research Centre.

== Career ==
Mathieu da Vinha was born in Argenteuil. After studying in Paris in Khâgne at the lycée Paul-Valéry then Cité scolaire internationale Honoré-de-Balzac, Mathieu da Vinha studied history at the Paris-Sorbonne University, where he obtained a doctorate in modern history in 2003. In 2006, he joined the corps of engineers of ancient sources, and the following year that of research engineers in source analysis.

He is currently the Scientific Director of the Palace of Versailles Research Centre.

Mathieu da Vinha is the historical advisor to the television series Versailles, 23 November 2015 broadcast on Canal+ from November 2015.

== Works ==
=== Publications ===
- Les Valets de chambre de Louis XIV, Éditions Perrin, series Pour l'Histoire, Paris, June 2004, ISBN 9782262030445
- Louis XIV et Versailles, éd. Arts Lys/Château de Versailles, Versailles, 2009
- Le Versailles de Louis XIV : Le fonctionnement d'une résidence royale au XVIIe, Perrin, series Pour l'Histoire, Paris, September 2009; reissued Le Grand Livre du mois and France Loisirs, 2010
- Alexandre Bontemps, Premier valet de chambre de Louis XIV, Perrin, series Les métiers de Versailles, Paris, October 2011
- Au service du roi. Dans les coulisses de Versailles, Éditions Tallandier, 2015.
- Versailles; Enquête historique. Tallandier. 2015. p. 256. ISBN 9791021010024.

=== Copublication ===
- Versailles pour les Nuls (with Raphaël Masson), First & Château de Versailles, March 2011. ISBN 9782754015523

=== Codirection of works ===
- 2010: Les Grandes galeries européennes, XVIIe/XIXe (with Claire Constans), Centre de recherche du château de Versailles/Éditions de la Maison des sciences de l'homme, series "Aulica"
- 2011: Cultures de cour, cultures du corps, XIVe/XVIIIe (with Catherine Lanoë and Bruno Laurioux), Presses de l'université Paris-Sorbonne, series "Mythes, Critique et Histoire"
- 2014: Louis XIV, l'image et le mythe (with Alexandre Maral and Nicolas Milovanovic), editions Presses universitaires de Rennes & Centre de recherche du château de Versailles, series Histoire, Aulica. L'univers de la cour
- 2015 Versailles : histoire, dictionnaire et anthologie(with Raphaël Masson), éditions Robert Laffont, series Bouquins
