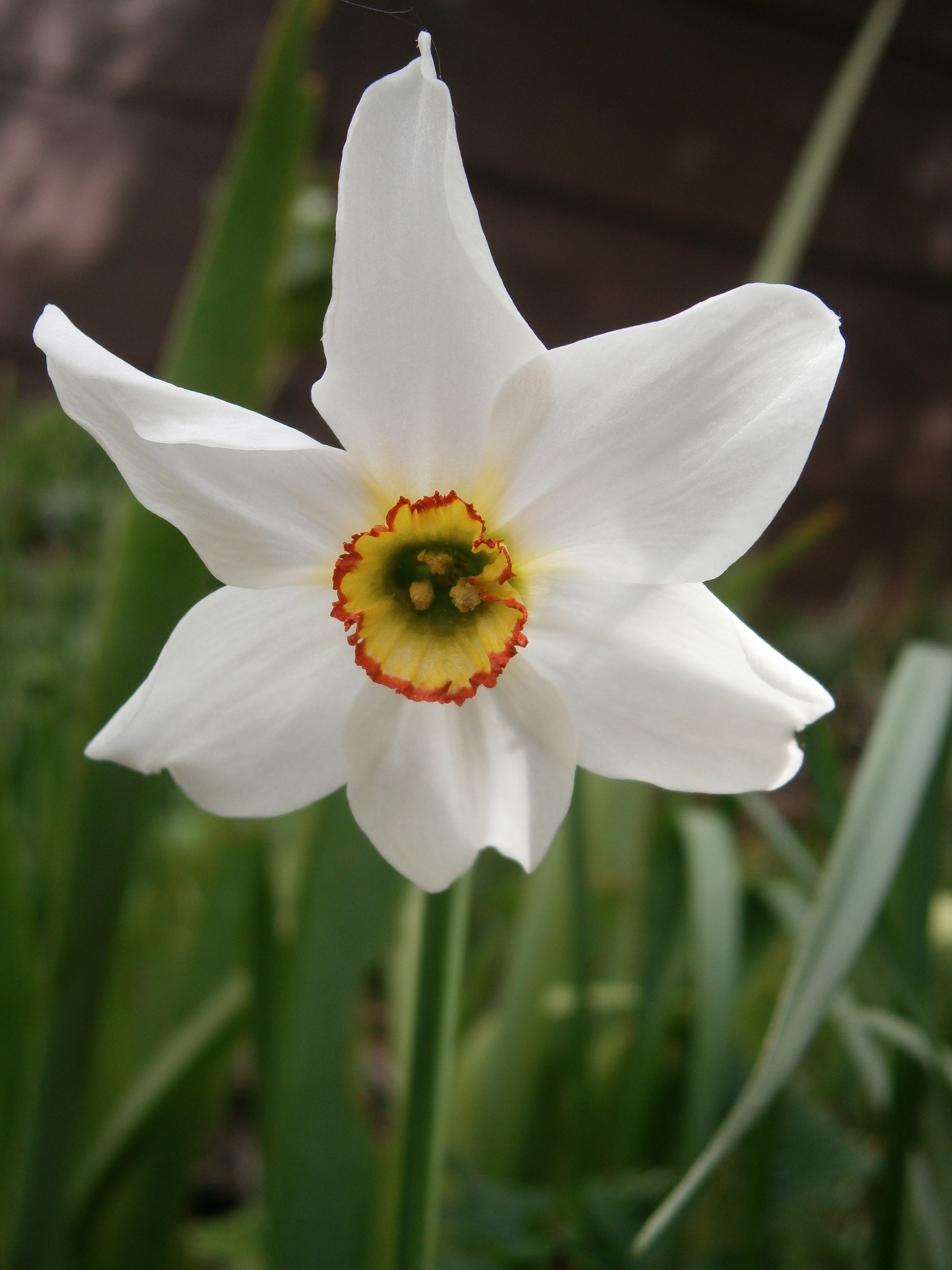

Conservation status
- Least Concern (IUCN 3.1)

Scientific classification
- Kingdom: Plantae
- Clade: Embryophytes
- Clade: Tracheophytes
- Clade: Angiosperms
- Clade: Monocots
- Order: Asparagales
- Family: Amaryllidaceae
- Subfamily: Amaryllidoideae
- Genus: Narcissus
- Species: N. poeticus

Binomial name
- Narcissus poeticus L.

Synonyms
- Autogenes angustifolius Raf.; Autogenes poeticus (L.) Raf.; Helena croceorincta Haw.; Helena purpureorincta Haw.; Hermione purpurocincta (Haw.) M.Roem.; Narcissus angustifolius Curtis ex Haw.; Narcissus hellenicus Pugsley; Narcissus majalis Curtis; Narcissus majalis var. plenus Haw.; Narcissus obliquus Tausch; Narcissus ornatus Haw.; Narcissus patellaris Salisb.; Narcissus purpureocinctus (Haw.) Spach; Narcissus recurvus Haw.; Narcissus tripedalis Lodd. ex Schult. & Schult.f.; Narcissus tripodalis Salisb. ex Herb.; Stephanophorum purpuraceum Dulac

= Narcissus poeticus =

Species of plant

Narcissus poeticus, the poet's daffodil, poet's narcissus, nargis, pheasant's eye, findern flower or pinkster lily, was one of the first daffodils to be cultivated, and is frequently identified as the narcissus of ancient times (although Narcissus tazetta and Narcissus jonquilla have also been considered as possibilities). It is also often associated with the Greek legend of Narcissus. It is the type species of the genus Narcissus.

== Description ==
The flower is extremely fragrant, with a ring of tepals in pure white and a short corona of light yellow with a distinct reddish edge. It grows to 20 to 40 cm (7.9 to 15.7 in) tall.

== Taxonomy ==
Narcissus poeticus was first described by Carl Linnaeus in his book Species Plantarum on page 289 in 1753.

== Distribution ==
Narcissus poeticus is native to central and southern Europe from Spain, France through Switzerland, Austria, Slovenia to Croatia, Albania, Greece and Ukraine. It is naturalised in Great Britain, Belgium, Germany, the Czech Republic, Azerbaijan, Turkey, New Zealand, British Columbia, Washington state, Oregon, Ontario, Quebec, Newfoundland, and much of the eastern United States, from Louisiana and Georgia north to Maine and Wisconsin.

== Legend and history ==
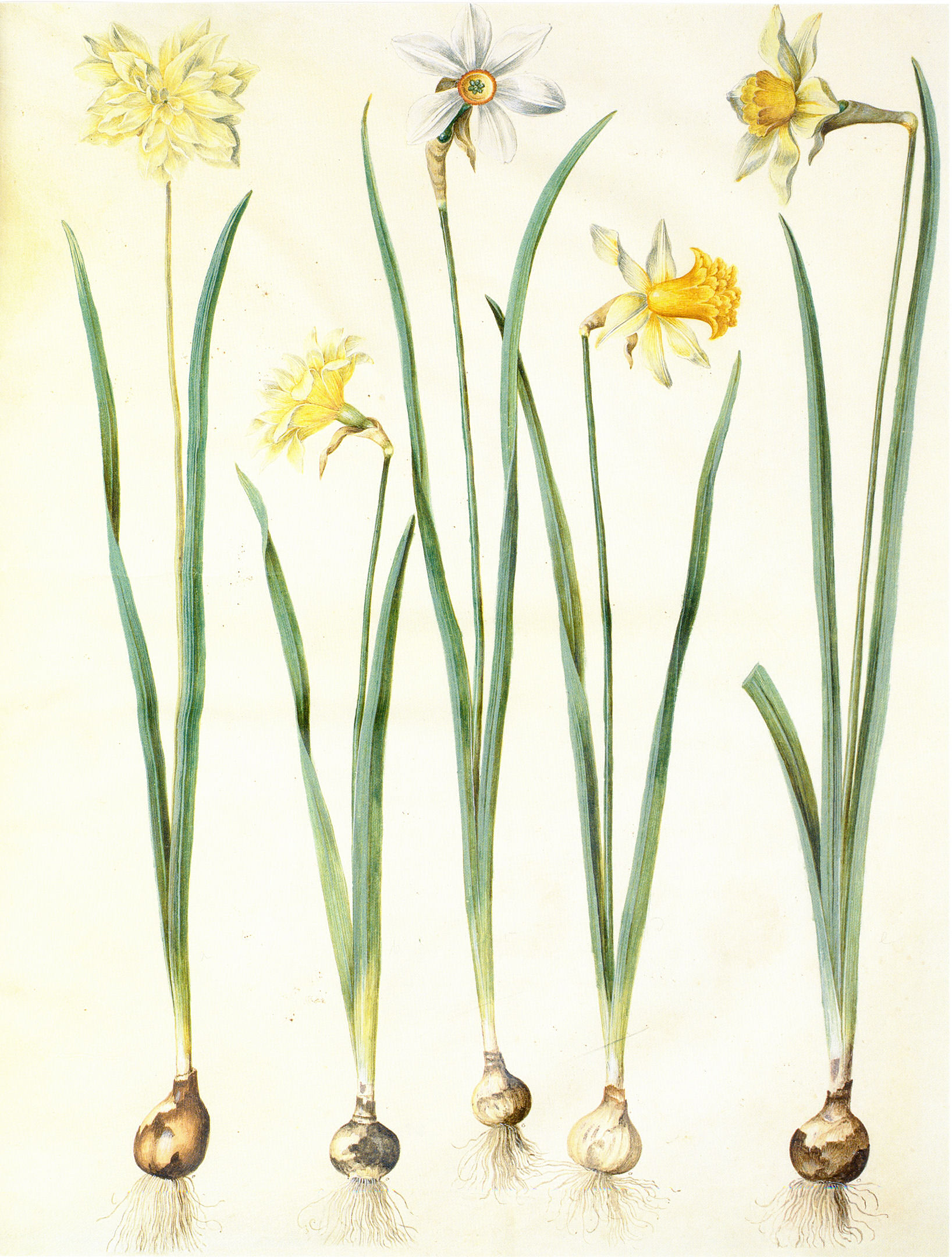
Botanical drawing, c. 1659 (N. poeticus in center)

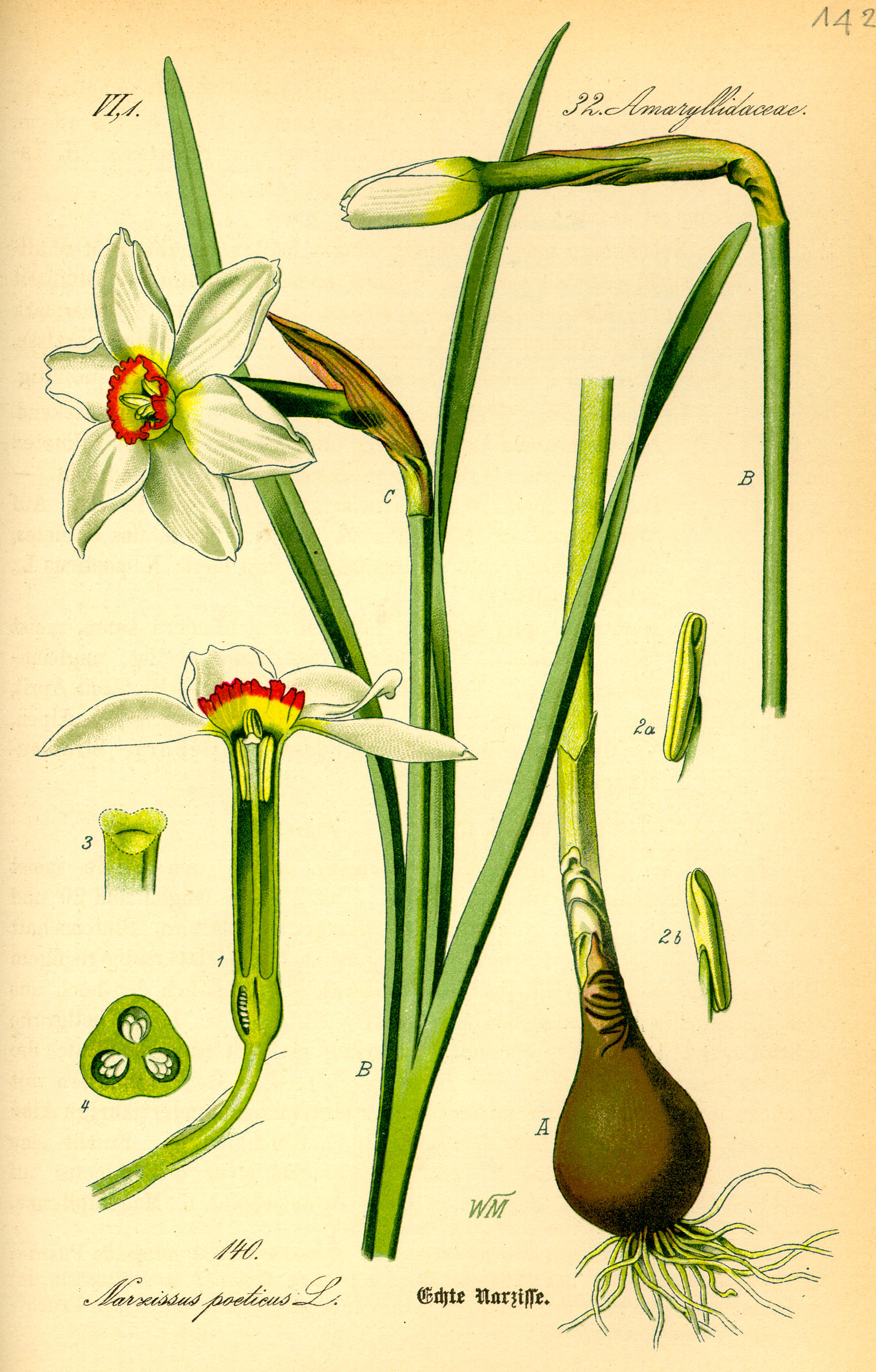
Botanical drawing from Otto Wilhelm Thomé's Flora von Deutschland, Österreich und der Schweiz (1885)

The earliest mention of poet's daffodil is likely in the Historia Plantarum (VI.6.9), the main botanical writing of Theophrastus (371 – c. 287 BCE), who wrote about a spring-blooming narcissus that the Loeb Classical Library editors identify as Narcissus poeticus. According to Theophrastus, the narcissus (νάρκισσος), also called leirion (λείριον), has a leafless stem, with the flower at the top. The plant blooms very late, after the setting of Arcturus about the equinox. The poet Virgil, in his fifth Eclogue, also wrote about a narcissus whose description corresponds with that of Narcissus poeticus. In one version of the myth about the Greek hero Narcissus, he was punished by the Goddess of vengeance, Nemesis, who turned him into a Narcissus flower that historians associate with Narcissus poeticus. The fragrant Narcissus poeticus has also been recognised as the flower that Persephone and her companions were gathering when Hades abducted her into the Underworld, according to Hellmut Baumann in The Greek Plant World in Myth, Art, and Literature. This myth accounts for the custom, which has lasted into modern times, of decorating graves with these flowers. Linnaeus, who gave the flower its name, quite possibly did so because he believed it was the one that inspired the tale of Narcissus, handed down by poets since ancient times.

== Uses ==
In medicine, it was described by Dioscorides in his Materia Medica as "Being laid on with Loliacean meal, & honey it draws out splinters". James Sutherland also mentioned it in his Hortus Medicus Edinburgensis. In Korea, it is used to treat conjunctivitus, urethritis and amenorrhoea.

=== Use in perfume ===
Poet's daffodil is cultivated in the Netherlands and southern France for its essential oil, narcissus oil, one of the most popular fragrances used in perfumes. Narcissus oil is used as a principal ingredient in 11% of modern quality perfumes—including 'Fatale' and 'Samsara'—as a floral concrete or absolute. The oil's fragrance resembles a combination of jasmine and hyacinth.

== Cultivation ==
Narcissus poeticus has long been cultivated in Europe. According to one legend, it was brought back to England from the crusades by Sir Geoffrey de Fynderne. It was still abundant in 1860 when historian Bernard Burke visited the village of Findern—where it still grows in certain gardens and has become an emblem of the village. It was introduced to America by the late 18th century, when Bernard McMahon of Philadelphia offered it among his narcissus. It may be the "sweet white narcissus" that Peter Collinson sent John Bartram in Philadelphia, only to be told that it was already common in Pennsylvania, having spread from its introduction by early settlers. The plant has naturalised throughout the eastern half of the United States and Canada, along with some western states and provinces.

Narcissus poeticus has long been hybridised with the wild British daffodil Narcissus pseudonarcissus, producing many named hybrids. These older heritage hybrids tend to be more elegant and graceful than modern hybrid daffodils, and are becoming available in the UK once again. One such cultivar is the popular 'Actaea', which has gained the Royal Horticultural Society's Award of Garden Merit.

N. poeticus var. recurvus, the old pheasant's eye daffodil, has also won the AGM.

== Toxicity ==
While all narcissi are poisonous when eaten, poet's daffodil is more dangerous than others, acting as a strong emetic and irritant. The scent can be powerful enough to cause headache and vomiting if a large quantity is kept in a closed room.

== Photo gallery ==
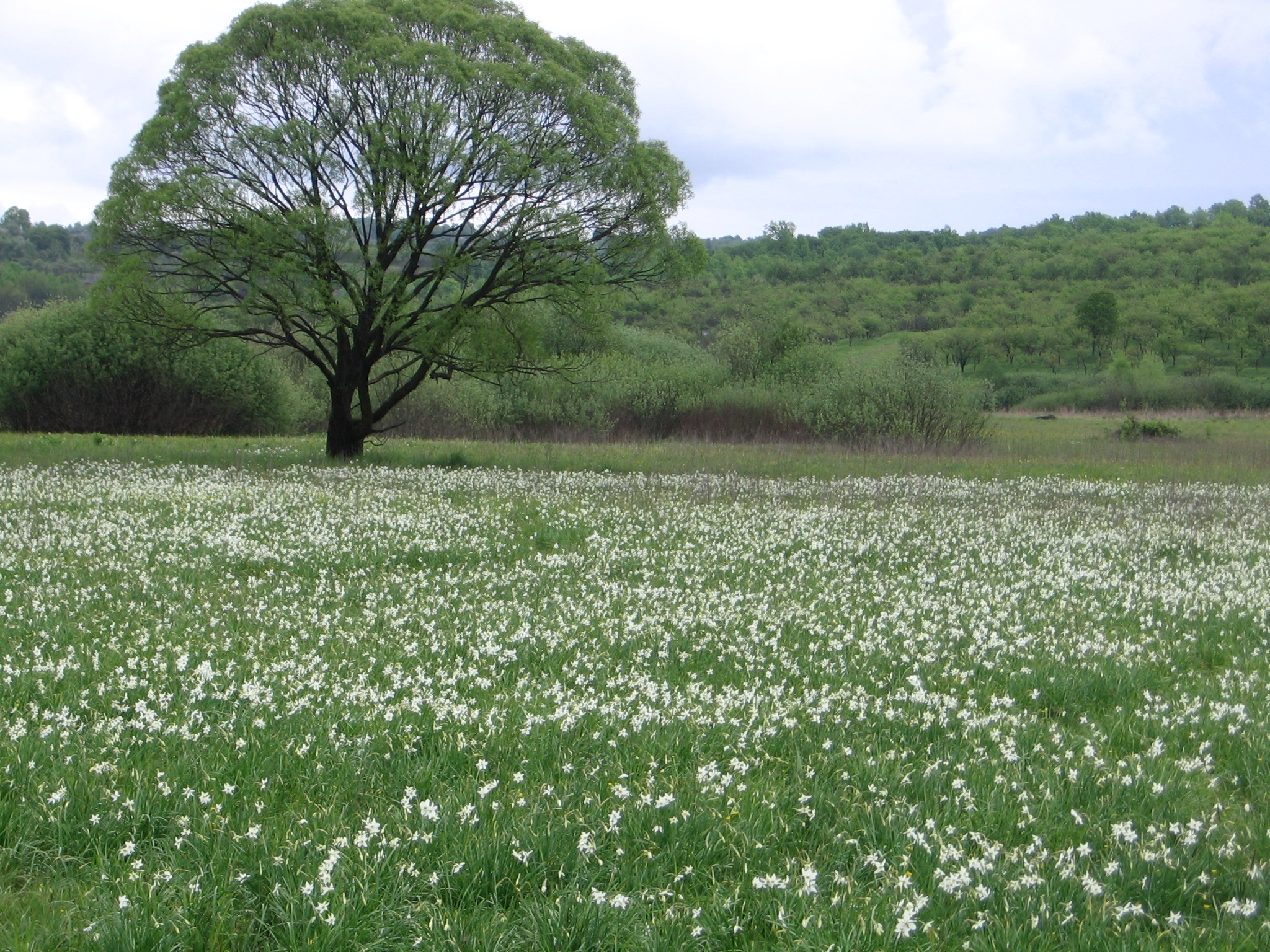
"Valley of Narcissus" – natural lowland habitat in the Transcarpathian region, Ukraine

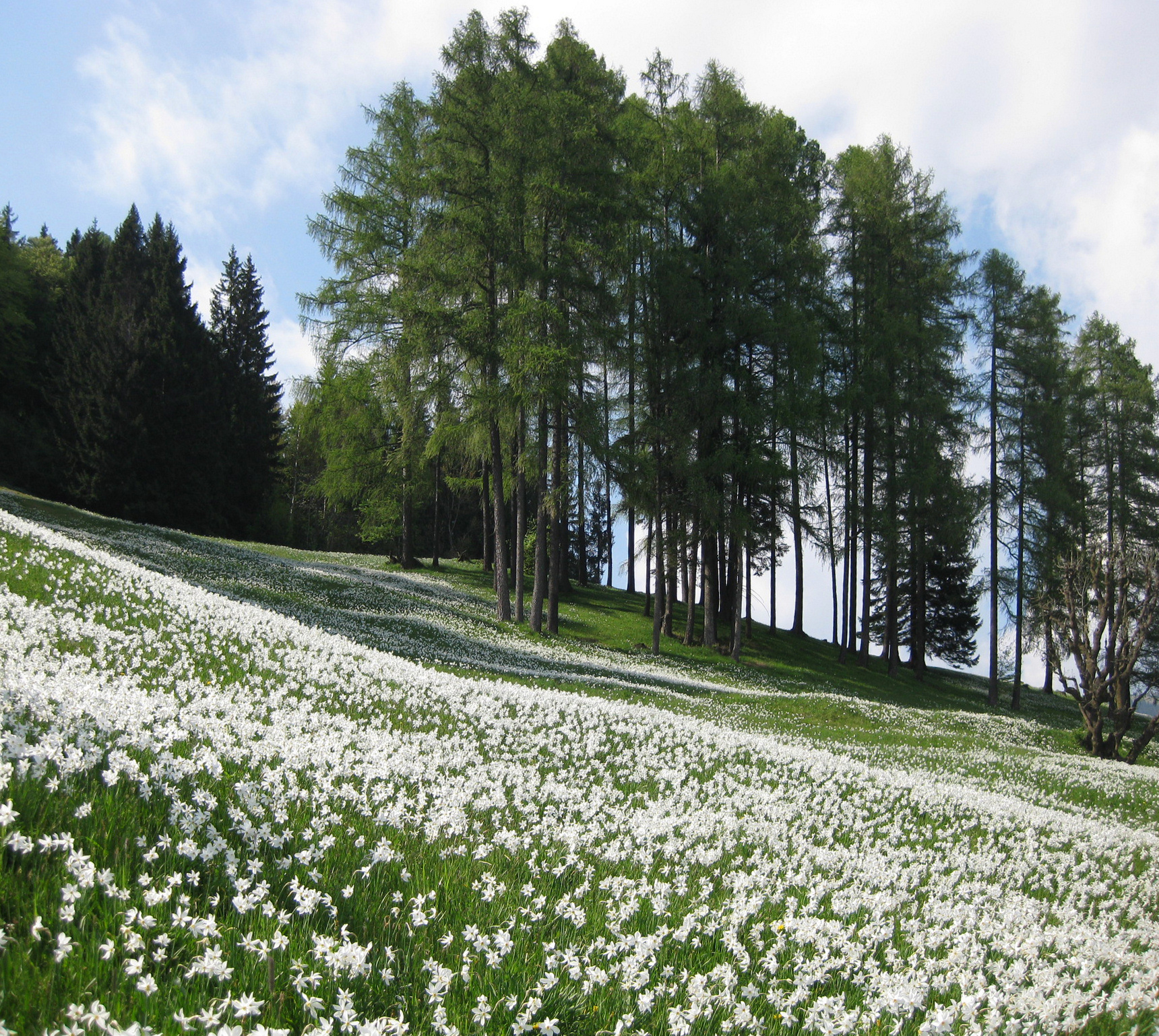
Field of naturalised N. poeticus in Slovenia

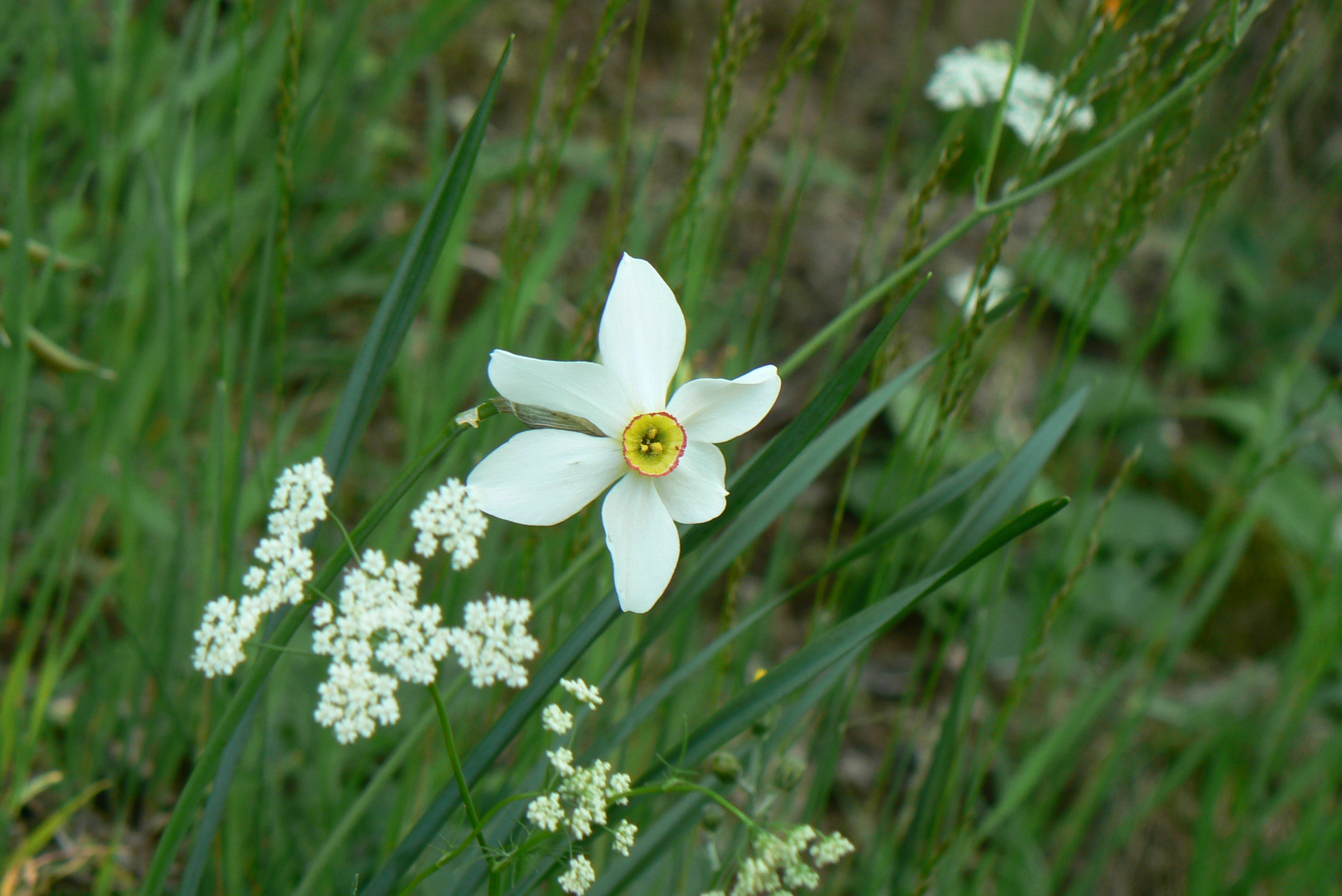
Wild N. poeticus in the Ardèche

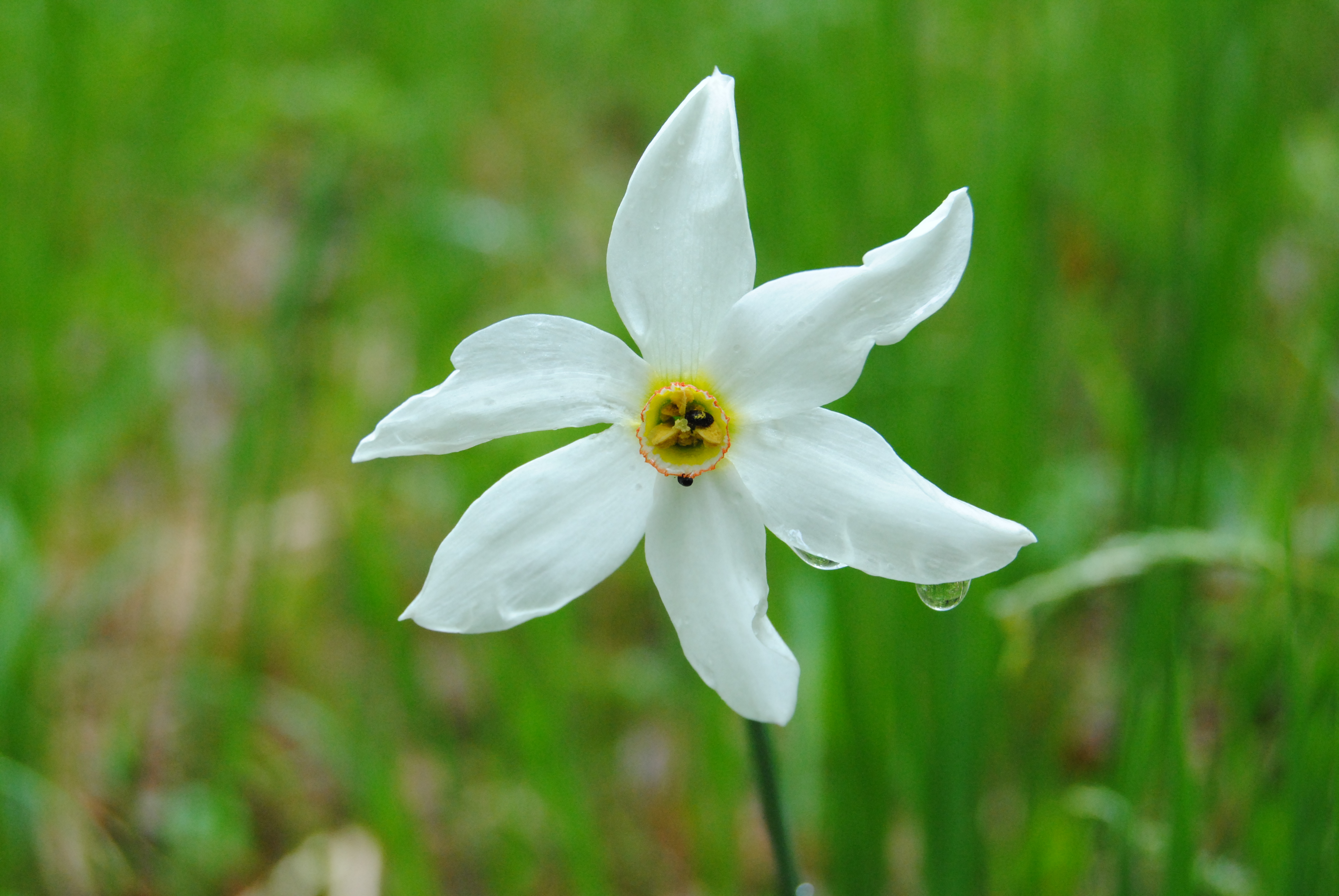
In flower in the Daffodil Meadow, Brașov County, Romania

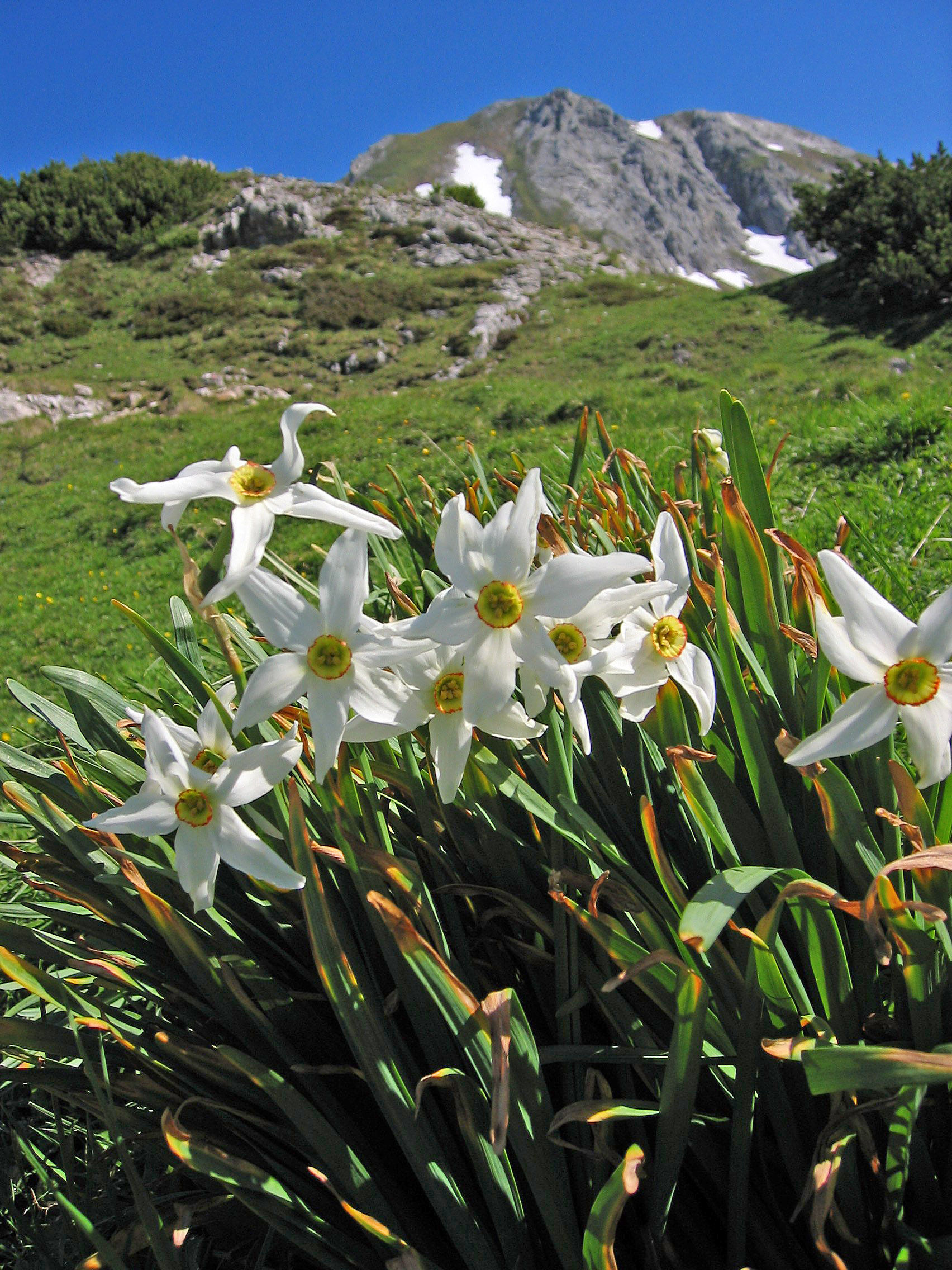
Near Admonter Haus, Styria, Austria (~1750 m)

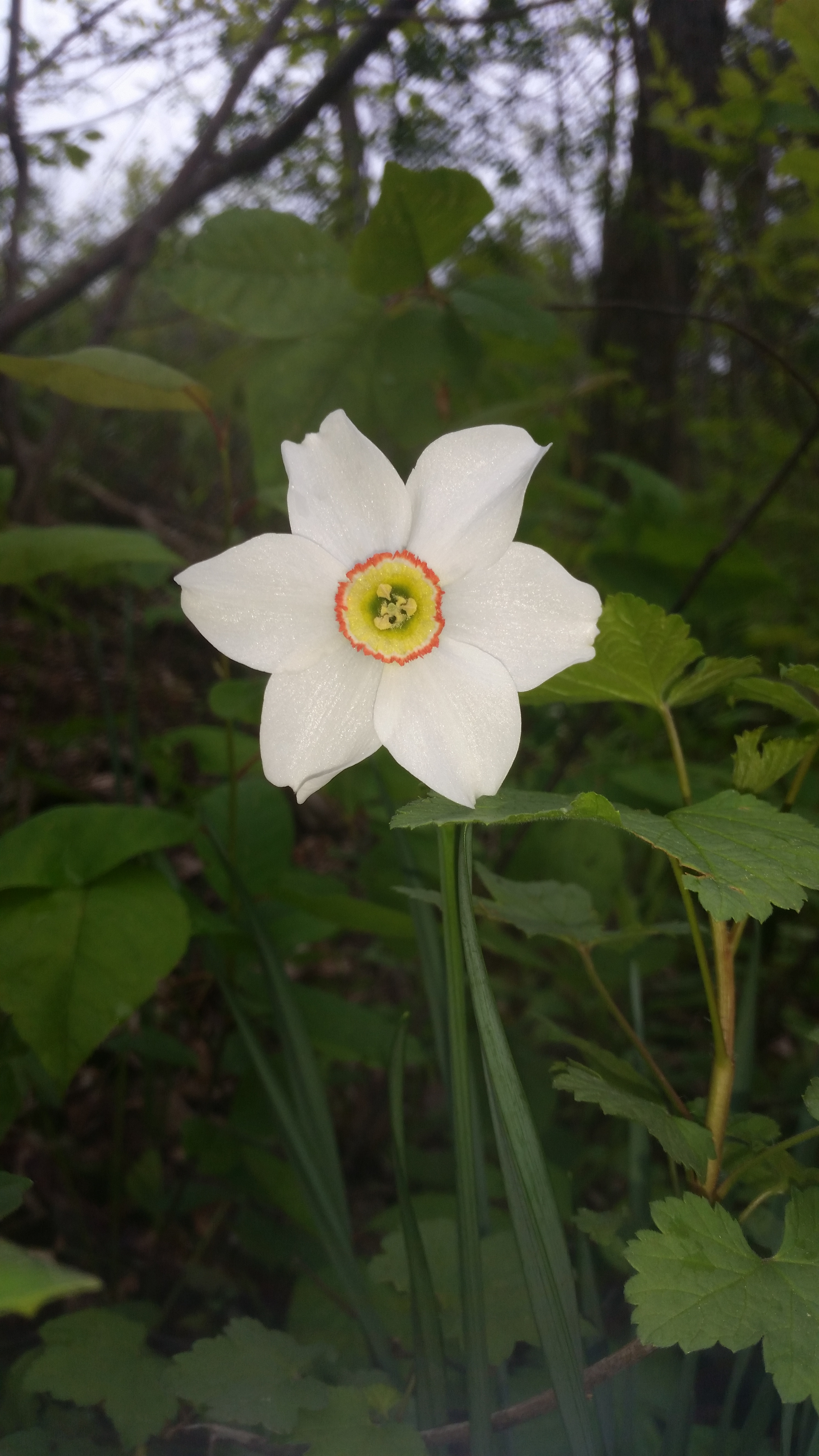
A Narcissus poeticus flower in Burlington, Ontario, Canada

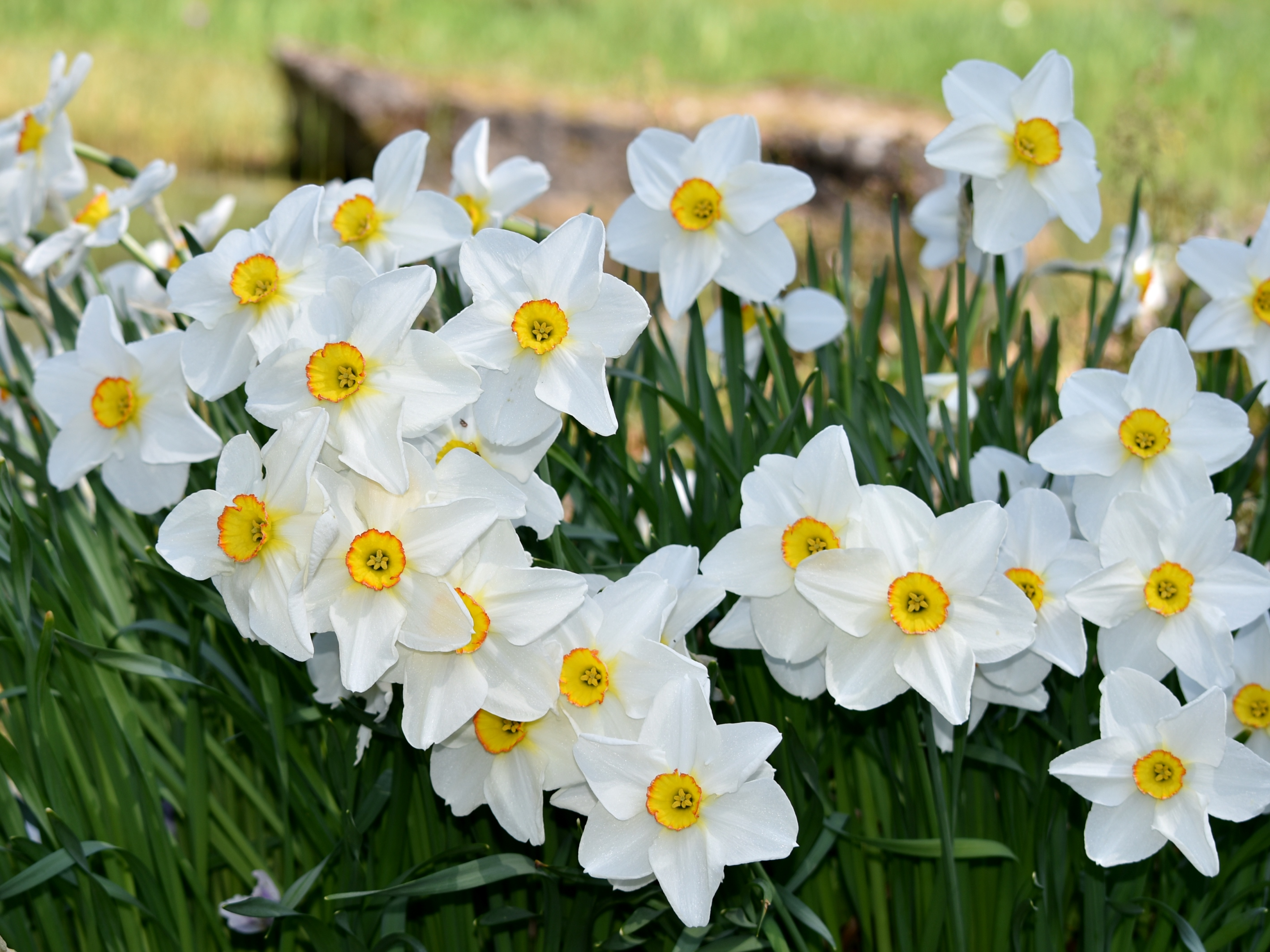
Narcissus poeticus "Actaea" in Berggarten Hannover

== Other sources ==
- Webster's third new international dictionary. 1961 (Websters Dict)
- Aldén, B., S. Ryman & M. Hjertson Våra kulturväxters namn - ursprung och användning. Formas, Stockholm (Handbook on Swedish cultivated and utility plants, their names and origin). 2009 (Vara kulturvaxt namn)
- Ali, S. I. & S. M. H. Jafri, eds. Flora of Libya. 1976- (F Libya)
- Botanical Society of the British Isles BSBI taxon database (on-line resource). (BSBI)
- Craker, L. E. & J. E. Simon, eds. Herbs, spices, and medicinal plants, 2 vols. 1986-1987 (HerbSpices)
- Czerepanov, S. K. Vascular plants of Russia and adjacent states (the former USSR). 1995 (L USSR)
- Davis, P. H., ed. Flora of Turkey and the east Aegean islands. 1965-1988 (F Turk)
- Encke, F. et al. Zander: Handwörterbuch der Pflanzennamen, 13. Auflage. 1984 (Zander ed13)
- Fernandes, A. 1951. Sur la phylogénie des espéces du genre:Narcissus L. Bol. Soc. Brot. 25:148.
- Fernandes, A. 1968. Keys to the identification of native and naturalized taxa of the genus Narcissus L. Daffodil Tulip Year Book 48.
- Gleason, H. A. & A. Cronquist Manual of vascular plants of northeastern United States and adjacent Canada, ed. 2. 1991 (Glea Cron ed2)
- Haines, A. & T. F. Vining Flora of Maine: a manual for identification of native and naturalized vascular plants of Maine. 1998 (F Maine)
- Hanks, G. R., ed. Narcissus and daffodil: the genus Narcissus. Medicinal and aromatic plants - industrial profiles volume 21. 2002 (Narcissus Hanks) 34.
- Hinds, H. R. Flora of New Brunswick, ed. 2. 2000 (F New Brunswick)
- Huxley, A., ed. The new Royal Horticultural Society dictionary of gardening. 1992 (Dict Gard)
- Jefferson-Brown, M. Narcissus. 1991 (Narcissus Jeff-Brown) 49.
- Kington, S. The international daffodil register and classified list 1998. 1998 (Daffodil Reg List 98)
- Komarov, V. L. et al., eds. Flora SSSR. 1934-1964 (F USSR)
- Lampe, K. F. & M. A. McCann AMA handbook of poisonous and injurious plants. 1985 (Lampe & McCann)
- Liberty Hyde Bailey Hortorium Hortus third. 1976 (Hortus 3)
- Maire, R. C. J. E. et al. Flore de l'Afrique du Nord. 1952- (F Afr Nord) 75.
- Munro, D. B. Canadian poisonous plants information system (on-line resource). (Can Poison Pl)
- Pajaujis Anonis, D. Flower oils and floral compounds in perfumery. 1993 (Flower Oils)
- Pignatti, S. Flora d'Italia. 1982 (F Ital)
- Radford, A. E. et al. Manual of the vascular flora of the Carolinas. 1964 (F Carolin)
- Rehm, S. Multilingual dictionary of agronomic plants. 1994 (Dict Rehm)
- Salmon, M. 1993. Narcissus section Pseudonarcissus: its subspecies and their distribution (Daffodils) 1993-4:50.
- Tutin, T. G. et al., eds. Flora europaea. 1964-1980 (F Eur)
- Walters, S. M. et al., eds. European garden flora. 1986- (Eur Gard F)
- Webb, D. A. 1978. Taxonomic notes on Narcissus L. In: V. E. Heywood (ed.), Flora europaea. Notulae systematicae ad floram Europaeam spectantes. No. 20 Bot. J. Linn. Soc. 76:298-307.
