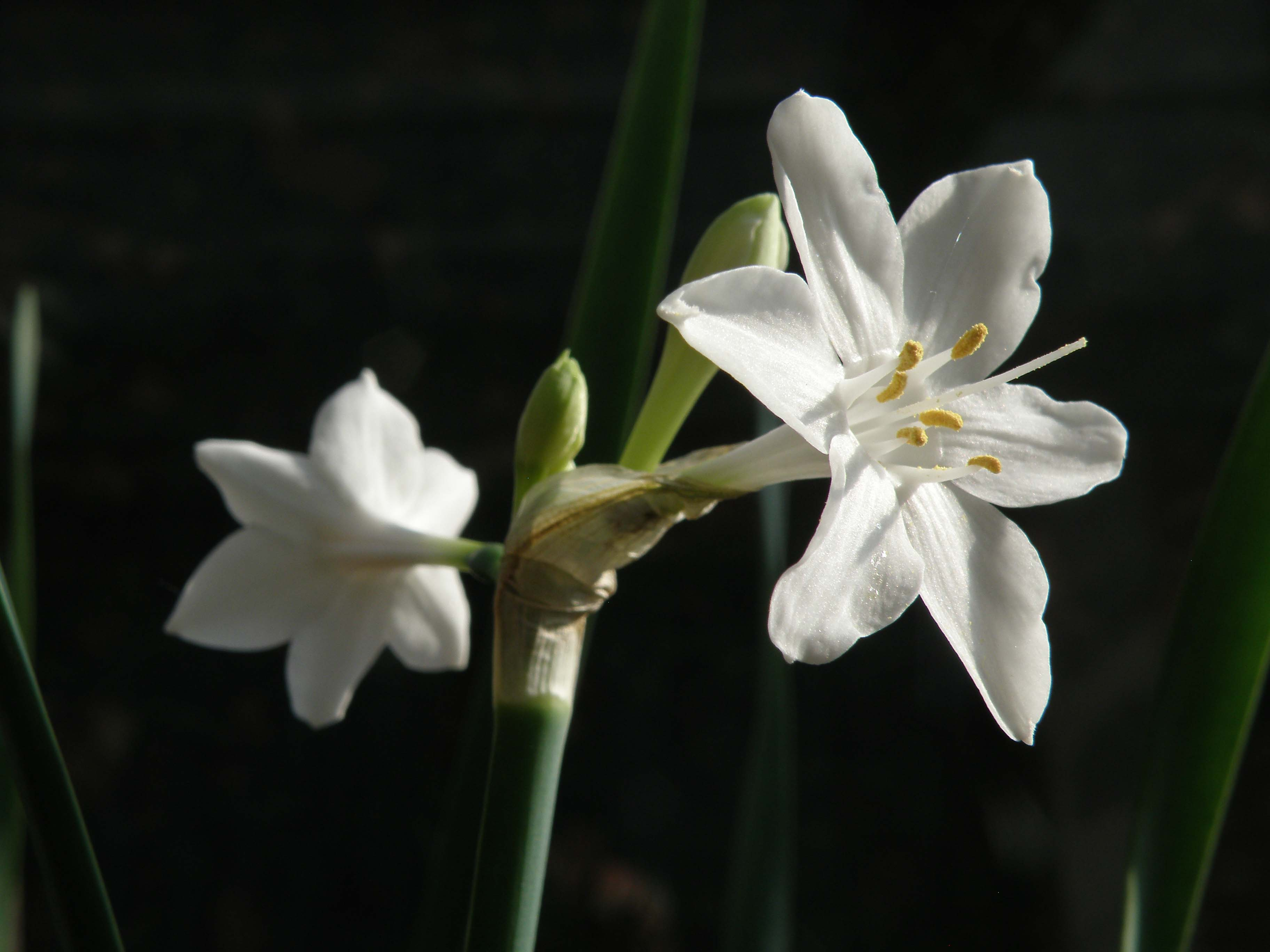

Scientific classification
- Kingdom: Plantae
- Clade: Embryophytes
- Clade: Tracheophytes
- Clade: Spermatophytes
- Clade: Angiosperms
- Clade: Monocots
- Order: Asparagales
- Family: Amaryllidaceae
- Subfamily: Amaryllidoideae
- Genus: Narcissus
- Species: N. broussonetii

Binomial name
- Narcissus broussonetii Lag.

Synonyms
- Aurelia broussonetii (Lag.) J.Gay

= Narcissus broussonetii =

Species of daffodil

Narcissus broussonetii is a species of the genus Narcissus (daffodils) in the family Amaryllidaceae. It is classified in Section Aurelia. This species is endemic to Morocco.

== Description ==
The plant features gray-green leaves and blooms in the autumn, displaying up to ten white flowers arranged in an umbel. Notably, these flowers possess a long corolla tube and lack a prominent crown. Although the plant does not exhibit any detectable odor in the collected samples, there have been reports, such as those by Angelo Porcelli, suggesting that certain forms emit a sweet jasmine-like fragrance.

== Taxonomy ==
Narcissus broussonetii was described by the Spanish botanist, Mariano Lagasca and published in Genera et species plantarum 1, in the year 1816.

=== Etymology ===
The genus name Narcissus is derived from the Greek mythological character Νάρκισσος (Narkissos), who was known for his striking beauty. He was the son of the river god Cephissus and the nymph Leiriope. The name reflects the notable beauty associated with the flowers of this genus.

The name Narcissus is derived from the Greek word ναρκάω (narkào), meaning "to numb," referencing the narcotic-like, intoxicating scent of some species' flowers. There is an alternative theory suggesting the name originates from the Persian word نرگس (nargis), which also denotes an intoxicating quality associated with the plant.

==== Specific Epithet ====
The specific epithet broussonetii honors Pierre Marie Auguste Broussonet (1761–1807), a French botanist notable for introducing Broussonetia papyrifera, a species of mulberry, from China to Europe towards the end of the 18th century.

==== Synonymy ====
Aurelia broussonetii (Lag.) J.Gay Chloraster oblitteratus (Willd. ex Schult. & Schult.f.) M.Roem. Hermione obliterata Haw. Narcissus broussonetii f. grandiflorus (Batt. & Trab.) Maire Narcissus broussonetii var. grandiflorus Batt. & Trab. Narcissus oblitteratus Willd. ex Schult. & Schult.f.3
