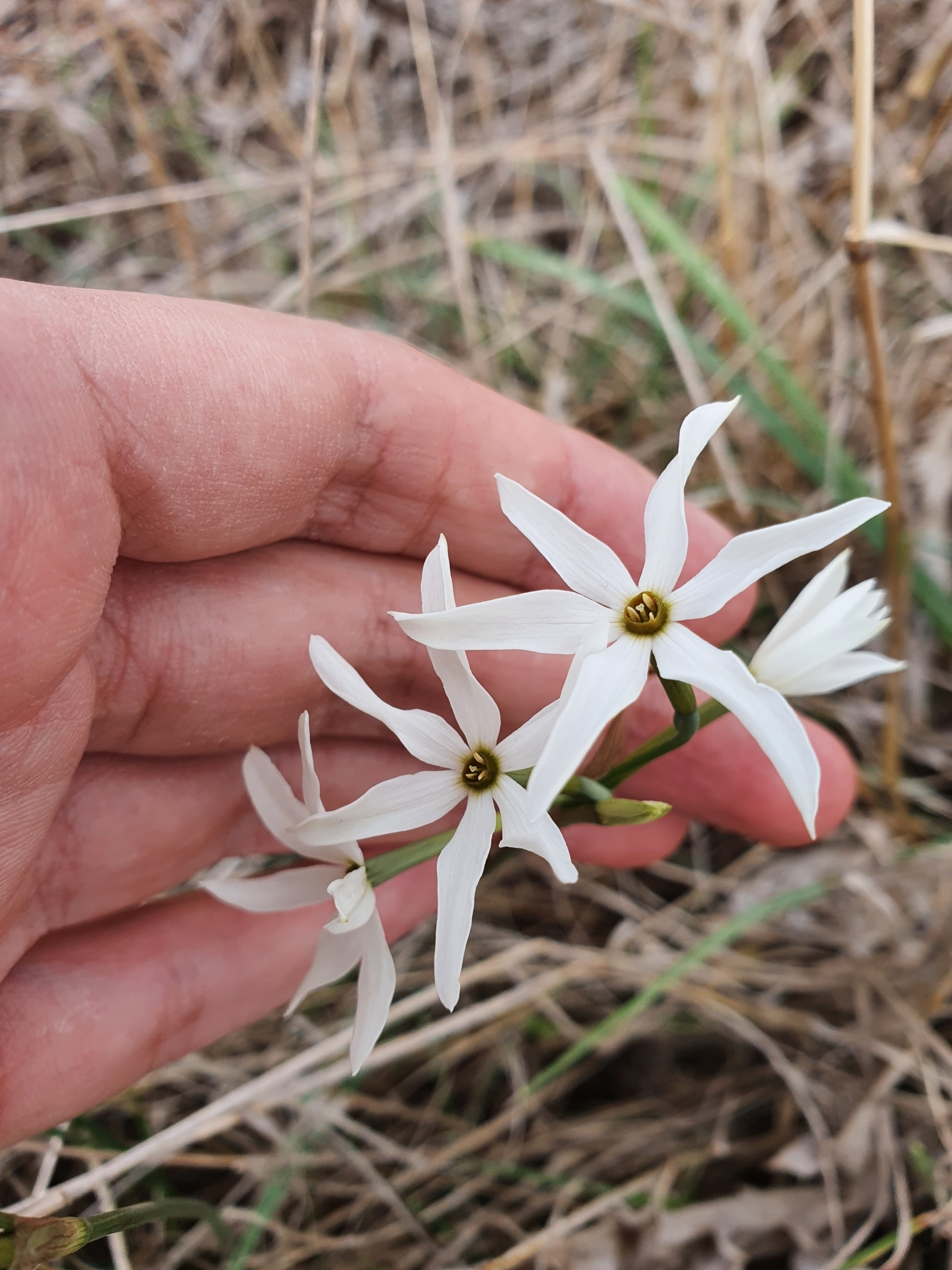

Scientific classification
- Kingdom: Plantae
- Clade: Tracheophytes
- Clade: Angiosperms
- Clade: Monocots
- Order: Asparagales
- Family: Amaryllidaceae
- Subfamily: Amaryllidoideae
- Genus: Narcissus
- Species: N. elegans

Binomial name
- Narcissus elegans (Haw.) Spach

Synonyms
- Hermione autumnalis (Link) M.Roem.

= Narcissus elegans =

Species of daffodil

Narcissus elegans is a species of flowering plant in the genus Narcissus (daffodils) in the family Amaryllidaceae. This bulbous perennial is classified in Section Tazettae and is native to the western Mediterranean.

== Description ==
Narcissus elegans is commonly found in scrublands and long-abandoned fields. It can be distinguished from Narcissus serotinus by several key characteristics: N. elegans typically has multiple flowers in its inflorescence and develops leaves concurrently with flowering, whereas N. serotinus does not have leaves during its flowering period. Additionally, the leaves of N. elegans are flat, contrasting with the cylindrical leaves of N. serotinus. The flowers of N. elegans are white with an orange central corona; the petals are notably narrow and sometimes curve backward. This species blooms in the autumn.

== Taxonomy ==
Narcissus elegans was described by botanists (Haw.) Spach. The description was published in Histoire Naturelle des Végétaux, Classés par Familles, volume 12, on page 452, in the year 1846.

=== Cytology ===
The chromosome number for Narcissus elegans, belonging to the family Amaryllidaceae, and its infraspecific taxa is documented as 2n=20.

=== Etymology ===
The genus name Narcissus is derived from the Greek mythological character Νάρκισσος (Narkissos), who was known for his striking beauty. He was the son of the river god Cephissus and the nymph Leiriope. The name reflects the notable beauty associated with the flowers of this genus.

The name Narcissus is derived from the Greek word ναρκάω (narkào), meaning "to numb," referencing the narcotic-like, intoxicating scent of some species' flowers. There is an alternative theory suggesting the name originates from the Persian word نرگس (nargis), which also denotes an intoxicating quality associated with the plant.

=== Specific Epithet ===
The specific epithet elegans is derived from Latin, meaning "elegant." This descriptor is used to highlight the graceful and refined appearance of the plant.
