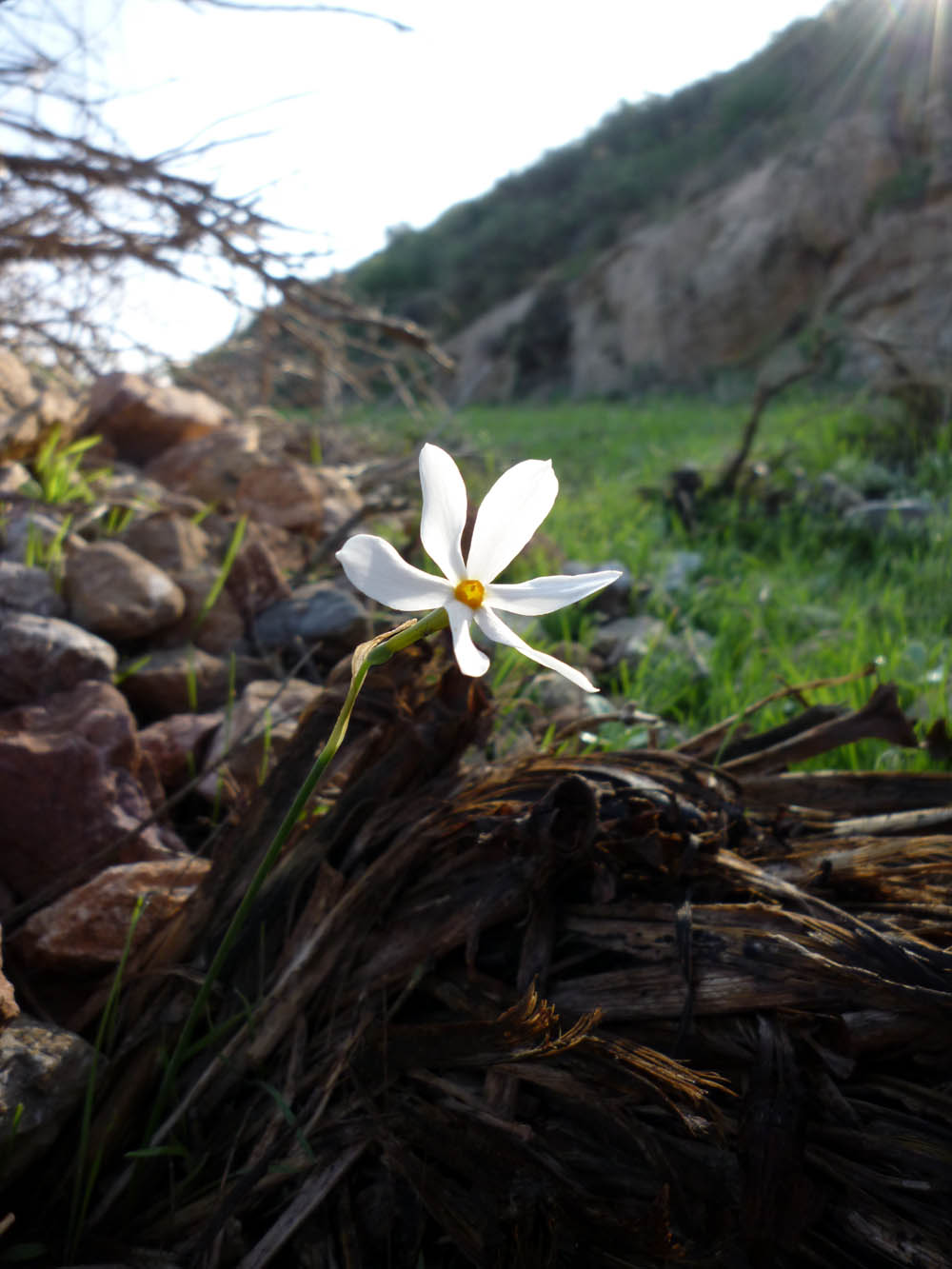

Scientific classification
- Kingdom: Plantae
- Clade: Tracheophytes
- Clade: Angiosperms
- Clade: Monocots
- Order: Asparagales
- Family: Amaryllidaceae
- Subfamily: Amaryllidoideae
- Genus: Narcissus
- Species: N. serotinus

Binomial name
- Narcissus serotinus L.

Synonyms
- Hermione serotina (L.) Haw.

= Narcissus serotinus =

Species of daffodil

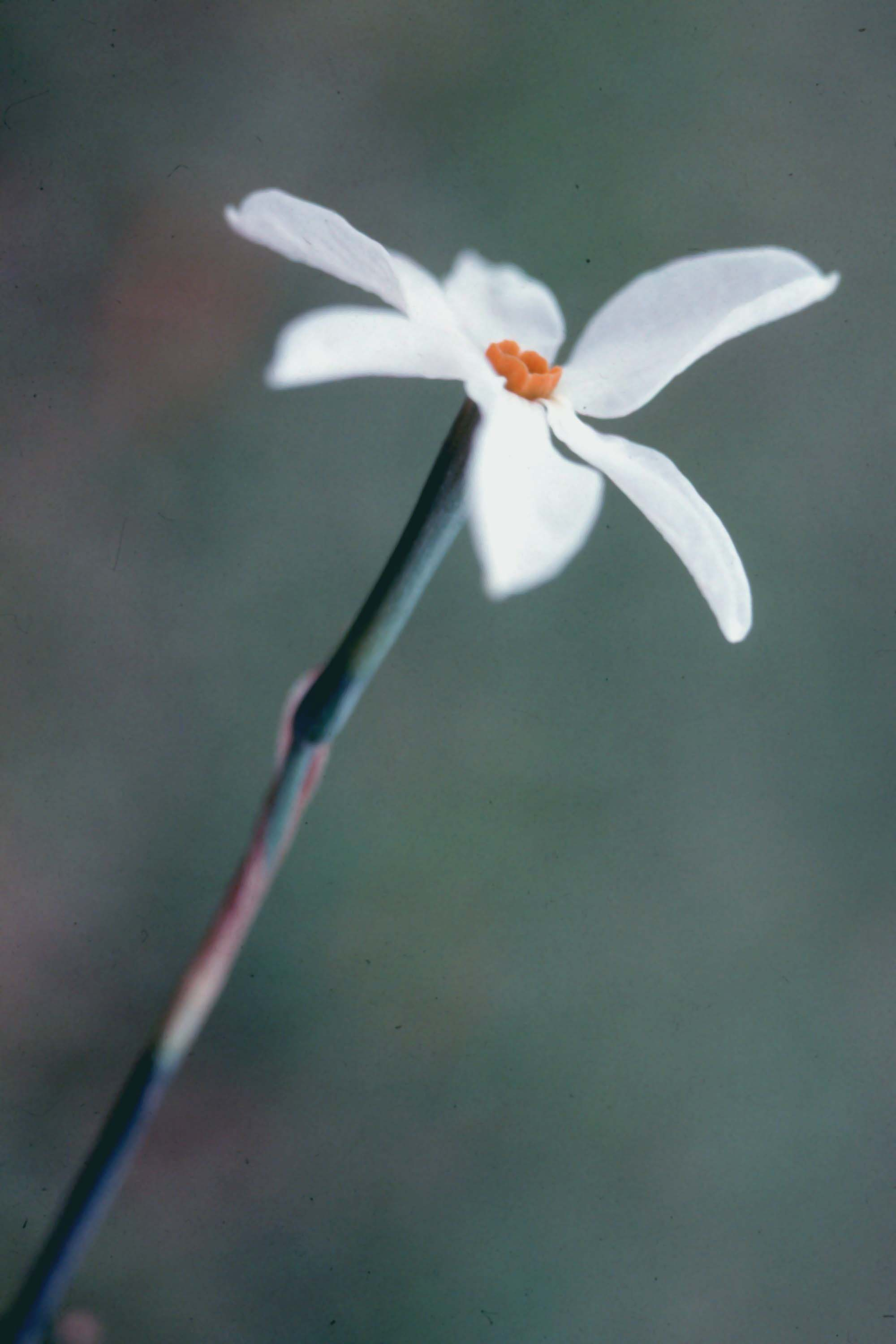
Reduced corona

Narcissus serotinus is a autumn-flowering species of the genus Narcissus (daffodils) in the family Amaryllidaceae. It is classified in Section Serotini. It is native to Portugal, Spain, and Morocco. Records further east in the Mediterranean refer to Narcissus obsoletus and Narcissus elegans.

== Description ==
Narcissus serotinus has one of the smallest coronas of the genus (see illustration). The flowers are fragrant, the tepals white and the small corona yellow.
