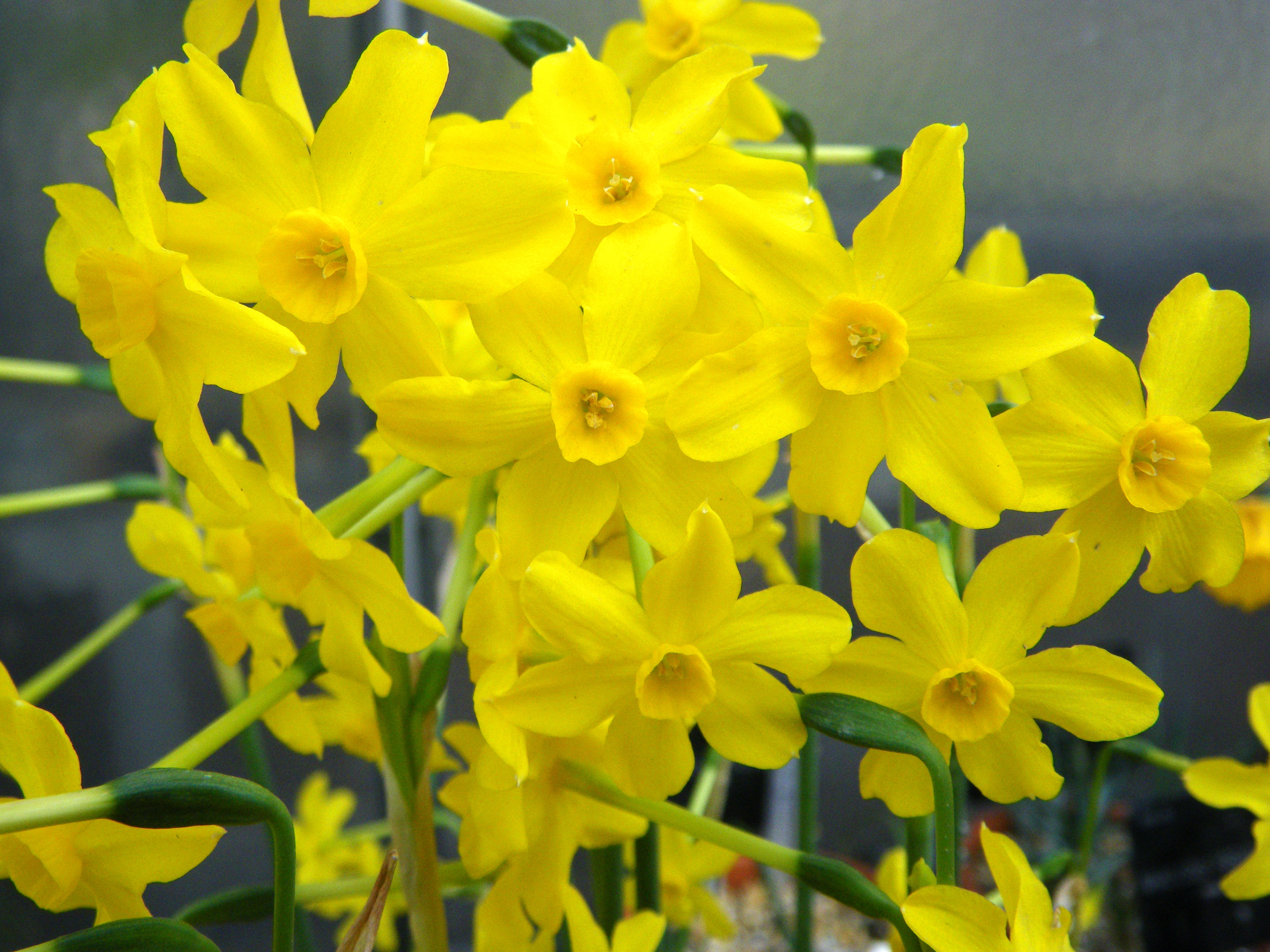

Conservation status
- Data Deficient (IUCN 3.1)

Scientific classification
- Kingdom: Plantae
- Clade: Tracheophytes
- Clade: Angiosperms
- Clade: Monocots
- Order: Asparagales
- Family: Amaryllidaceae
- Subfamily: Amaryllidoideae
- Genus: Narcissus
- Species: N. jonquilla

Binomial name
- Narcissus jonquilla L.
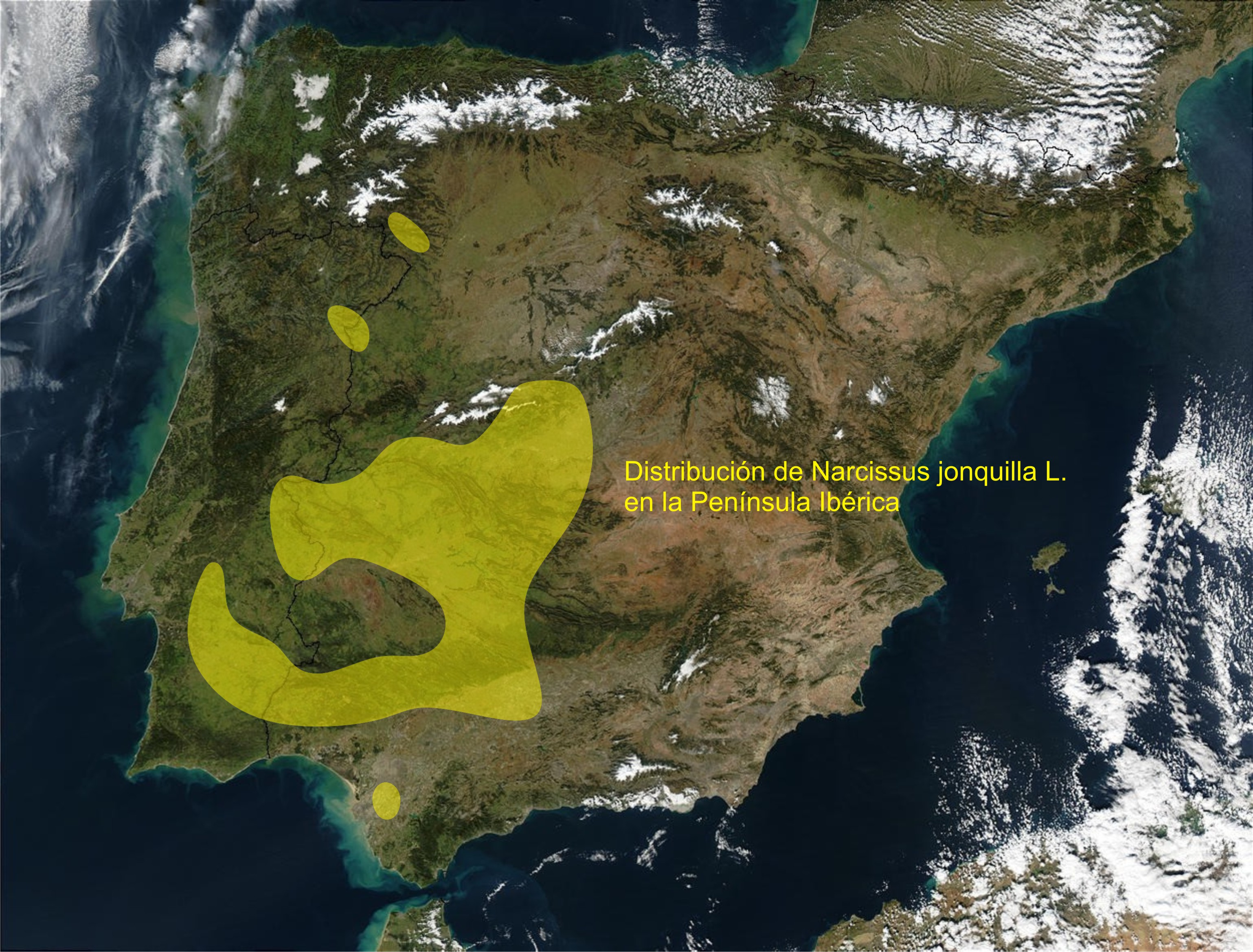
- Distribution range on the Iberian Peninsula

Synonyms
- Narcissus juncifolius Salisb. nom. illeg.

= Narcissus jonquilla =

Jonquil or rush daffodil

Species of daffodil

Narcissus jonquilla, commonly known as jonquil or rush daffodil, is a bulbous flowering plant, a species of the genus Narcissus (daffodil) that is native to Spain and Portugal but has now become naturalised in many other regions: France, Italy, Turkey, the former Yugoslavia, Madeira, British Columbia in Canada, Utah, Illinois, Minnesota, Ohio, and the southeastern United States from Texas to Maryland.

Narcissus jonquilla bears long, narrow, rush-like leaves (hence the name jonquil, Spanish junquillo, from the Latin juncus 'rush'). In late spring it bears heads of up to five scented yellow or white flowers. It is a parent of numerous varieties within Division 7 of the horticultural classification. Division 7 in the Royal Horticultural Society classification of Narcissus includes N. jonquilla and N. apodanthus hybrids and cultivars that show clear characteristics of those two species.

N. jonquilla has been cultivated since the 18th century in France as the strongest of the Narcissus species used in narcissus oil, a component of many modern perfumes.
