= Narcissus =

Narcissus most commonly refers to:

- Narcissus (mythology), a character from Greek mythology
- Narcissus (plant), a genus of flowering plants also known as daffodils

Narcissus may also refer to:

== People ==
- Narcissus (wrestler) (2nd century), assassin of the Roman emperor Commodus
- Tiberius Claudius Narcissus (1st century), freedman and secretary to the Roman emperor Claudius
- Saint Narcissus (disambiguation), several saints

== Film ==
- Narcissus (1983 film), a film by Norman McLaren
- Narcissus (2012 film), a Lithuanian film
- Narcissus (2015 film), a Tunisian film
- Pink Narcissus, a film by James Bidgood
- Narcissus, a 1956 film by Willard Maas
- Black Narcissus, a 1947 film by Powell and Pressburger
- Narcissus, an escape shuttle in the Aliens film series

== Music ==
- Narcissus, a 2010 album by the Danish band Kellermensch
- Narcissus, a 2019 EP by South Korean boy group SF9
- "Narcissus" (music), a piano piece by Ethelbert Nevin, recorded as a duet by Norman Wisdom and Joyce Grenfell
- Narcissus (band)
- Narcissus, an opera by Gottfried Heinrich Stölzel
- Écho et Narcisse, an opera by Christoph Willibald Gluck
- "Narcissus", a song by Alanis Morissette on the 2002 album Under Rug Swept
- "Narcissus", a 2019 single by Róisín Murphy later released on Róisín Machine
- "Narcissus", a 2020 single by Paris Paloma

== Literature ==
- Echo and Narcissus, a poem by Ovid
- Narcissus and Goldmund, a novel by Hermann Hesse
- The Nigger of the 'Narcissus', a novel by Joseph Conrad

== Other uses ==
- Narcissus (Caravaggio), a c. 1597–1599 painting by Caravaggio
- Narcissus (Lemoyne), a 1728 painting by François Lemoyne
- HMS Narcissus, a name borne by six ships of the Royal Navy
- Operation Narcissus, a military operation
- Narcissus effect, a type of stray light contamination where thermal radiation from an infrared detector reflects back to itself from lens surfaces
- 37117 Narcissus, a centaur minor planet

== See also ==
- Narcis (disambiguation)
- Narcisa (disambiguation)
- Narciso (disambiguation)
- Narcissa (disambiguation)
- Narcissu, a Japanese visual novel video game
- Narciss, a Soviet subminiature single lens reflex camera from the 1960s
- Narcissism (disambiguation)
- Nargis (disambiguation)
