= Nargess =

Nargess or Narges may refer to:

- Nargess (film), a 1992 Iranian feature film by Rakhshan Bani-Etemad
- Nargess (TV series), an Iranian soap opera television series
- Nargess (given name), an Iranian female given name
- Narges, Iran, a village in western Iran

== See also ==
- Nargis (disambiguation)
- Narcissus (disambiguation)
