= Narcissa =

Narcissa may refer to:

== People with the given name ==
- Florence Foster Jenkins, born Narcissa Florence Foster, American socialite and amateur soprano
- Narcissa California Gibson, American farmer, rancher, and politician
- Narcissa White Kinney, American temperance worker
- Narcissa Chisholm Owen, Native American educator, memoirist, and artist
- Narcissa Niblack Thorne (1882–1966), American artist
- Narcissa Cox Vanderlip, American suffragist
- Narcissa Whitman (1808–1847), American missionary
- Narcissa Wright (born 1989), American speedrunner
- Narcissa Yager (1875–1945), American clubwoman

== Other uses ==
- Narcissa, Oklahoma, a place in the United States
  - Narcissa D-X Gas Station
- Narcissa Malfoy, fictional character in the Harry Potter universe

== See also ==
- Narcisa (disambiguation)
- Narciso, a given name
- Narcisse (disambiguation)
- Narcissus (disambiguation)
- Narcis (disambiguation)
