= Narcissism (disambiguation) =

Narcissism is a self-centered personality style.

Narcissism may also refer to:

- Healthy narcissism, a normal developmental personality trait
- Narcissistic personality disorder, clinical condition, pathological self-centeredness
- History of narcissism, the history of the meaning of narcissism

== Mathematics ==
- Narcissistic number, integer expressible as the sum of the (number of digits)th power of each of its digits

== Other ==
- Narcissistic rage and narcissistic injury, a significant wound to the ego
- Narcissistic leadership, a leadership style (management)

== See also ==
- Narcissa (disambiguation)
- Narcissus (disambiguation)
