= Kaunas International Film Festival =

Annual film festival in Kaunas, Lithuania

Kaunas International Film Festival Tarptautinis Kauno kino festivalis
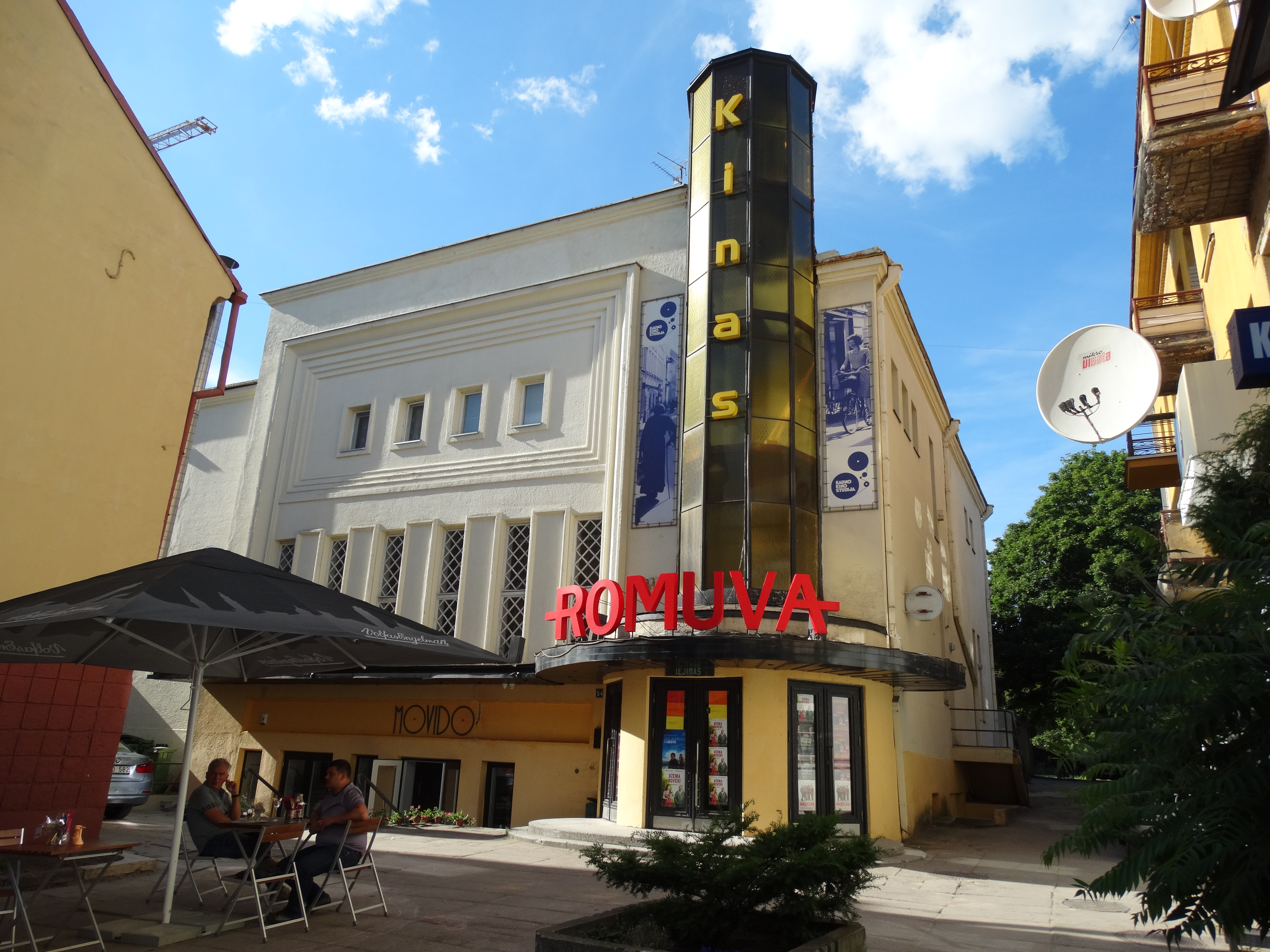
- The Romuva cinema in Kaunas
- Location: Kaunas and Vilnius, Lithuania
- Established: 2007
- Founded by: Visos mūzos
- Most recent: 2020
- Artistic director: Ilona Jurkonytė
- Language: Multiple; subtitles in Lithuanian and English
- Website: Archive of the Official Website https://kinofestivalis.night.lt/lt

Kaunas International Film Festival (Lithuanian: Tarptautinis Kauno kino festivalis) is a film festival founded in 2007 and is held in October each year in Kaunas and Vilnius, Lithuania. The festival specifically celebrates art-house film making but shows indie and internationally acclaimed movies alike, both from and outside of Lithuania. In addition to screenings, many panel discussions, masterclasses, and lectures are offered as part of the festival. The four constant programmes each year are Wide Angle, which explores "contemporary tendencies in the film art"; Identity; Music Moves the World; and All the Muses, which are films focusing on art.

== History ==
The Kaunas International Film Festival was founded in 2007 by organization Visos mūzos. The festival was crucial in preventing developers from turning Lithuania's oldest cinema into a casino. Kaunas International Film Festival countered homogenization of cinema culture in Lithuania. The festival is held in October each year in Kaunas and Vilnius, Lithuania. Kaunas International Film Festival was the first film festival in Lithuania to tour the film programs in the country, such as Panevėžys and Nida. Ilona Jurkonytė is the festival's artistic director and Tomas Tengmark is its programmer.

== Purpose ==
The Kaunas International Film Festival specifically celebrates art-house film making but shows indie and internationally acclaimed movies alike, both from and outside of Lithuania. The festival is associated with the network Eye on Films, which is hosted by Media Mundus, a member of the CICAE network, and the domestic arm of the European Network of Young Cinema NISI MASA. In addition to screenings, many panel discussions, masterclasses, and lectures are offered as part of the festival. Additional programmes change annually, but the four constants are Wide Angle, which explores "contemporary tendencies in the film art"; Identity; Music Moves the World; and All the Muses, which are films focusing on art. The Silver Audience Award Cup was introduced in 2010.

The 2020 festival was held online due to the COVID-19 pandemic and was the first digital festival in Lithuania.

== Years ==
- 2007: September 28 through October 7
  - Films from 32 countries; 1500 attendees
  - Additional programme: "Retrospective: Nouvelle Vague"
  - Audience award: White Palms (Hungarian: Fehér tenyér), directed by Szabolcs Hajdu
- 2008
  - Films from 17 countries; 7000 attendees
  - Additional programmes: Special Focus on Irish Film, "One Hundred Springtimes. Tribute to Vytautas Kernagis", and Train Time
  - Opening film: Love and Other Crimes (Serbian: Ljubav i drugi zločini), directed by Stefan Arsenijević
  - Favorite film: Bliss (Turkish: Mutluluk), directed by Abdullah Oğuz
- 2009: October 1–17
  - Additional programmes: Nordic Sounds in Film
  - Favorite film: Welcome, directed by Philippe Lioret
- 2010: October 1–17
  - Additional programmes: Film retrospectives on Béla Tarr, Deimantas Narkevičius, and Piotr Dumała, Animation, Animated Film (Estonia and Latvia), Best of Slovenian Stop-motion Animation, Elephant Program for Children, Best of Clermont-Ferrand Short Film Festival (European short animation and short film), Special Screenings
  - Opening film: Eastern Drift (Lithuanian: Indigene d'Eurasie), directed by Šarūnas Bartas
  - Silver Audience Award Cup (inaugural): Heartbeats (French: Les amours imaginaires), Xavier Dolan
- 2011: September 27 – October 9
  - Additional programmes: "After a Scene...", "Coming Attractions", "Films of the Golden Period: Slovak New Wave," Red Westerns, "Extended Glimpses", Tribute to Adolfas Mekas, Special screenings: Jonas Mekas Films, Special Screenings: Avant-garde women programme curated by Jonas Mekas
  - Opening film: The Field of Magic (Lithuanian: Stebuklų laukas), directed by Mindaugas Survila
  - Silver Audience Award Cup: How much does your building weigh, Mr. Foster?, directed by Norbert López Amado and Carlos Carcaso
- 2012
  - Silver Audience Award Cup: Narcissus (Limburgish: Narcizas), directed by Dovile Gasiunaite
- 2013: September 25–29
  - 90 films
  - Most popular film: Lore, directed by Cate Shortland
- 2014
  - Favorite film: The Reunion (Swedish: Återträffen), directed by Anna Odell
- 2015: September 30 – October 11
  - Opening film: The Green Musketeers, directed by Jonas Ohman
- 2016: No festival held
- 2017: November 30 – December 13
  - Opening film: Oblivion Verses (Spanish: Los Versos del Olvido), directed by Alireza Khatami
- 2018: September 20–30
- 2019: September 26 – October 6
- 2020: March 19, April 2 (online only)
  - Exhibitions Videograms (Harun Farock)
  - Opening film: Proxima, directed by Alice Winocour
- 2021: No festival due to the COVID-19 pandemic
