= Narcissus (Lemoyne) =

1728 painting by François Lemoyne

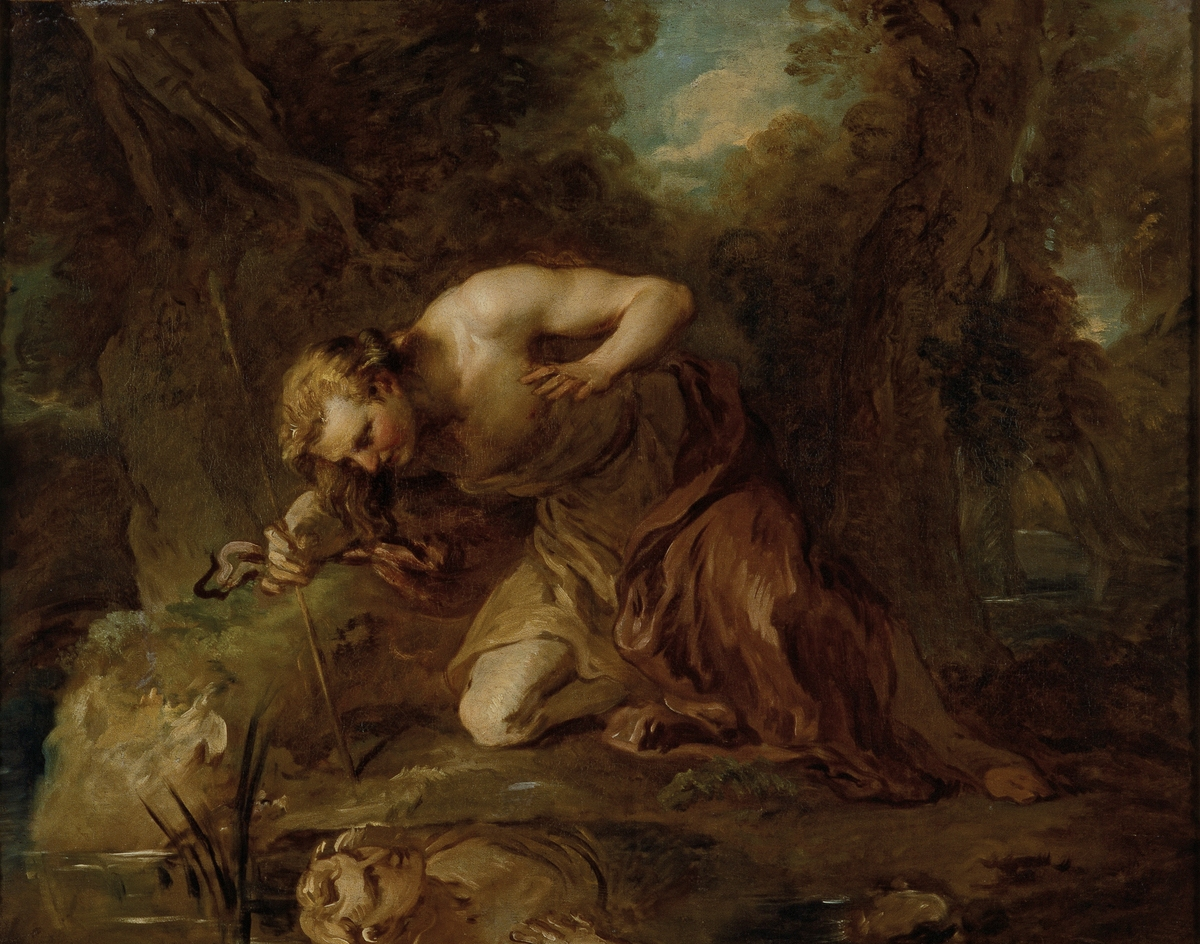
Narcissus (1728) by François Lemoyne

Narcissus is an oil on canvas painting by French artist François Lemoyne, created in 1728, from a series of three works on the myth of Narcissus. It is now in the Museum of Fine Arts of Lyon.

== The painter ==
François Lemoine was born in Paris in 1688 and also died in Paris in 1737 by committing suicide (he stuck a sword in his heart). He is a French Rococo painter from classicism, and was notably the master of the painters François Boucher, Charles-Joseph Natoire and Jean-Jacques Caffieri. He was appointed Premier peintre du Roi by Louis XV, who entrusted him with the renovation of the Salon d'Hercule at the Palace of Versailles.

At age 13, in 1701, he entered the Académie royale de peinture et de sculpture. He studied there under the direction of Louis Galloche and remained there until 1713 despite being excluded from painting classes because of insolence (reinstated after an official apology). Received as a member of the Academy in 1718, he was elected professor there on May 30, 1733.

He painted many religious subjects (he was entrusted with the decoration of the ceiling of the Jacobins church as well as that of Saint-Sulpice) but also mythological. Very inspired by the great Italian masters (Titian, Veronese, Tintoretto, Palma Vecchio, Correggio and others) he wished all his life to become their equal.
