= Narcís =

Narcís or Narcis is a given name. People with the given name include:

- Narcis Bosch, Spanish pornographic film director
- Narcís Casal de Fonsdeviela, Andorran permanent representative to the United Nations in New York City
- Narcís de Carreras (1905–1991), Spanish lawyer and president of FC Barcelona
- Narcis Iustin Ianău (born 1995), Romanian countertenor
- Narcís Jubany Arnau (1913–1996), Spanish Cardinal of the Roman Catholic Church
- Narcís Martí Filosia (born 1945), Spanish footballer
- Narcís Monturiol (1819–1885), Spanish Catalan engineer, artist and intellectual
- Narcís Oller (1846–1930), Spanish Catalan author
- Narcis Răducan (born 1974), former Romanian football player, currently sports director
- Narcís Serra (born 1943), Mayor of Barcelona from 1979 to 1982

== See also ==
- Narciso (disambiguation)
