= Nargess (given name) =

- Gender: Female

Origin
- Origin: Persian

Narges or Nargess (Persian: نرگس) is a Persian female name, as well as the Persian word for flower Narcissus. The narcissus flower is often associated with spring and is celebrated for its delicate beauty and fragrance. The name Nargess translates to "narcissus" or "daffodil" in Persian, which itself comes from the Greek word "Narkissos'', symbolizing beauty and renewal.

== History ==
The name has been featured in various literary works, including the national epic of Persia, the Shahnameh. In Persian literature, poetry, and folklore, poets like Hafez and Saadi have mentioned Nargess in their works.

== List of people with the given name ==
- Nargis Khanum (1943-2017), Pakistani news reporter, writer and journalist
- Narges Abyar (born 1970), an Iranian film director, author, and screenwriter
- Narges Ashtari (born 1988), an Iranian-British founder
- Nargess Eskandari-Grünberg (born 1965), an Iranian-German politician
- Narges Kalhor (born 1984), Iranian film director
- Narges Mohammadi (born 1972), an Iranian human rights activist
- Narges Rashidi (born 1980), a German-Iranian actress
- Narges Witt, an alias for Monica Witt (born 1979), a former US contractor who defected to Iran
- Nargess, a character in the Iranian film Nargess
- Nargis (1929-1981), Indian actress
