= San Narciso =

San Narciso (Spanish for "Saint Narcissus") is the name of two places in the Philippines:

- San Narciso, Quezon
- San Narciso, Zambales

In other uses

- San Narciso, Belize
- San Narciso, a fictional Californian city in Thomas Pynchon's The Crying of Lot 49
- 1867 San Narciso Hurricane, the costliest and deadliest storm of the 1867 Atlantic hurricane season
