= François Lemoyne =

French painter (1688–1737)

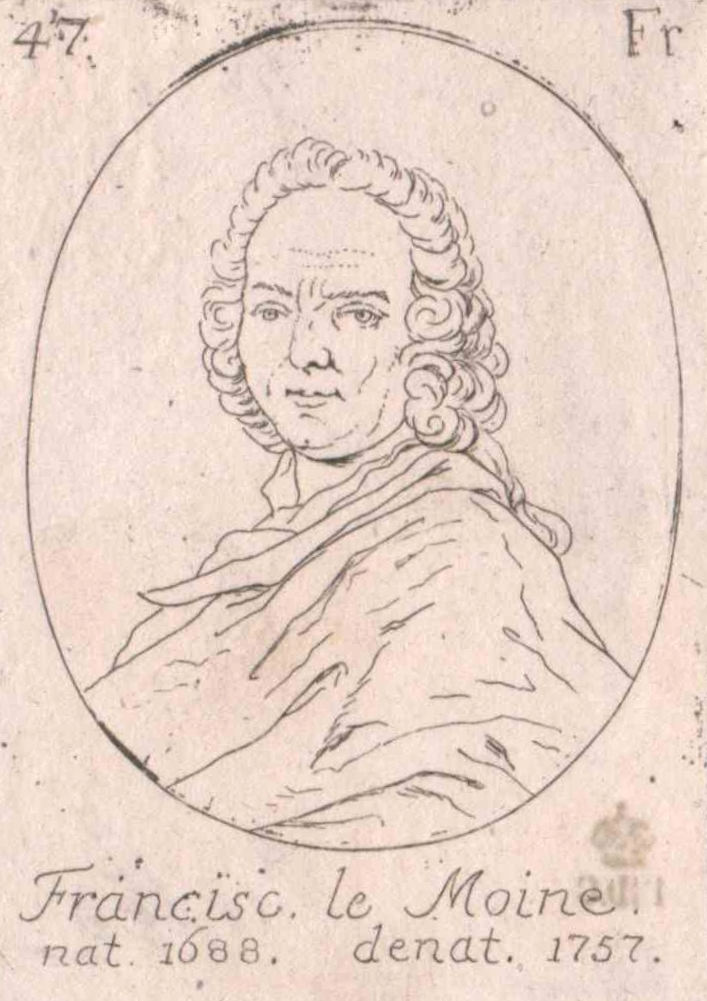
- Born: 1688; Paris, France
- Died: 4 June 1737 (aged 48–49)
- Education: Académie de peinture et de sculpture
- Known for: Painting
- Movement: Rococo

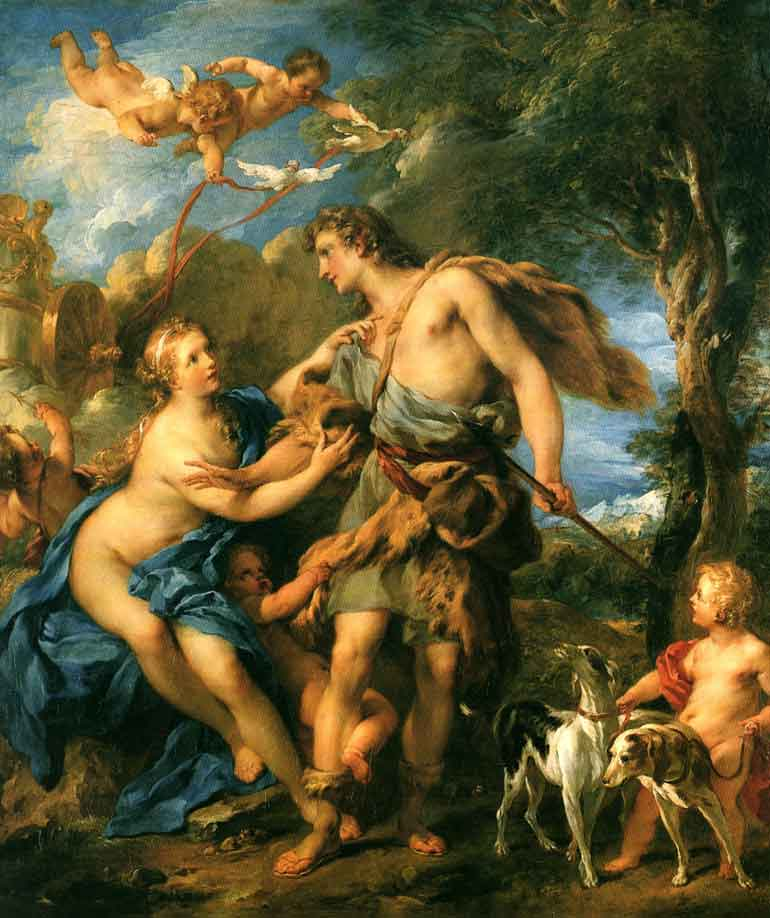
Venus and Adonis, 1729, Nationalmuseum

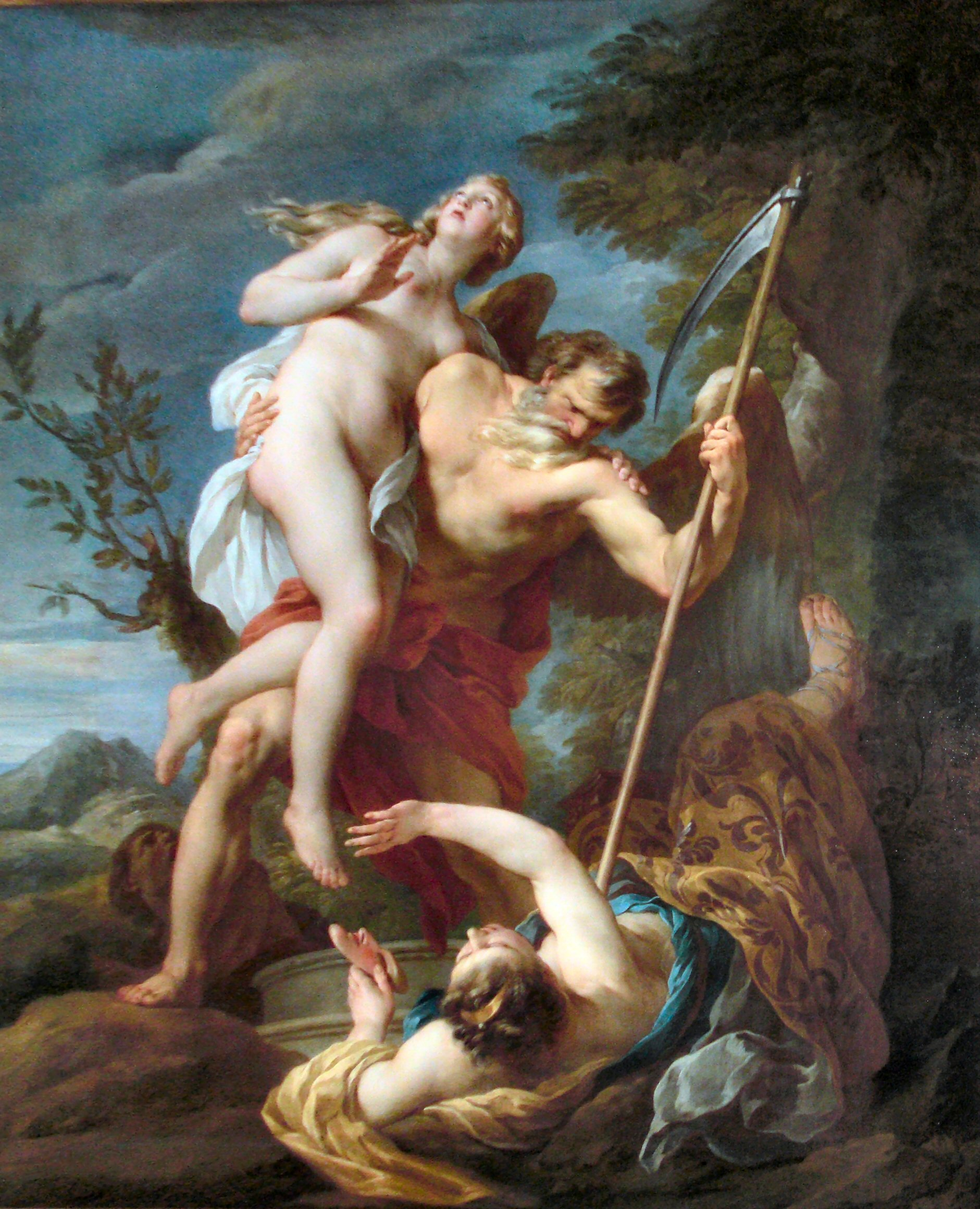
Time Saving Truth from Falsehood and Envy (1737) Completed on the day before the artist's suicide.

François Lemoyne or François Le Moine (French: [fʁɑ̃swa ləmwan]; 1688 – 4 June 1737) was a French rococo painter. He was a winner of the Prix de Rome, professor of the Académie royale de peinture et de sculpture, and Premier peintre du Roi to Louis XV. He was tutor to Charles-Joseph Natoire and François Boucher.

Throughout his career, Lemoyne sought to be seen as the heir to Charles Le Brun and the leading painter of his generation, titles also vied for by his rival Jean-François de Troy (1679–1752). Lemoyne's work and talent, notably plied in Versailles, earned him the esteem of his contemporaries and the name of the "new Le Brun". He collaborated with or worked alongside other artists of the era, including Donat Nonnotte, Gilles Dutilleul, Charles de La Fosse, and Coypel. He killed himself in 1737, at the height of his career. With his death, the fashion of large allegorical ceilings disappeared.

== Biography ==
Lemoyne was born in Paris in 1688 and studied under Louis Galloche until 1713. In 1711, Lemoyne won the Prix de Rome and travelled to Italy to continue his studies. After his return to Paris, Lemoyne was accepted as a full member of the Académie de peinture et de sculpture in 1718 and later elected as a professor in 1733. In 1723, Lemoyne returned to Italy for a second trip.

In 1727, the duc d'Antin (Louis-Antoine de Pardaillan de Grondin), serving as the director of the Bâtiments du Roi, held an art competition in the hopes of reviving history painting among members of the Académie. Only one Salon had been held since 1704 (in 1725), so this offered a rare opportunity for public exhibition of paintings. Twelve paintings were submitted in all, by artists including Charles-Antoine Coypel and Noel-Nicholas Coypel. Opinion was widely divided, with critical opinion favoring the paintings by the two Coypels, but in the end the first place prize of 5,000 livres was jointly awarded to Lemoyne and de Troy, a compromise which frustrated them both.

In 1728, Lemoyne was awarded a royal commission to paint the ceiling of the Salon d’Hercule at Versailles, which he worked on from 1733 to 1736. He had seen similar paintings in Italy (such as Pietro da Cortona’s in the Palazzo Barberini), and sought to prove that the French could excel at à ciel ouvert as much as the Italians. When the work was complete, he received "unanimous praise," including accolades from Voltaire and Cardinal Fleury. His career was at its peak in 1736, when he was appointed Premier peintre du Roi.

The following year, 1737, Lemoyne committed suicide in Paris. The reasons for this are not known, though excess of work, court intrigue at Versailles, the death of his wife, temperamental instability, and frustration at his inability to attain artistic perfection have been submitted. He chose death by sword, stabbing himself a total of nine times in the chest and throat. This was six months after finishing the ceiling painting "L'apothéose d'Hercule" in the Salon d'Hercule in the grand appartement du roi, and the day after completing the painting Time Saving Truth from Falsehood and Envy for his friend and patron François Berger.

Lemoyne has been characterized by David Wakefield as "industrious, painstaking and serious."

== Style ==
Lemoyne's early studies in Rome instilled in him knowledge of the works of the Old Masters, Raphael, Correggio, and Titian, though his strongest influence was undoubtedly Rubens (particularly in his use of color). During his second trip in 1723, Lemoyne admired the ceiling of the Palazzo Barberini and found inspiration in the works of the Venetians, particularly Paolo Veronese. Over the course of his career, Lemoyne's style shifted more in favor of the Italian influence.

Pierre Rosenberg describes Lemoyne's style as "refined and introverted." Philip Conisbee refers to Lemoyne's paintings as having a "sensuous beauty" similar to works by Correggio.

== Works ==
- Ruth and Booz (1711), the painting he won the Prix de Rome with.
- St Jean dans le Désert, in Nantes Cathedral.
- Hercules and Cacus (1718)
- Tancred Surrendering Arms to Clorinda (1722), commissioned by Berger.
- Perseus and Andromeda (1723), currently at the Wallace Collection, London.
- Hercules and Omphale (1724), currently in the Louvre, Paris.
- Continence of Scipio (1727), the painting he displayed at the 1727 competition.
- Louis XV donnant la Paix à l'Europe, Salon de la Paix in Versailles (1727)
- The Annunciation (1727), at Winchester College, previously on loan to the National Gallery
- Narcissus (1728)
- Venus and Adonis (1729)
- Ceiling of the Salon d'Hercule in Versailles (1736)
- Arch of the Church of Saint-Thomas-d'Aquin in Paris
- Diane chasseresse
- Les Nymphes
- He also worked at Saint-Sulpice and at the Abbey of Saint-Germain-des-Prés
- Time Saving Truth from Falsehood and Envy (1737), currently at the Wallace Collection, London.

== Bibliography ==
- Cours sur la peinture du XVIII^{e}, 2006, Université Nancy 2
- Xavier Salmon : François Lemoyne à Versailles, Gourcuff, Paris 2001, ISBN 2-909838-57-9
- Jean-Luc Bordeaux, Francois Le Moyne ( 1688–1737) and His Generations, published in 1984-1985 jointly by the Getty Trust and the Louvre Arthena. ( reviewed by the late Philip Conisbee in the Burlington Magazine in 1985.
