= Saint-Narcisse (disambiguation) =

Saint-Narcisse is a parish in Quebec, Canada.

Saint-Narcisse may also refer to:

- Saint-Narcisse-de-Beaurivage, a parish in Quebec
- Saint-Narcisse-de-Rimouski, a parish in Quebec
- Saint-Narcisse (film), a 2020 film directed by Bruce LaBruce

== See also ==
- Narcisse (disambiguation)
- Saint Narcissus (disambiguation)
