= Perseus and Andromeda (Lemoyne) =

1732 painting by François Lemoyne

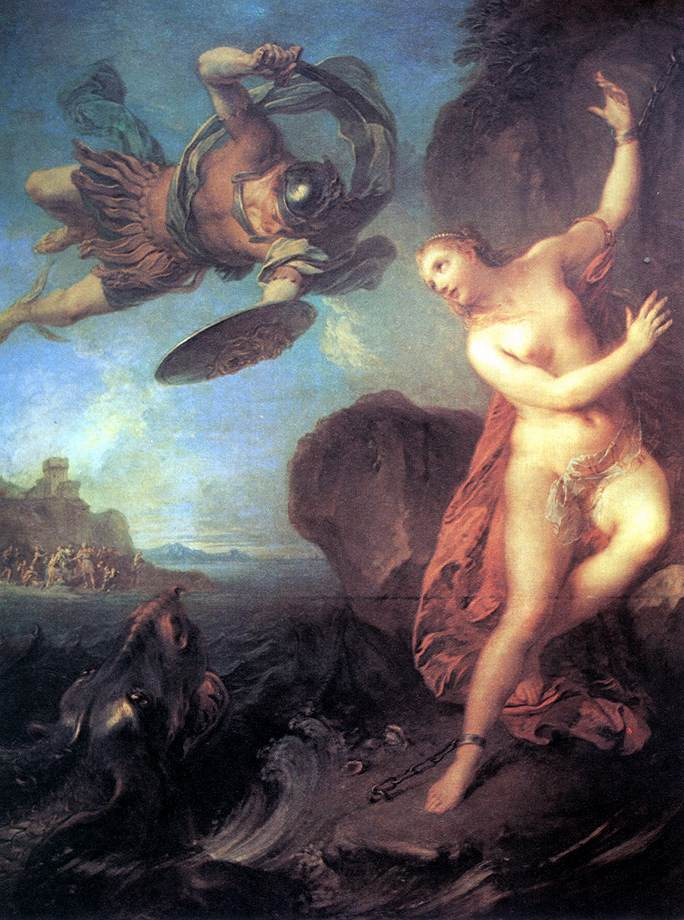
Perseus and Andromeda (1723) by François Lemoyne

Perseus and Andromeda is a 1723 oil on canvas painting by the French artist François Lemoyne (1688-1737), measuring 184 by 151 cm. It is now in the Wallace Collection in London, which also houses Titian's version of the same subject, whose composition Lemoyne borrowed and reversed for his work.

It depicts Andromeda's rescue by Perseus as told in Book IV of Ovid's Metamorphoses. According to Donat Nonnotte, the painting's first owner was François Berger.

== Analysis ==
=== Topic ===
The painting presents the mythological theme of Perseus and Andromeda, inspired by Ovid's Metamorphoses (Book IV). The scene takes place in Ethiopia. Andromeda's mother, Cassiopeia, Queen of Ethiopia, proclaims that her daughter is fairer than all the sea nymphs, the Nereids. This affront provokes the wrath of Poseidon, god of the sea, who decides to send a sea monster to ravage the country. After consulting the oracle of Ammon, the king, Cepheus, decides to offer his daughter to the monster in order to stop the disaster. Perseus, returning from his victory over the gorgon Medusa, sees Andromeda, chained naked to a rock on the edge of the shore. Falling instantly in love with the princess, he promises Cepheus to kill the sea monster on the condition that he marry Andromeda. Perseus then attacks the monster with his curved sword and kills him.

Indeed, Andromeda tied to a rock is about to be devoured by a sea monster. Perseus, suspended in the air, will bring down his sword on the monster. In the distance, on the other side, people witness the scene, probably too far away to know who will emerge victorious.

=== Composition ===
An important dynamism emerges from this table. First, the rectangular format of the canvas echoes the verticality of Andromeda's gesture, which extends the left arm. Also, the sea monster, bottom left, is truncated. This then invites the viewer to imagine beyond the painting and introduces dynamism into the scene. We are indeed faced with the representation of a snapshot, the movement is caught on the spot. The respective feet of Perseus and Andromeda frame the monster, which accentuates its weak position. In addition, Perseus and Andromeda have their right arm and left arm raised respectively, which accentuates the verticality of the canvas. Moreover, Andromeda's left arm espouses the curved movement of Perseus' drapery. Finally, the eye games are important given that Andromeda looks at Perseus, who looks at the monster, who looks at Perseus. This last exchange of glances gives tension to the scene.

=== Aesthetic ===
François Lemoyne was inspired by Venetian painters, such as Titian, and this painting reverses the composition of Titian's Perseus and Andromeda (1554, 175 × 189 cm, Wallace Collection, London).
