= Nargis (disambiguation) =

Nargis (1929–1981) was an Indian actress.

Nargis may also refer to:

== People ==
- Nargis (Pakistani actress) (born 1976), Pakistani actress
- Nargis Akhter, Bangladeshi director, screenwriter and producer
- Nargis Ali (born 1965), Pakistani politician
- Nargis Begum (born 1965), Bengali politician
- Nargis Bagheri (born 1984), Indian actress and singer
- Nargis Bandishoeva, Tajikistani singer
- Nargis Hameedullah (born 1998), Pakistani karateka
- Nargis Faiz Malik, Pakistani politician
- Nargis Fakhri (born 1979), American model and actress
- Nargis Nabieva, (born 1985), Tajikistani singer
- Nargis Nehan (born 1981), Afghan politician
- Nargis Rabadi, Indian actress
- Nargis Rasheed, Pakistani actress
- Nargis Sethi, Pakistani civil service officer
- Nargiz Zakirova (born 1970), Russian rock singer

== Other uses ==
- Nargis, Loiret, commune in the Loiret department in north-central France
- Cyclone Nargis, cyclone which devastated the Irrawaddy Delta and the city of Yangon in 2008
- Narcissus poeticus, a flower also known as "Nargis"
- Nargis (film), a 1946 Bollywood film starring the Indian actress

== See also ==
- Narcissus (disambiguation)
