= Saint Narcissus =

Saint Narcissus may refer to:

- Narcissus of Athens, apostle
- Narcissus, Argeus, and Marcellinus (died 320), martyrs
- Narcissus of Jerusalem (99–216), bishop of Jerusalem
- Bishop Narcissus of Girona, who converted Saint Afra (4th century)

== See also ==
- Saint-Narcisse (disambiguation)
- San Narciso (disambiguation)
