= Narcisa =

Narcisa may refer to:

== People with thec given name ==
- Narcisa de Jesús (1832–1869), Roman Catholic saint from Nobol, Ecuador
- Narcisa de León (1877–1966), Filipino film producer
- Narcisa Freixas (1859–1926), Catalan sculptor, painter and composer
- Narcisa Lecușanu (born 1979), retired Romanian handball player
- Narcisa Pérez Reoyo (1849–1876), Spanish writer

== Other uses ==
- Narcisa (beetle), a genus in the tribe Gymnochilini

== See also ==
- Narcissa (disambiguation)
