= Narcisse =

Narcisse can be both a given name and surname. Notable people with the name include:

== Given name ==
- Narcisse Bambara (born 1989), Burkinabé footballer
- Narcisse Blais (1812–1888), Canadian farmer and political figure in Quebec
- Narcisse Bonan (born 1984), Ivorian footballer
- Narcisse Chaillou (1835–1916), French painter
- Narcisse Ekanga (born 1987), Cameroonian-born Equatoguinean footballer
- Narcisse Ewodo (born 1972), Cameroonian-French basketball player
- Narcisse Fish Abada (born 1982), Cameroonian footballer
- Narcisse Fournier (1809–1880), French journalist, novelist and playwright
- Narcisse Girard (1797–1860), French violinist, conductor and composer
- Narcisse Leven (1833–1915), French lawyer
- Narcisse Théophile Patouillard (1854–1926), French pharmacist and mycologist
- Narcisse Parant (1794–1842), French lawyer and Minister of Public Education
- Narcisse Pelletier (1844–1894), French cabin boy who spent 17 years living amongst the Uutaalnganu people following a shipwreck
- Narcisse Pérodeau (1851–1932), fourteenth Lieutenant-Governor of Quebec
- Narcisse Virgilio Díaz (1807–1876), French painter
- Narcisse Yaméogo (born 1980), Burkinabé footballer

== Surname ==
- Antonio Narcisse (born 1982), American football player
- Clairvius Narcisse (1922–1994), Haitian man said to have been turned into a living zombie
- Daniel Narcisse (born 1979), French handball player
- Don Narcisse (born 1965), Canadian football wide receiver
- Evan Narcisse, American writer and journalist

== Other uses ==
- Narcisse (film), a 1940 French comedy film

== See also ==
- Narcissus (plant)
- Joseph-Narcisse
- Narcisse-Achille
- Narcisse-Fortunat
- Pierre-Narcisse
- Saint-Narcisse (disambiguation)
