= Narciss =

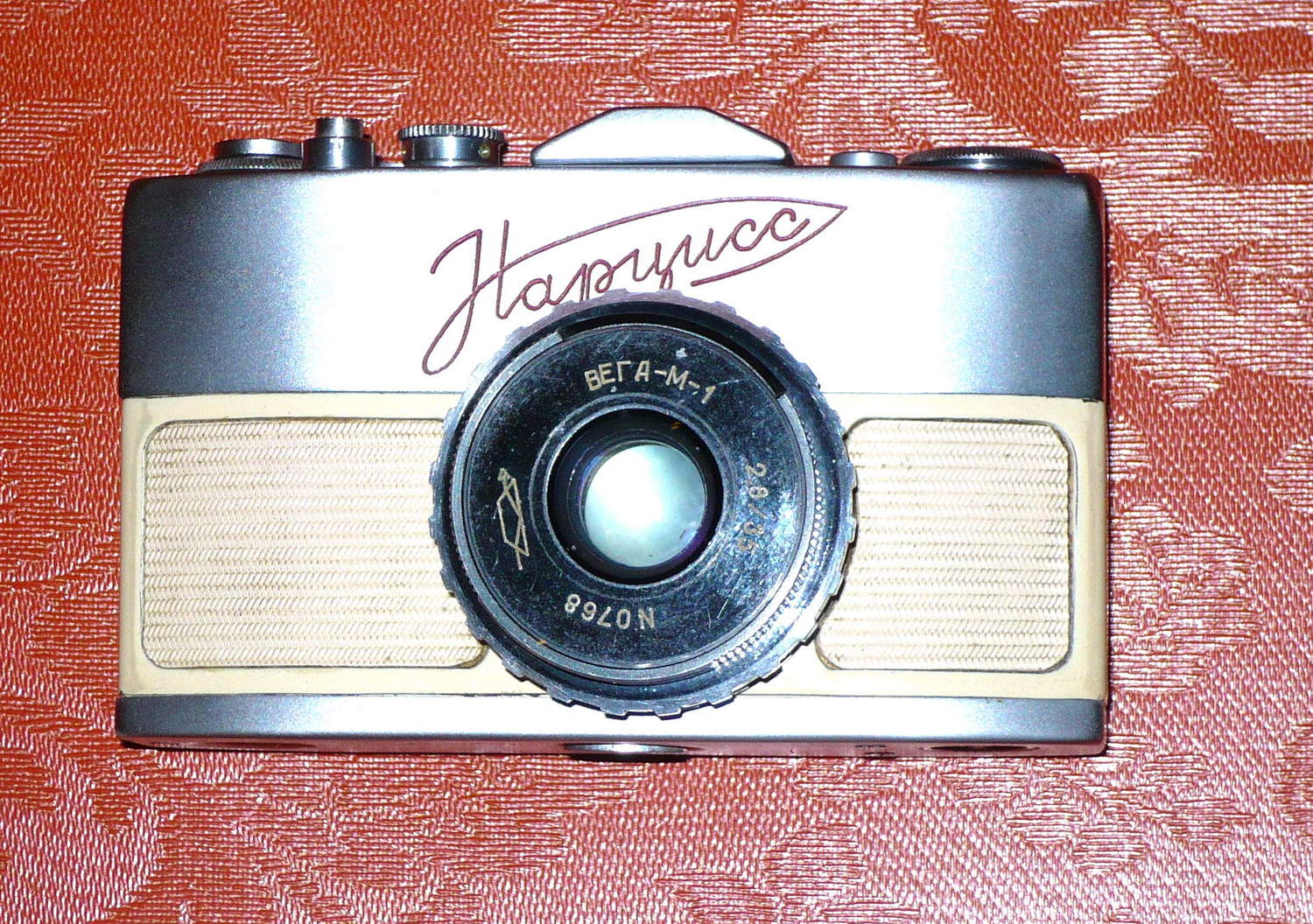
1964 White Narciss camera

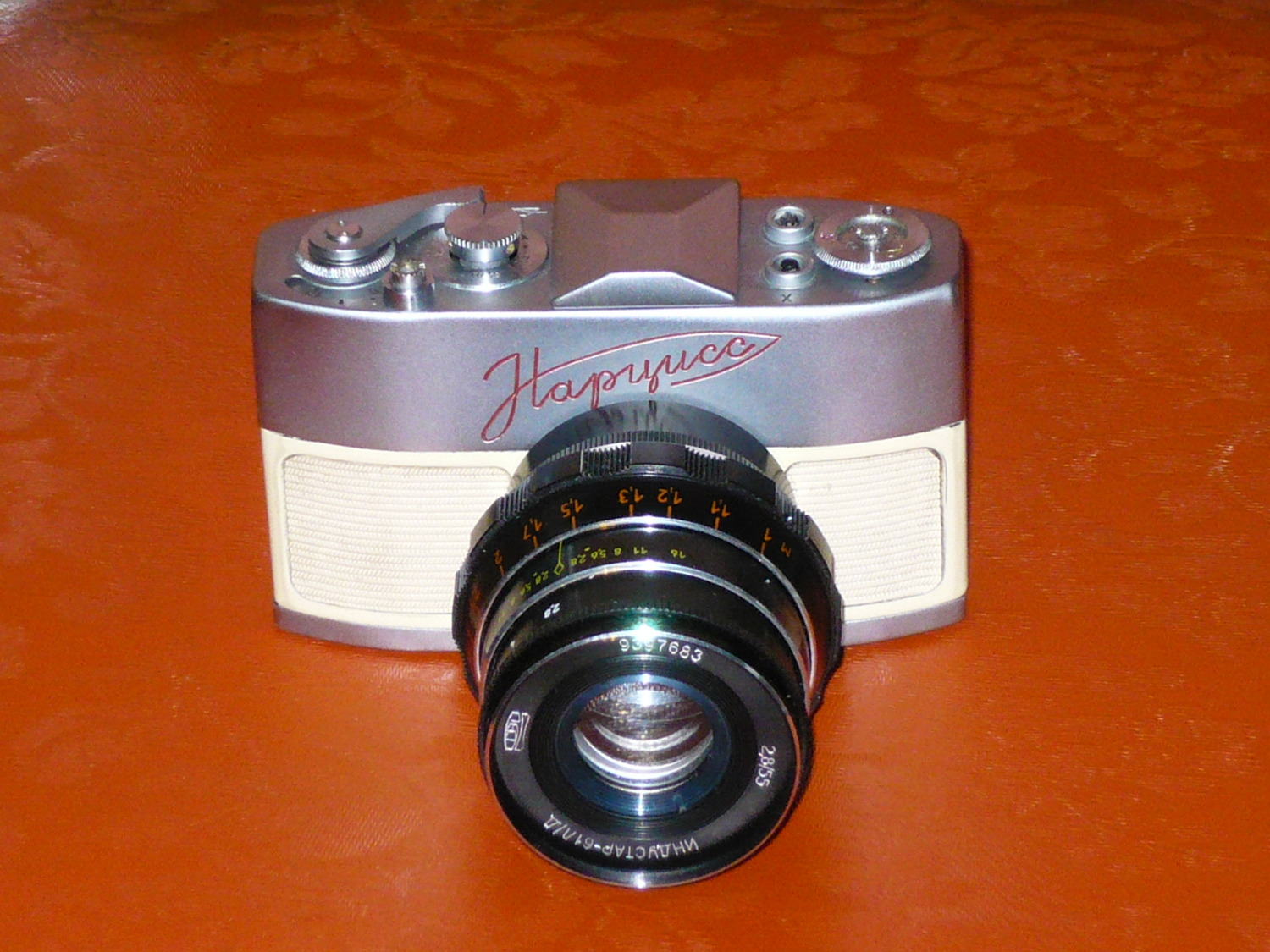
Narciss with Industar-61 L/D 55 mm/2.8 lens

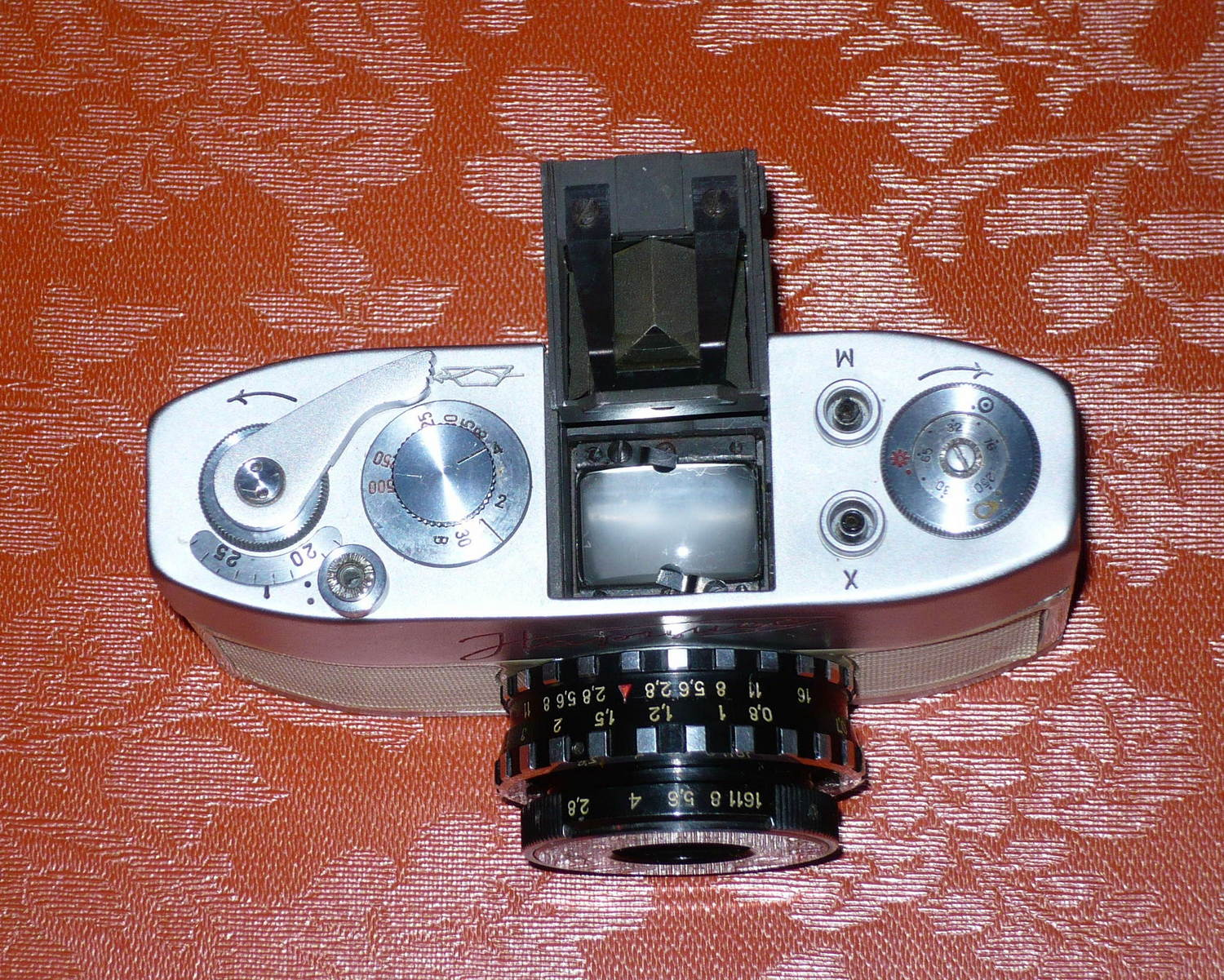
Narciss with Industar-61 L/D 55 mm/2.8 lens

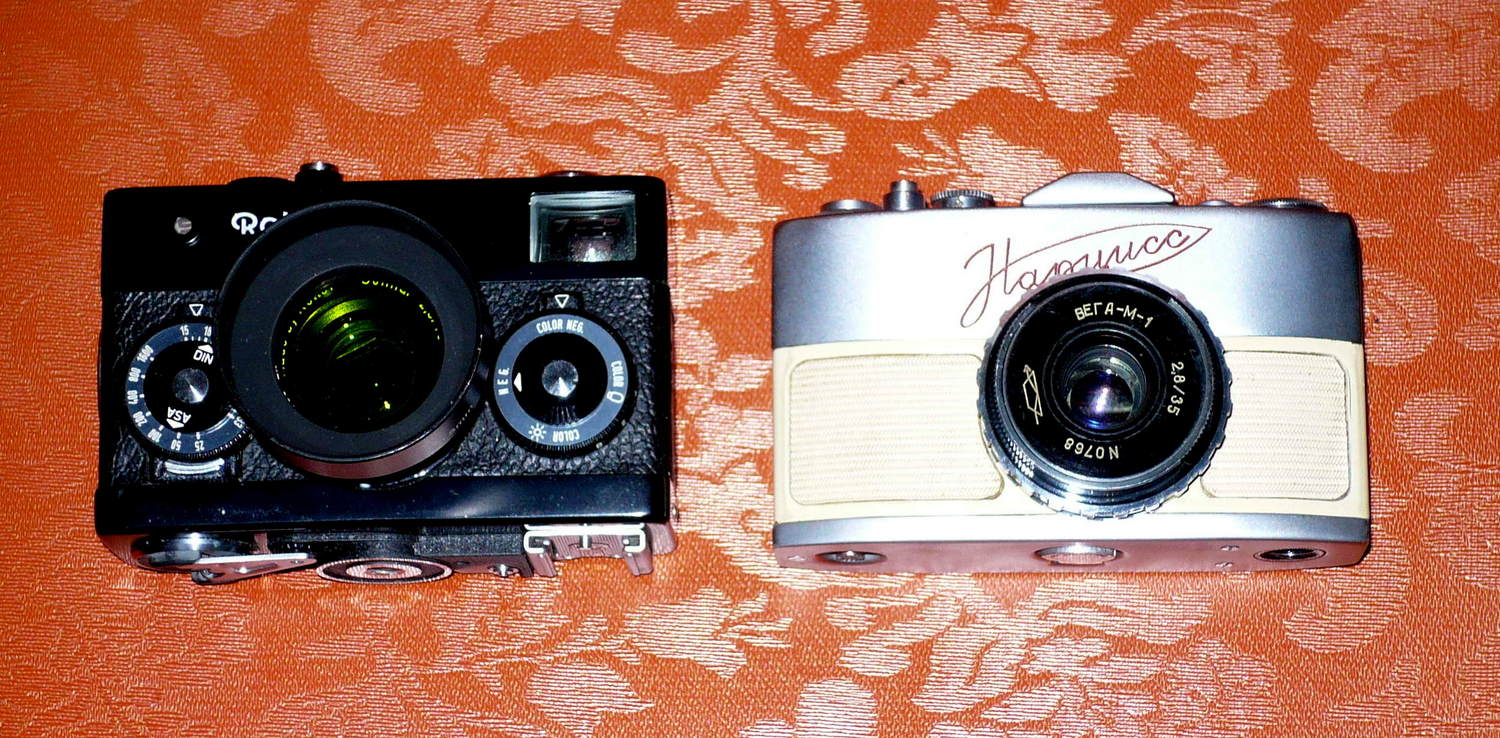
Narciss and Rollei 35S

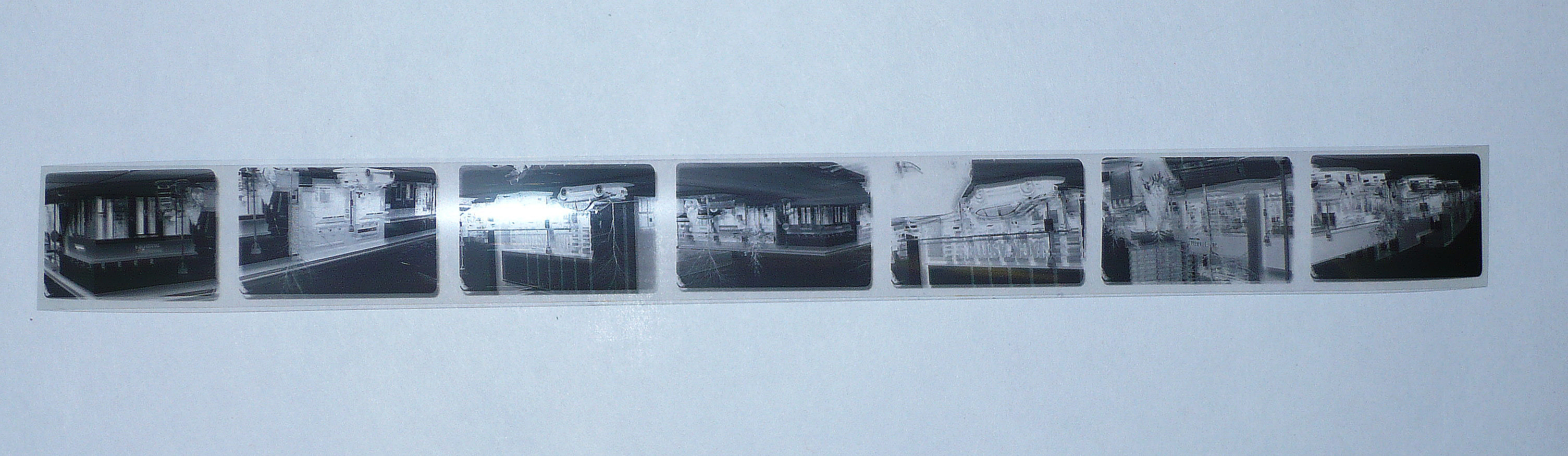
Naciss 16 mm SLR negative

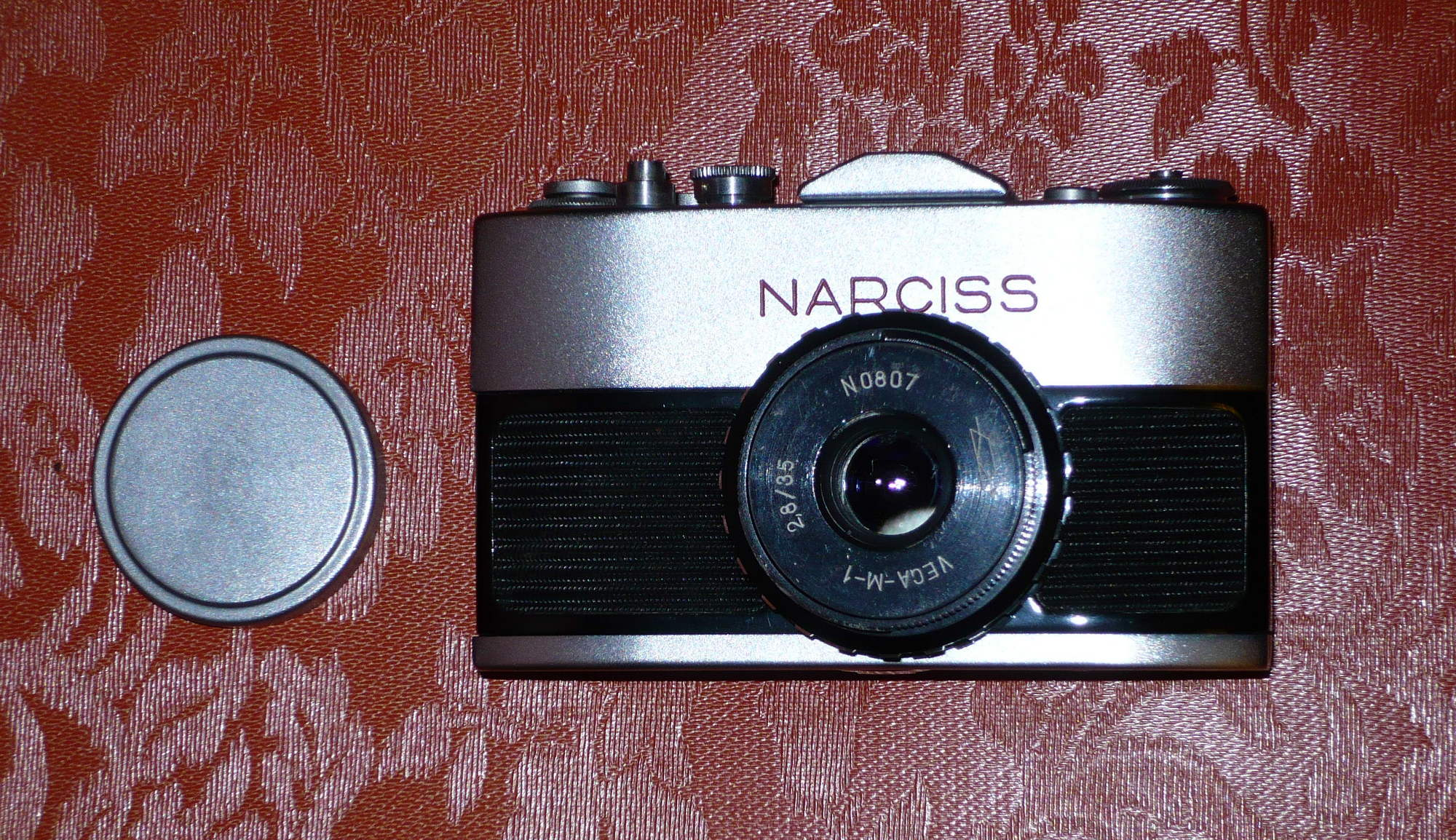
Black Narciss camera with English name plate

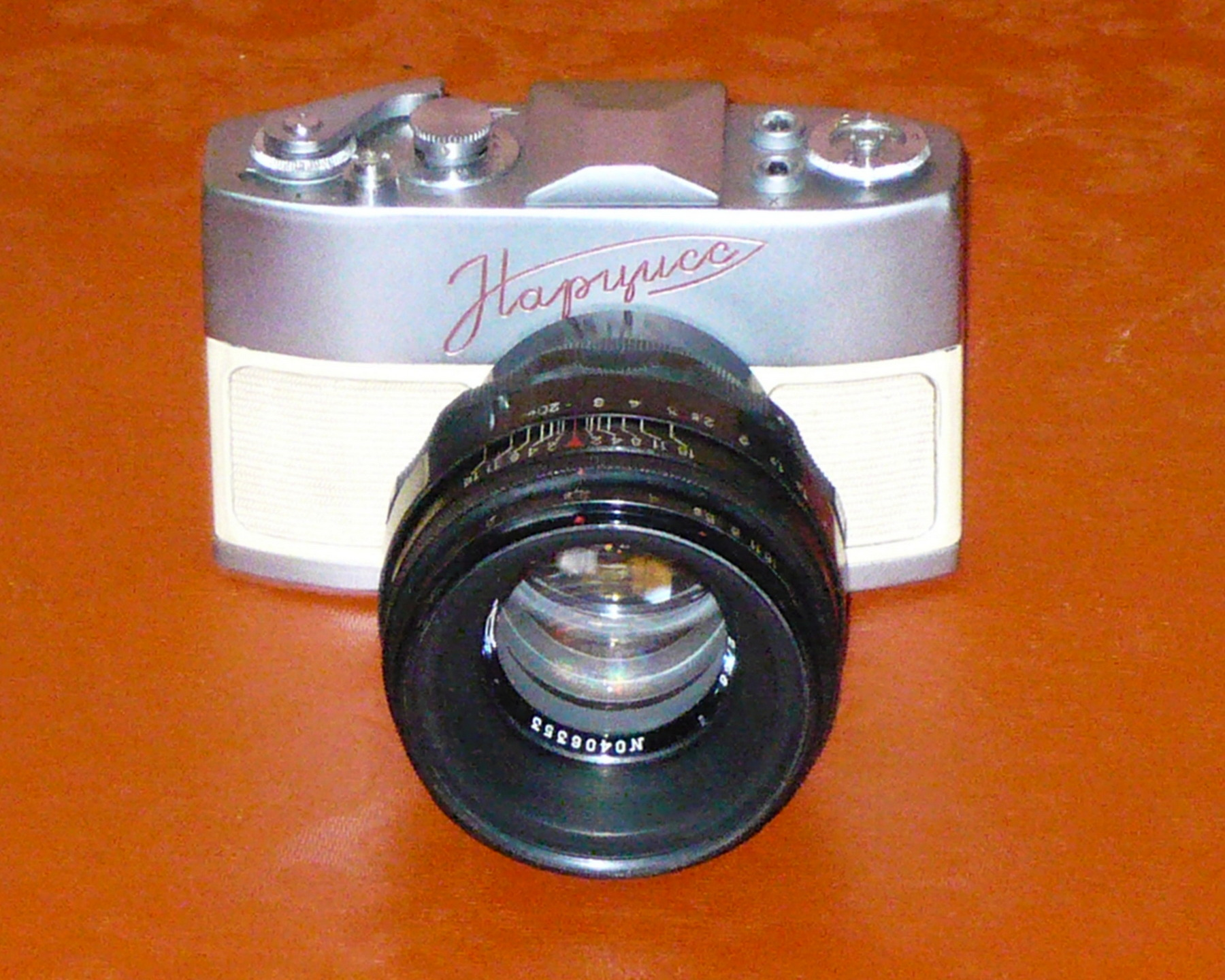
Narciss w Zenit M39 Helio-44 58 mm F2 lens

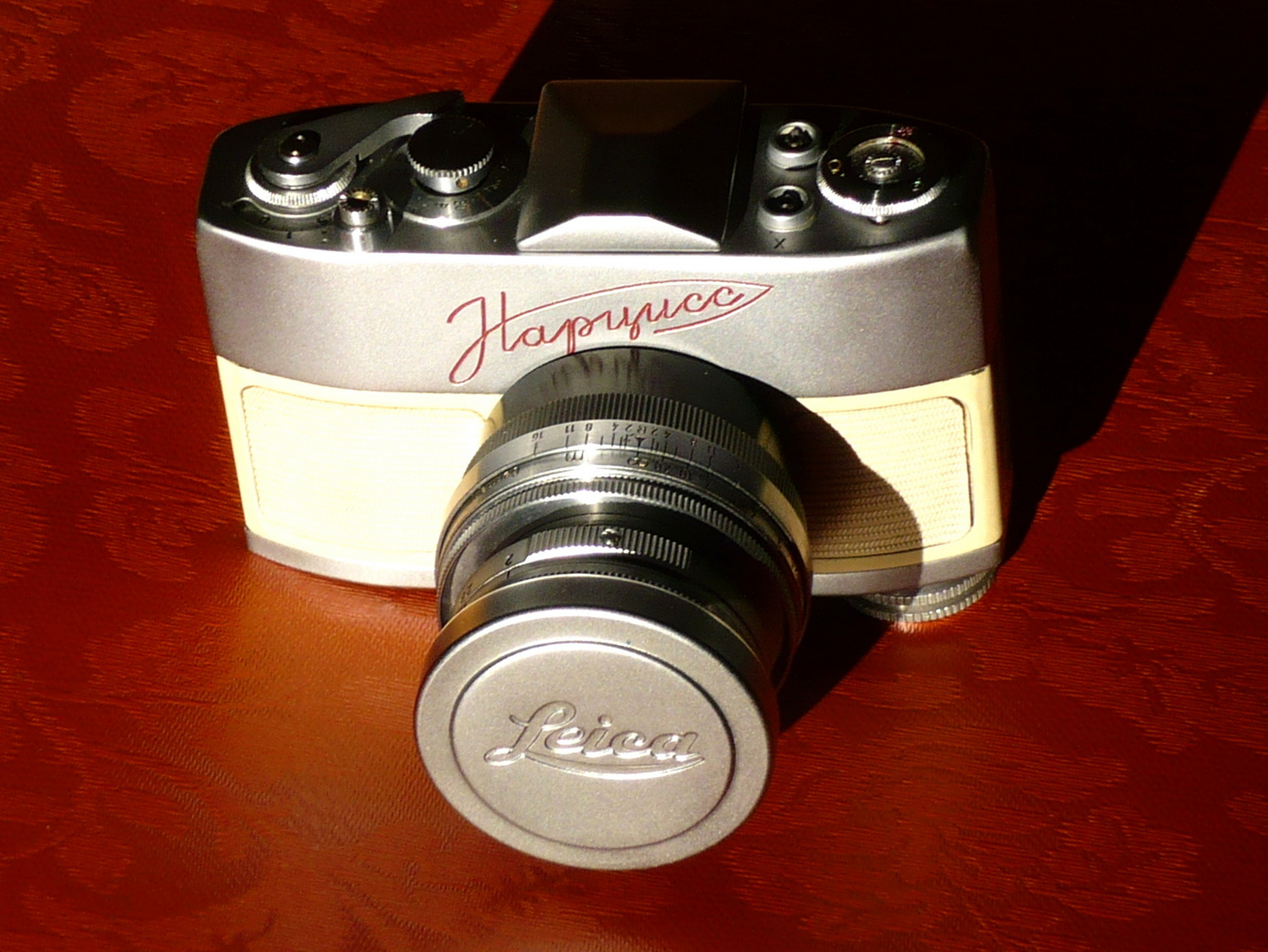
Narciss with Leitz Summitar 50 mm F2 lens

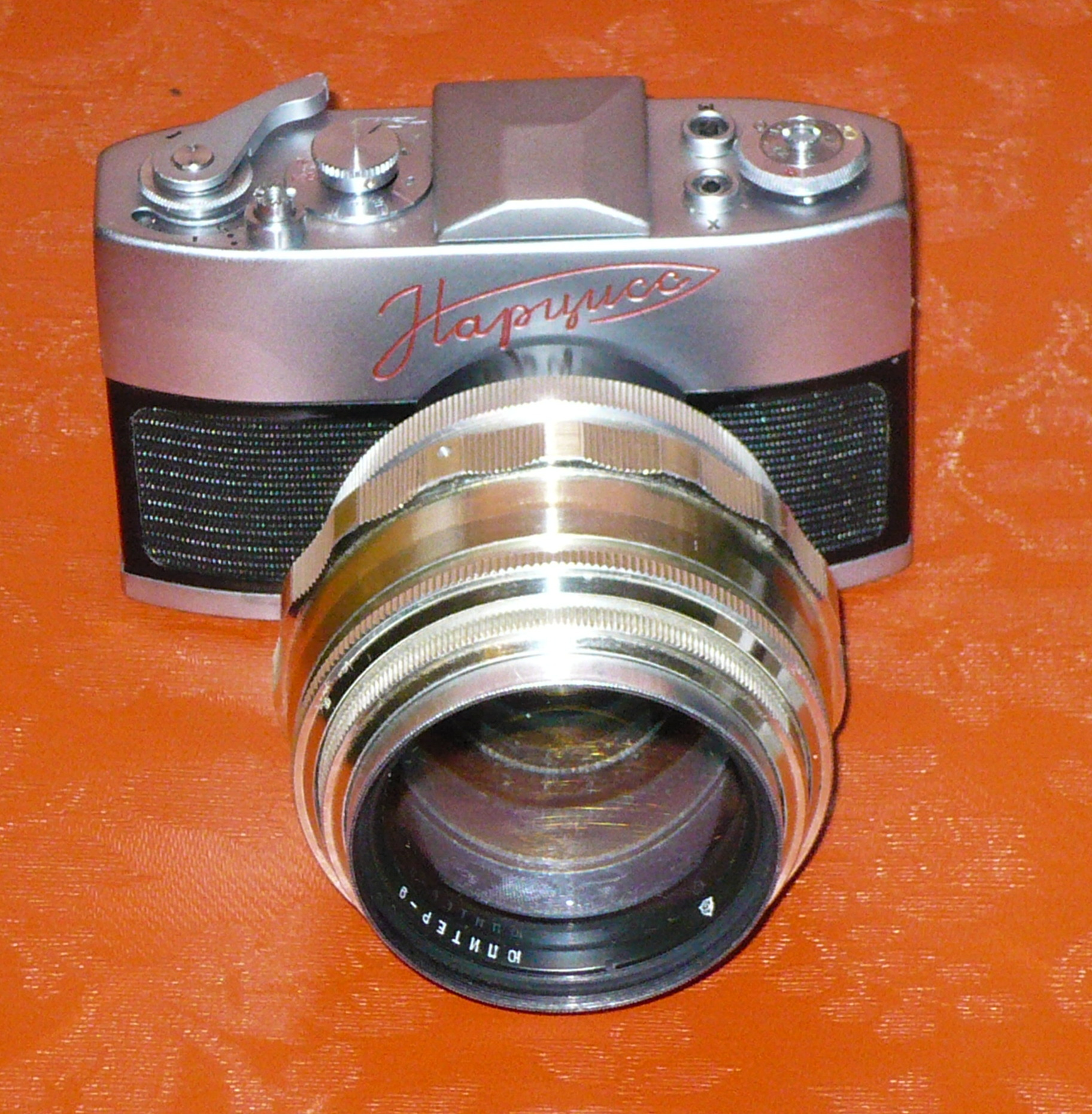
Narciss with Jupiter-9 85 mm/2

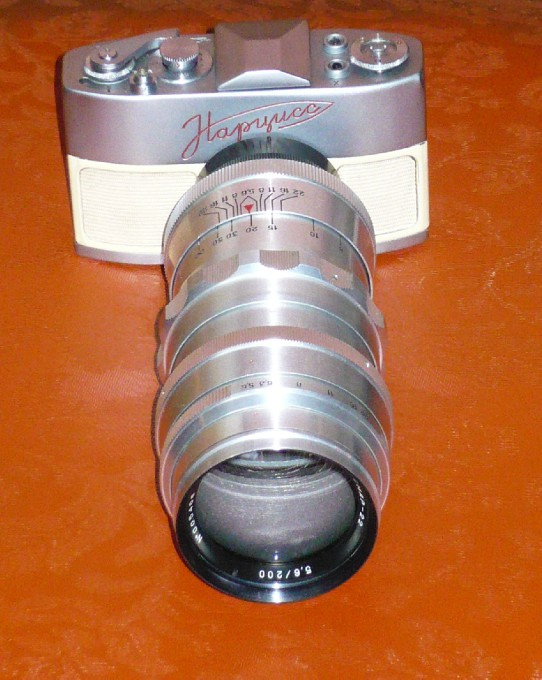
Telemar 200 mm/5.6

The Narciss is an all-metal 16 mm subminiature single lens reflex camera made by Russian optic firm Krasnogorsky Mekhanichesky Zavod (KMZ) Narciss (Soviet Union; Нарцисс) between 1961 and 1965. It is the first subminiature SLR. It took 25 14×21 mm frames using unperforated specially spooled 16 mm film in a Narciss cassette. Compact design with interchangeable lenses and interchangeable pentaprism finders. The Narciss camera was initially designed for medical use, it included a Narciss with ordinary pentaprism finder and a second magnifier pentaprism finder for medical use; there was also a microscope adapter

It has a focal plane cloth shutter, with speeds B, 1/30, 1/2, 1/4, 1/8, 1/15, 1/60, 1/125, 1/250 and 1/500 sec. Change shutter speed only after shutter cocked

Dimension: 100 mm × 64 mm × 32 mm (3.9 in × 2.5 in × 1.3 in) – similar to the Rollei 35s in size)

Weight: 320 g (11 oz) – lighter than the Rollei 35s at 370 g (13 oz)

Tripod socket: 3/8 inch

The standard lens is a four-element three-group Tessar type lens: Vega 35 mm/2.8, there are also 5-element 4-group MIR5 28/2.8, MIR6 28/2, and JUPITER 50/2.

An early model of the Narciss is equipped with Industar-60 35 mm/2.8 lens.

Three models were available; the most common was the chrome-top black-body model, rarer was the chrome-top white-body model, and the extremely rare grey-top model.

Accessories: Genuine leather case, microscope adapter, M24 lens mount to M39 lens mount adapter for Zenit SLR lenses, with flange to film plane distance of 45.2 mm. M39 LTM mount with flange to film plane distance 28.8 mm not applicable.

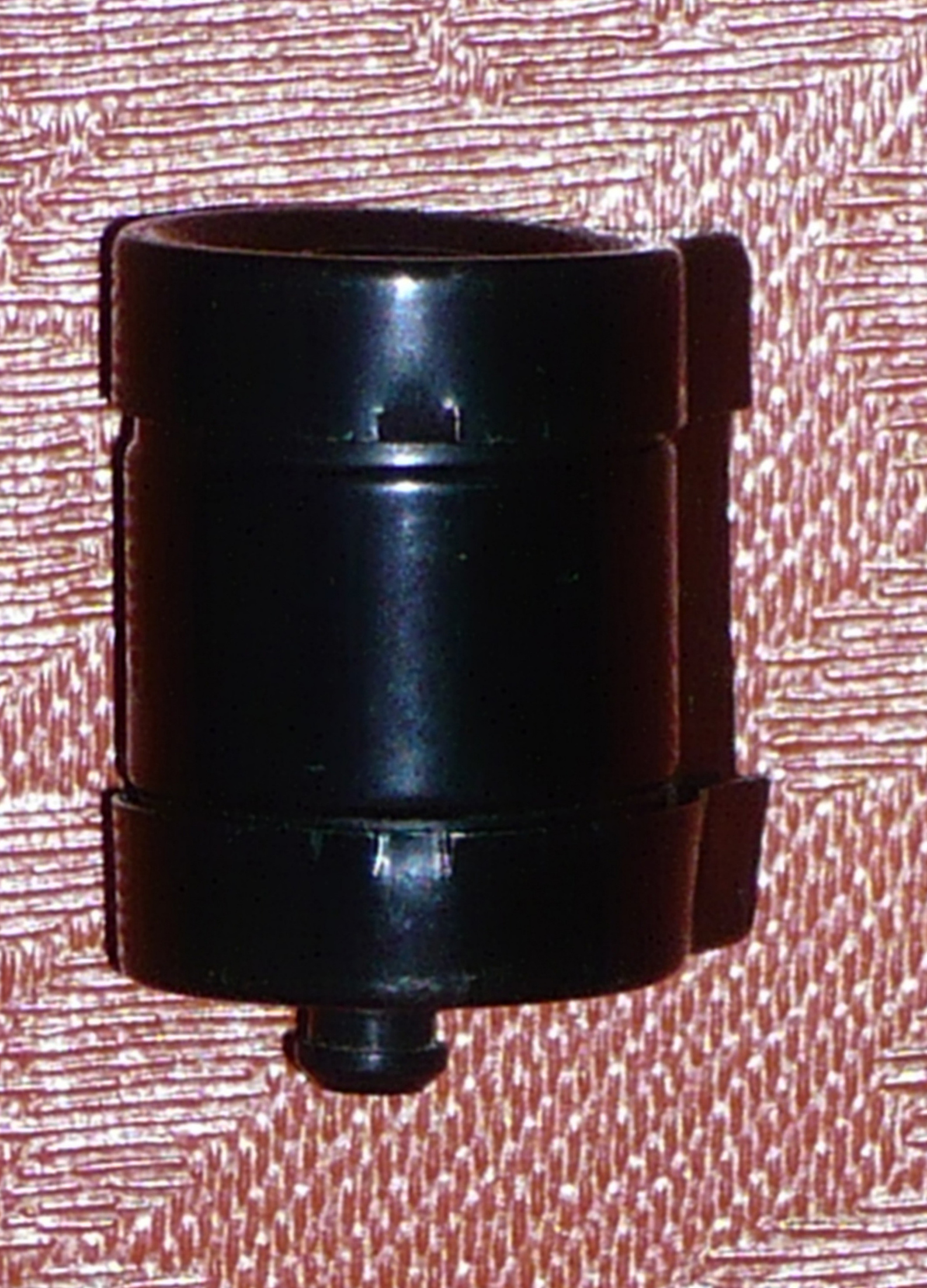
Narciss camera 16mm film cassette
