= Salon d'Hercule =

State room in the Château de Versailles

Hercules Drawing Room (Salon d'Hercule)
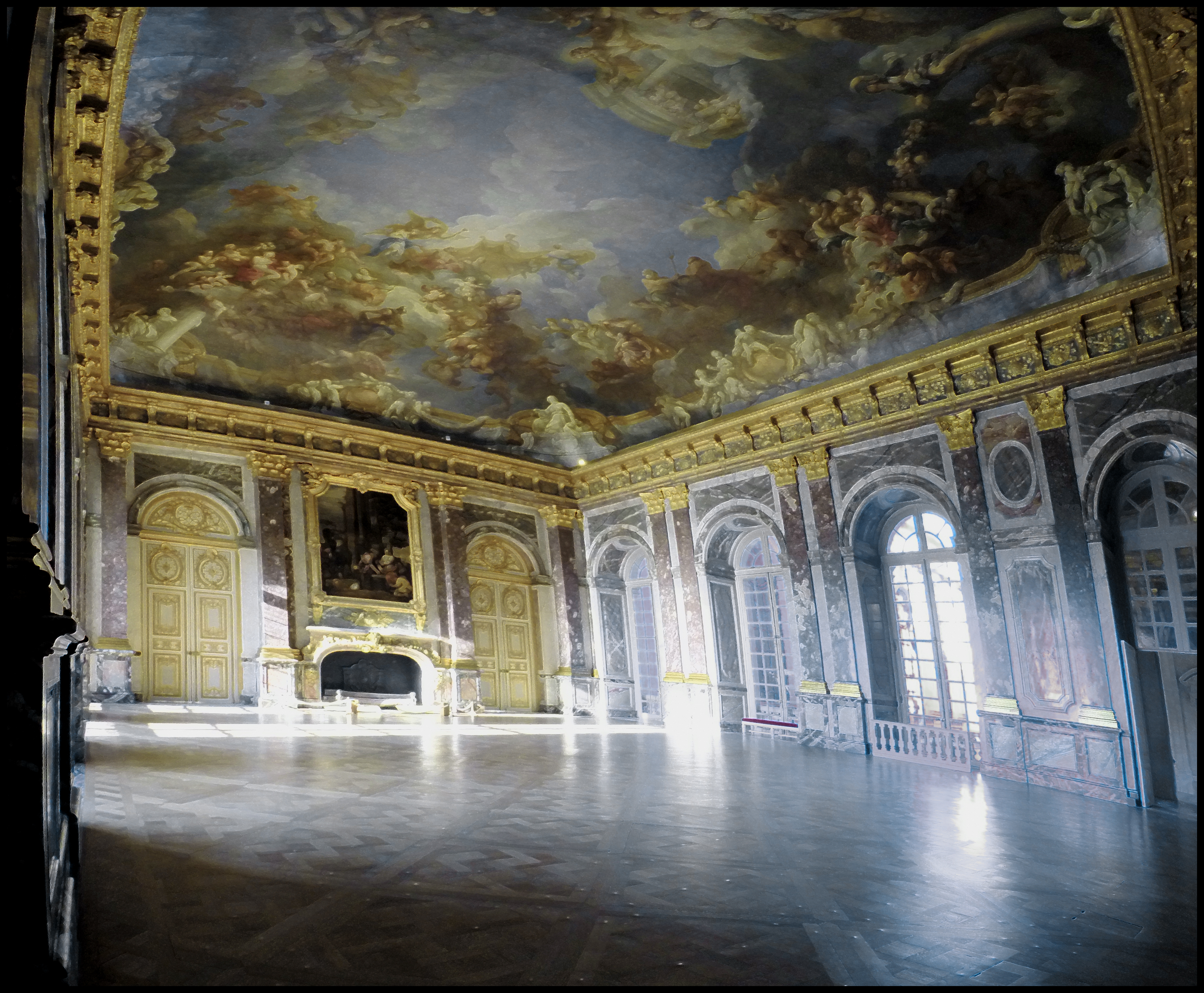
- Created 1724–1736 by Robert de Cotte, Jacques Gabriel, Antoine Vassé, and Claude Tarlé
- Building: Palace of Versailles
- Country: France
- Coordinates: 48.80497°N 2.12172°E
- Named for: Hercules

The Salon d'Hercule (French pronunciation: [salɔ̃ dɛʁkyl]; also known as the Hercules Salon or the Hercules Drawing Room) is on the first floor of the Château de Versailles and connects the Royal Chapel in the North Wing of the château with the grand appartement du roi.

== Description ==
Originally, the fourth and penultimate chapel, the salon d’Hercule occupies the tribune level of this chapel. Initially called the nouveau salon près de la chapelle (new salon near the chapel) when the room was started in 1710 by Robert de Cotte for Louis XIV. However, with the death of Louis XIV in 1715 the project was postponed (Verlet, 321).

Beginning in 1724, work on the salon d’Hercule recommenced. Louis XV commissioned architect Ange-Jacques Gabriel, marbrier Claude-Félix Tarlé, and sculptors Jacques Verberckt and François-Antoine Vassé to complete the room (Verlet, 321).

The room was completed in 1736 with the ceiling painting Apothéose d’Hercule (Apotheosis of Hercules) by François Lemoyne, which gave the room its present name (Verlet, 322).

There are only two other paintings decorating this room, both of which are by Veronese. Above the fireplace is the artist’s Rebecca at the Well; on the opposite wall forming a pendant is the famed Feast in the House of Simon (Verlet, 322). Louis XIV received the latter painting as a diplomatic gift from the Republic of Venice in 1664. Owing to the size of the work – 4.5 meters high by 9.7 meters long – the painting was displayed in the galerie d’Apollon of the Louvre Palace. It was installed in salon d’Hercule in 1730 where it remained until 1832 at which time it was transferred to the Louvre. In 1961 the Feast in the House of Simon was returned to the salon d’Hercule. In 1994, under the aegis of the Société des amis de Versailles and BNP the painting was restored.

During the reign of Louis XV the room served as a ball room as the King felt the salon de Mars was too small and the Hall of Mirrors was too large. The inaugural ball held in the salon d’Hercule was on 26 January 1739 to celebrate the marriage of Louis XV’s eldest daughter Marie Louise-Élisabeth with Infante Philip of Spain; and the wedding dinner au grand courvert of the Duke of Chartres on 5 January 1769 (Verlet, 323). After the destruction of the escalier des ambassadeurs in 1752, Louis XV planned for the salon d’Hercule to be the landing for a new staircase for the château.

During the reign of Louis XVI the salon d’Hercule served for diplomatic functions such as the embassy sent by Ali II ibn Hussein of Tunis (January 1777); the receptions of the representatives of the Three Estates of the Estates General (May 1789); and, the reception of the embassy of Sultan Hyder Ali of Mysore (September 1778) (Verlet, 555).

== Gallery of images ==
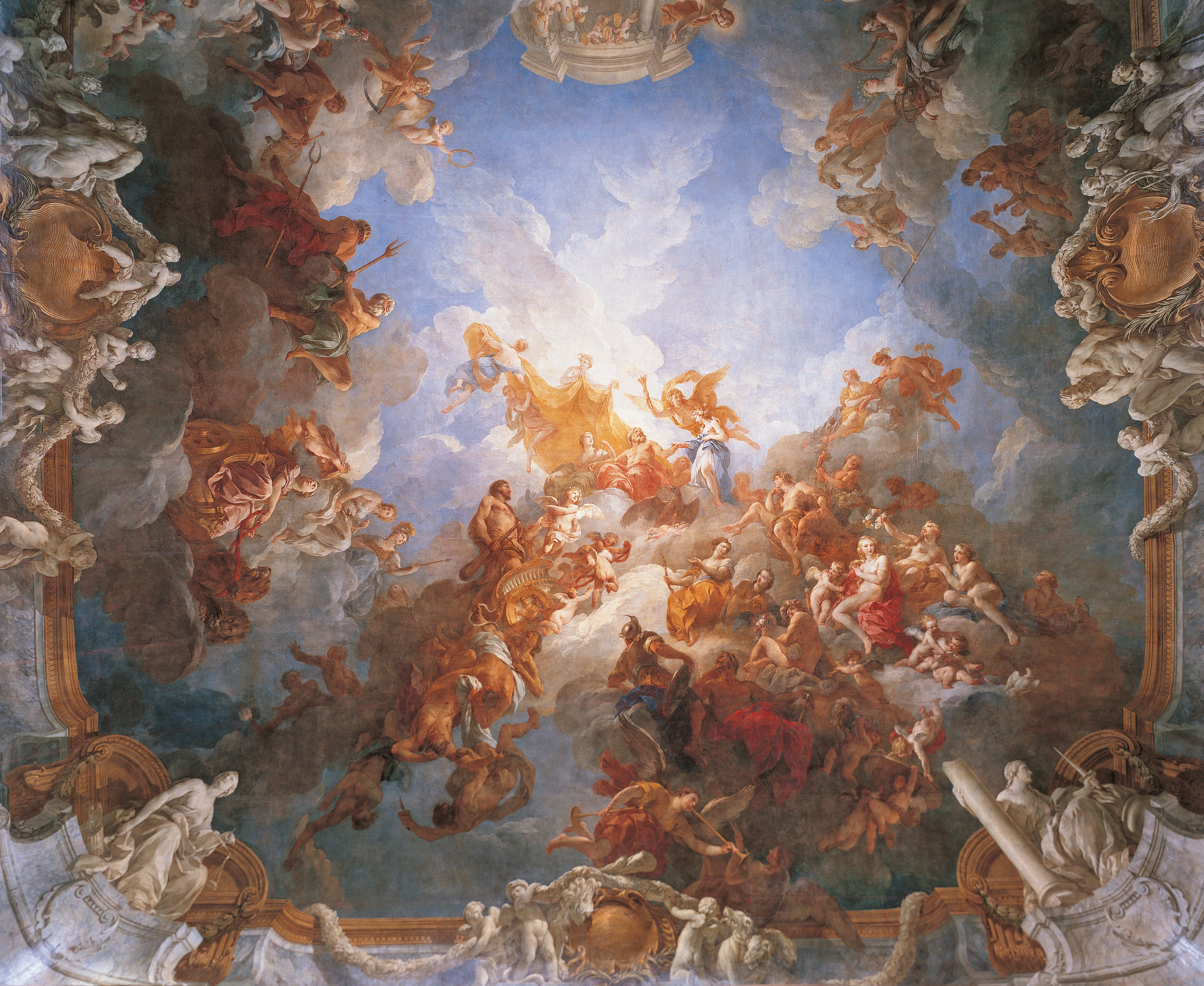
The Apotheosis of Hercules, 1733–1736 (ceiling) by François Lemoyne

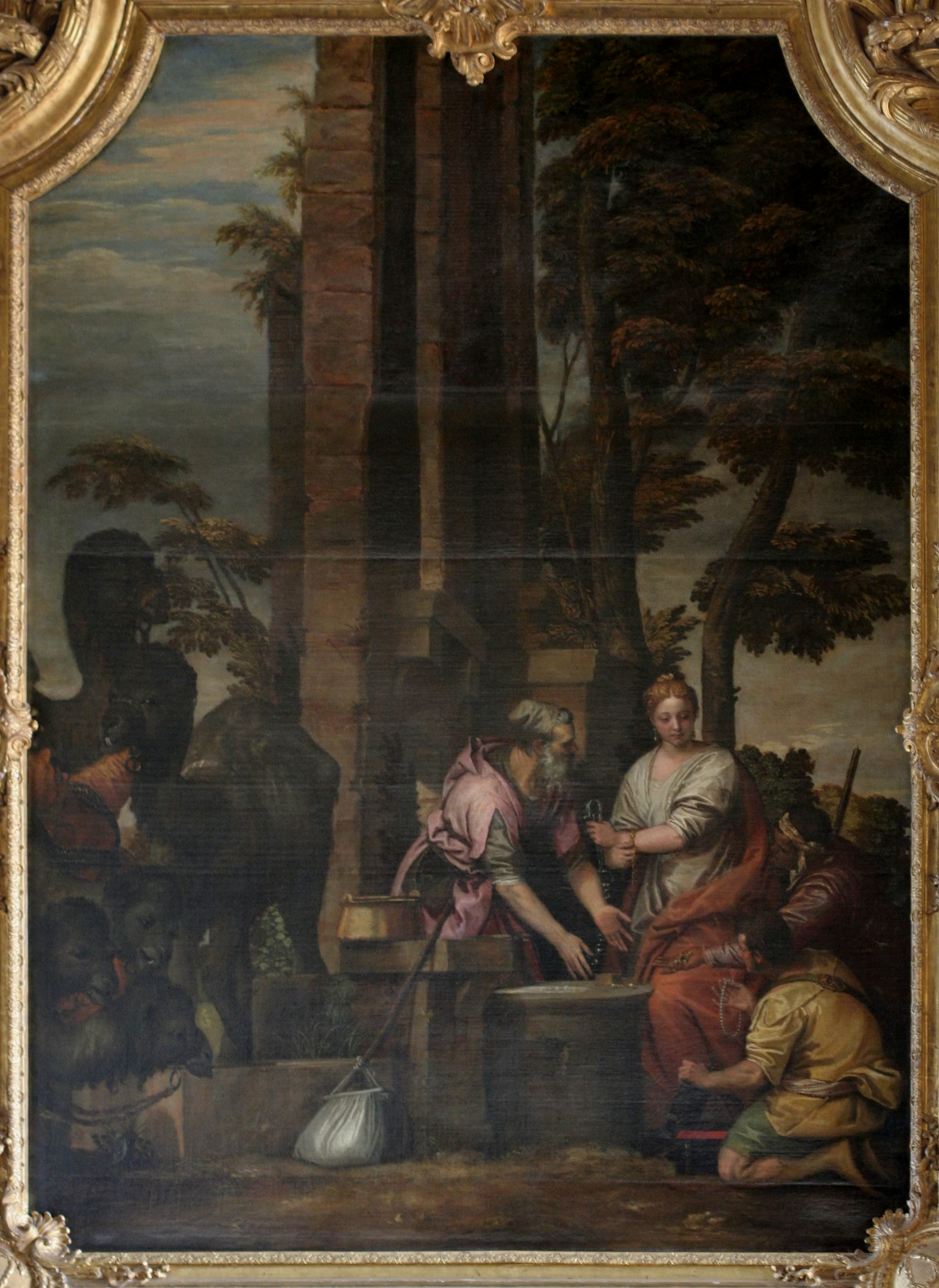
Rebecca at the Well, second half of the 16th century by Veronese

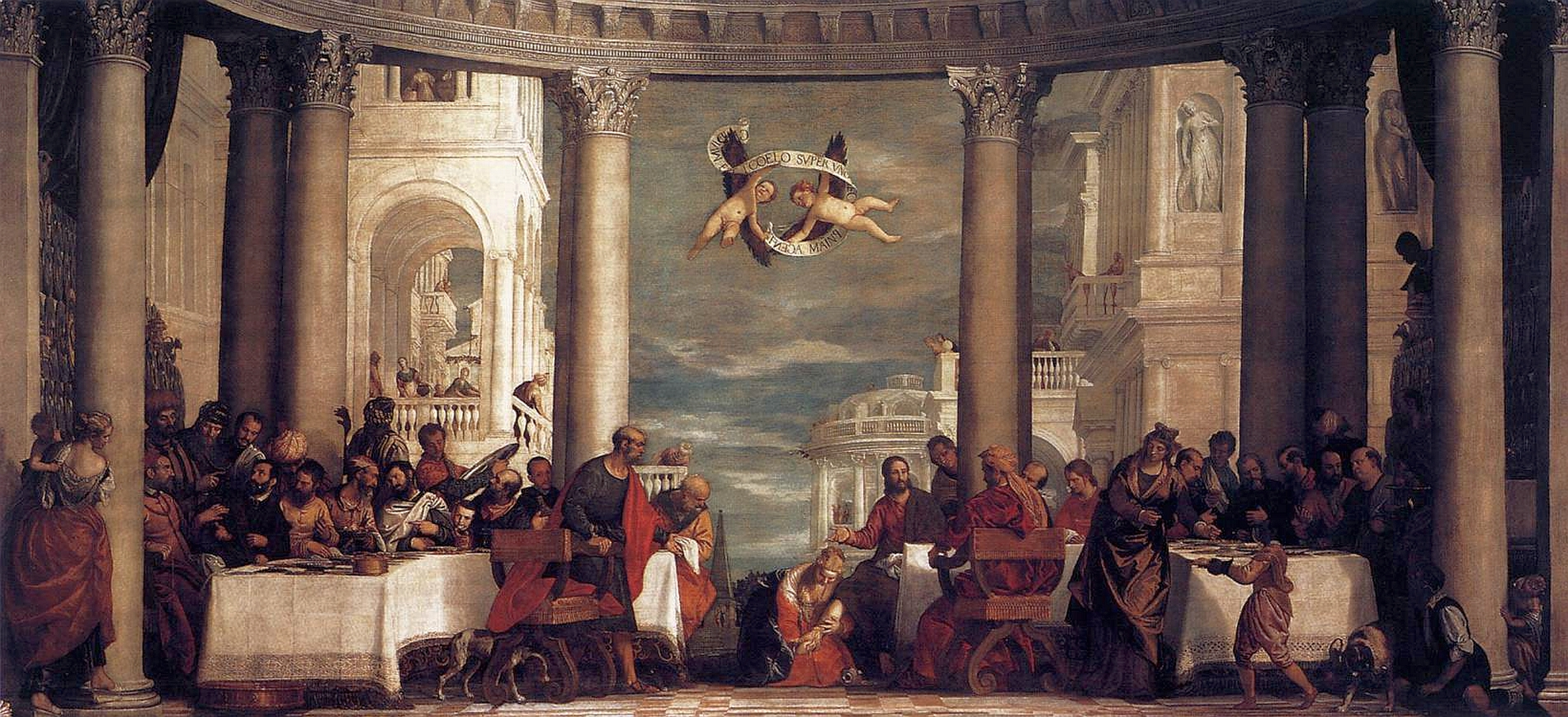
Feast in the House of Simon, 1570 by Veronese

== Sources ==
- Blondel, Jean-François (1752–1756). Architecture françoise, ou Recueil des plans, élévations, coupes et profils des églises, maisons royales, palais, hôtels & édifices les plus considérables de Paris. Vol. 4. Paris: Charles-Antoine Jombert.
- Bluche, François (1986). Louis XIV. Paris: Arthème Fayard.
- Bluche, François (1991). Dictionnaire du Grand Siècle. Paris: Arthème Fayard.
- Bluche, François (2000). Louis XV. Paris: Perrin.
- Croÿ-Solre, Emmanuel de (1906). Journal inédit du duc de Croÿ. Vol. eds. Emmanuel-Henri de Grouchy and Paul Cottin. 4 volumes. Paris : E. Flammarion.
- France d'Hézecques, Félix comte de (1873). Souvenirs d'un page de la cour de Louis XVI. Paris: Didier.
- Lighthart, Edward (1997). Archétype et symbole dans le style Louis XIV versaillais: réflexions sur l'imago rex et l'imago patriae au début de l'époque moderne. Doctoral thesis.
- Luynes, Charles-Philippe d'Albert, duc de (1860–1865). Mémoires sur la cour de Louis XV (1735-1758). Vol. 2. Paris : Firmin-Didot frères.
- Marie, Alfred and Jeanne (1972). Mansart à Versailles. Paris: Editions Jacques Freal.
- Marie, Alfred and Jeanne (1984). Versailles au temps de Louis XV. Paris: Imprimerie Nationale.
- Nolhac, Pierre de (1926). Versailles au XVIIIe siècle. Paris: Louis Conard.
- Nolhac, Pierre de (1929). Versailles. Paris: A. Morancé.
- Nolhac, Pierre de (1930). Versailles et la cour de France: L'Art à Versailles. Paris: Louis Conard.
- Nolhac, Pierre de (1937). La Résurrection de Versailles, souvenirs d'un conservateur, 1887-1920. Paris: Plon.
- Petitfils, Jean-Christian (2005). Louis XVI. Paris: Perrin.
- Verlet, Pierre (1985). Le château de Versailles. Paris: Librairie Arthème Fayard.
