= Narcis =

Narcis may refer to:

- Narcís, or Narcis, a given name, including a list of people with the name
- Belgian minehunter Narcis, a Tripartite-class minehunter
- NARCIS, National Academic Research and Collaboration Information System of the Netherlands
