= Louis Galloche =

French painter (1670–1761)

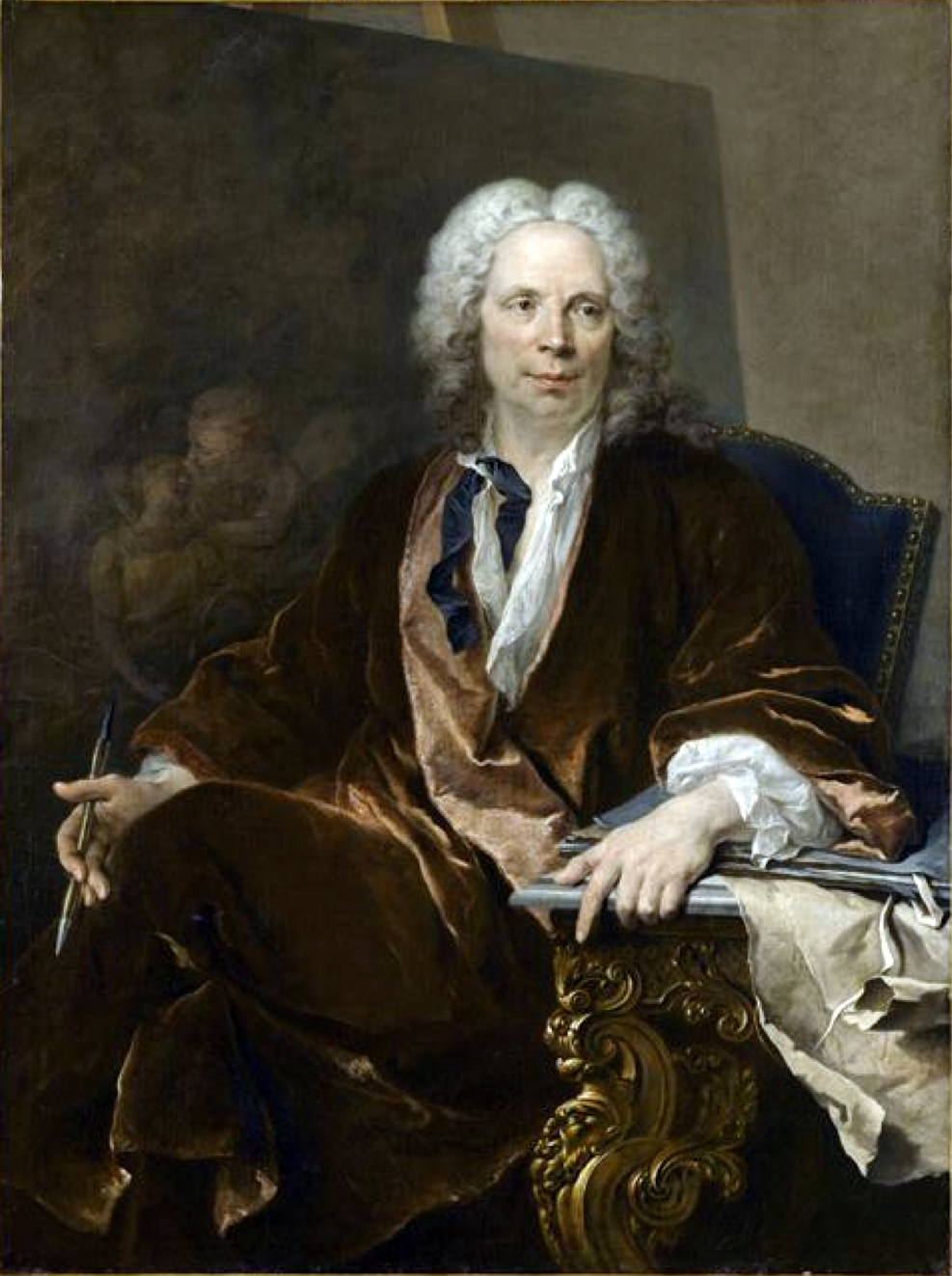
Louis Tocqué, Portrait of Louis Galloche, oil on canvas, 130 x 98 cm, Louvre Museum

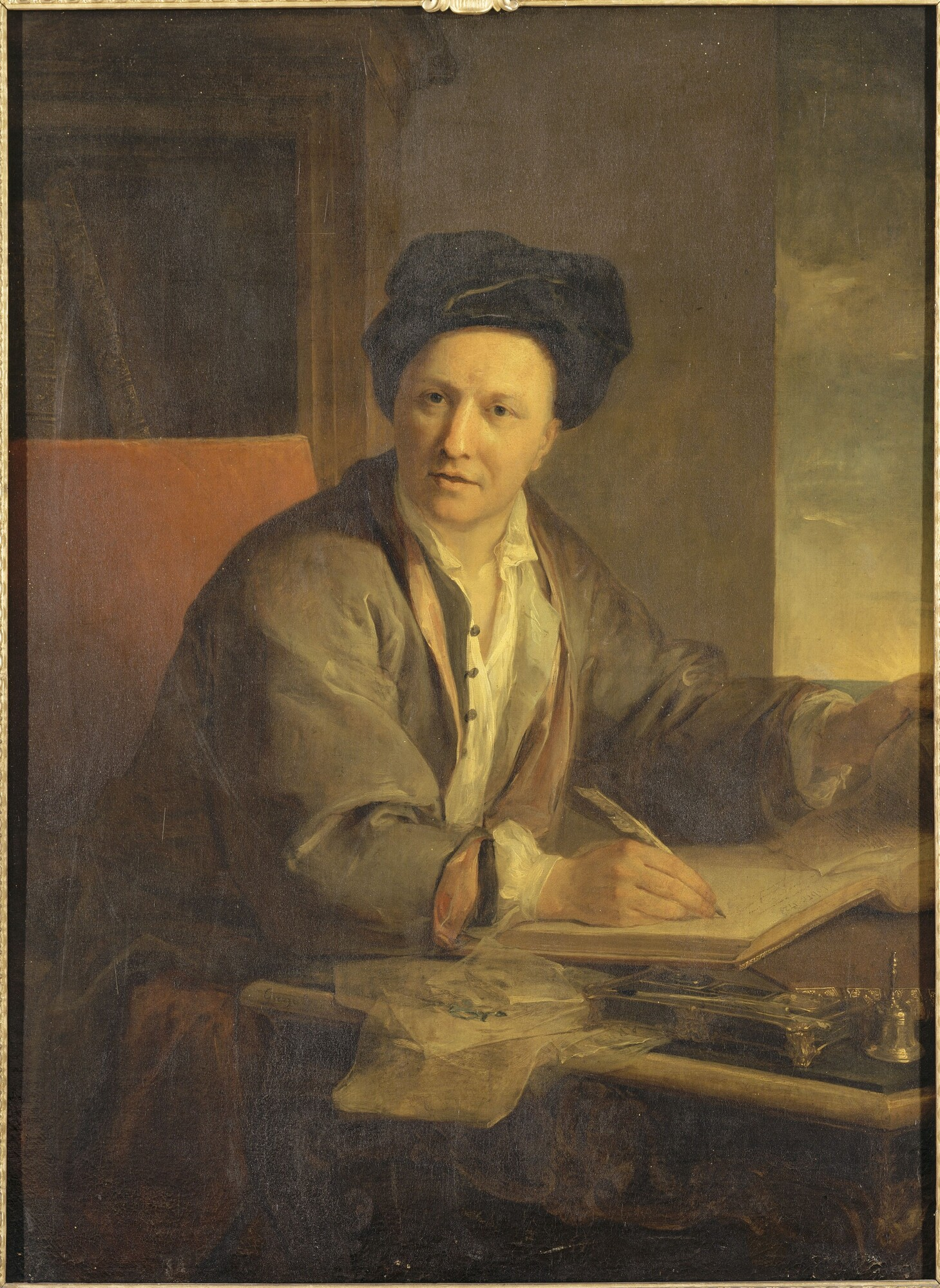
Portrait of Fontenelle by Galloche. Musée national du Château de Versailles.

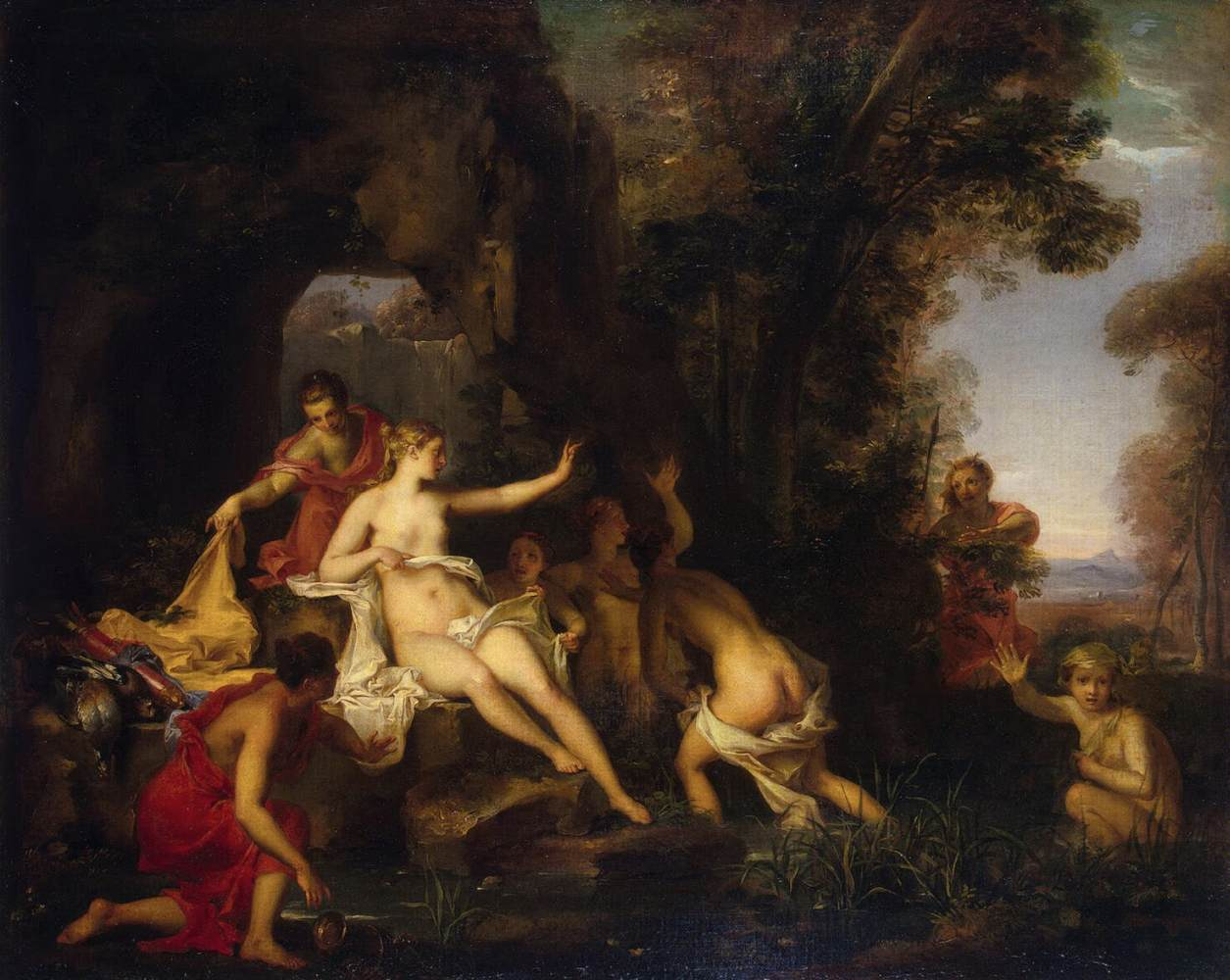
Diana and Actaeon by Galloche.

Louis Galloche (24 August 1670 – 21 July 1761) was a French painter. A student of Louis de Boullogne, his own students included François Lemoyne, Charles-Joseph Natoire and François Boucher.

== Life ==
He was born in Paris, the son of Charles Galloche and Jeanne Martinet. He studied at the Lycée Louis-le-Grand. Originally destined for the church, he soon found he had no vocation and began to study for the civil service. He joined a notary's office, in accordance with his father's wishes, but he didn't stay long. His father finally recognized his taste for painting and offered him a drawing master, who turned out to be a drinker: Galloche left him after six months.

Galloche entered the studio of Louis de Boullogne, first painter to the King, as an apprentice. At the age of 20, the young man set about making up for lost time, so that in just four years, study and diligence enabled him to acquire the skills needed to win first prize in painting in 1695 for a large composition. The required theme was "Jacob, the patriarch"; his painting, The brothers of Joseph bringing their father Jacob his son's robe.

A member of the lower middle class, Galloche came up against the harsh laws of privilege: while his prize gave him the right to spend several years in Rome, he could not claim a sufficient pension from the king, and was reduced to advancing the costs of his journey and part of his stay, which was reduced to two years. After a stopover in Venice, where he immersed himself in all the currents and practiced drawing intensively, he was forced to return to his aging father.

Back in Paris, he opened a studio. One of his first pupils was François Lemoine, whom he kept as an assistant for 12 years.

It was during this period that he composed two large paintings that were long placed above the doors of the refectory at Saint-Martin des Champs. One depicts St. Benedict miraculously bringing back an axe from the water; the other St. Scholastica obtaining rain and thunder from heaven to prevent St. Benedict from leaving. (1703, Musée Carnavalet)

He painted a few secular subjects and landscapes, few portraits and many church pictures. Among the latter is his famous painting of the Translation of the relics of Saint Augustine to Pavia. This piece was considered his masterpiece and one of the best works of the French School. Executed for the refectory of the Petits-Pères, Discalced Augustinians near Place des Victoires, Pigalle realized that this painting, which had been paid to Galloche for only fifty écus, was beginning to spoil in the refectory from the smoke of the food, and he urged the monks to remove it and place it in their sacristy.

Galloche asked, in the flower of his age, for the post of director of the French Academy in Rome in order, he said, to return to the country best suited to the study of the arts in order to help students appreciate art. It was explained to him that the post was intended for a single person and he was married. Galloche had married Louise Catherine Maillard, daughter of a fur merchant who brought a dowry of 40,000 livres.

Church paintings, which were the main occupation of Galloche, these kinds of works were always paid for at a low price, in comparison with paintings of profane subjects, although painters made all the more efforts to bring them to their perfection, as they were destined to remain constantly under the eyes of the public, they provided them with the surest means of establishing or consolidating their reputation and of passing their names to posterity.

M. Galloche, being in his strength, would have liked to be employed on great works, such as the paintings for the tapestries of the Gobelins, but he had no such satisfaction. Despite his usefulness to the Academy, Galloche received few awards, and even then they were only granted to him at very distant times from each other. Under the Regency of Philippe II, Duke of Orléans, he obtained a pension of 500 pounds, which was increased by 100 pounds under the administration of Philibert Orry; it was increased to a hundred pistoles by Tournehem, on the recommendation of Coypel, in whom he had given his confidence.

The Marquis de Marigny also granted accommodation in the galleries of the Louvre to Galloche, who had always wanted to live in a place from which he could discover a vast expanse of sky to contemplate at his ease the varied effects of nature and compare them in large spaces. His wish having been fulfilled, he was so enthusiastic about it that he forgot his old age and formed various plans for work.

Galloche was then 80 years old. But his trembling hand refused to carry out his plans. From that moment, he turned his views towards the advancement of youth, and composed for the students of the Academy five lectures which were read at the Academy and in which he developed the whole theory of his art.

The Abel-François Poisson, Marquis de Marigny, also granted accommodation in the galleries of the Louvre to Galloche, who had always wanted to live in a place from which he could discover a vast expanse of sky to contemplate at his ease the varied effects of nature and compare them in large spaces. His wish having been fulfilled, he was so enthusiastic about it that he forgot his old age and formed various plans for work.

Galloche was then 80 years old. His trembling hand refused to carry out his plans. From that moment, he turned his views towards the advancement of youth, and composed for the students of the Academy five lectures which were read at the Academy and in which he developed the whole theory of his art.

The first deals with drawing and insisted on the importance of the study of the antique as "without doubt one of the most solid bases of our knowledge". He then recommended the study of anatomy, not only dead, but living. The second revolved around color, with the knowledge of chiaroscuro and the copying of paintings by the best masters. His last three lectures contained remarks on the paintings of the great masters and end with the tracing for the use of pupils, who go to Italy, of the route of their picturesque journey. He advises them, after having studied Raphael in Rome; and the Carracci, either at Rome or at Bologna; to go and draw the principles of Titian in Venice, and when they would have acquired wings strong enough to fly on their own without risking getting lost, to end up studying Correggio in Parma.

Louis Galloche died, aged ninety years and eleven months, in his accommodation in the Louvre galleries, and was buried in the church of Saint-Germain-l'Auxerrois.

== Bibliography ==
- François Marandet, "Louis Galloche et Fançois Lemoyne: caractères distinctifs et œuvres inédites", La Revue des Musée de France. Revue du Louvre, 2-2007, p. 29-36.

== Sources ==
- Louis Gougenot, Mémoires inédits sur les membres de l'Académie royale de peinture et de sculpture, Paris, J.-B. Dumoulin, 1854, p. 289-302.
