= Nargis Khanum =

Pakistani journalist (1943–2017)

- Born: Nargis Khanum; 1943; Pune, Maharashtra, British India
- Died: 12 December 2017 (aged 74); Karachi, Sindh, Pakistan
- Resting place: Karachi
- Other name: Nargis Begum
- Education: University of Karachi
- Occupations: News reporter; Novelist; Journalist; Writer
- Years active: 1966–2017

Nargis Khanum (1943 – December 12, 2017) was a Pakistani journalist and writer. She was one of the first female English-language reporters in the country. She was known for her decades-long career writing for major Pakistani publications like Dawn and The Star.

== Early life and education ==
Khanum was born in 1943 in Pune, Maharashtra, in pre-partition British India. Following the partition of India, she moved with her family to Pakistan, where she later earned a master's degree in English Literature from the University of Karachi.

== Career ==
In 1966, Khanum began her career in journalism, joining the Dawn newspaper as one of its first female reporters. During her time there, she covered arts and culture. Khanum went on to serve as news editor for the evening paper, The Star, where she also contributed a column called "Megacity Madness". Later in her career, she wrote a column for the Business Recorder.

== Personal life ==
Khanum was a chess player and frequently played chess with fellow journalist Ghazi Salahuddin at the Karachi Press Club.

== Death ==
Khanum died of a heart attack at the age of 74 on December 12, 2017, while on her way to the Karachi Press Club. Her funeral prayers were held at the Sultan Masjid, and she was laid to rest in the DHA Phase I graveyard. In 2017, the Karachi Press Club added her portrait to its murals of influential women on its boundary wall. These murals honor distinguished women who have significantly contributed to society.
