= Narcissus (2012 film) =

- Film poster
- Lithuanian: Narcizas
- Directed by: Dovilė Gasiūnaitė
- Screenplay by: Dovilė Gasiūnaitė
- Produced by: Teresa Zibolienė
- Starring: Amvrosios Vlachopoulos; Asmik Grigorian; Susanna Perry Gilmore; Sigitas Šidlauskas; Urtė Perminaitė
- Cinematography: Audrius Kemežys
- Edited by: Martina Jablonskytė; Gintas Smilga
- Music by: Giedrius Puskunigis
- Release date: 10 May 2012
- Running time: 95 minutes
- Country: Lithuania
- Languages: Lithuanian; English

Narcissus (Lithuanian: Narcizas) is a 2012 film written and directed by Dovilė Gasiūnaitė. In Greek mythology, Narcissus was a handsome young man, so vain that the gods condemned him to fall in love with his own reflection. Nowadays, Narcissistic personality disorder (NPD) is a pathological preoccupation with issues of self-importance, closely connected to ego-centrism.

In the original screenplay by Dovilė Gasiūnaitė, Teodore is a handsome and gifted string quartet cello player, who becomes increasingly obsessed with himself. His looks, sensitivity, and talent initially draw people in, but his lack of empathy and self-obsession hurt everyone around him. Teodore abandons his family, career, and friends in his quest for an unattainable challenge. His devastating battle takes place in the dark place of his own psyche.

== Music ==
The film's music score was written by Giedrius Puskunigis, and performed by actors who are also professional musicians. Amvrosios Vlachopoulos, the leading actor, is a professional cello player. Susanna Perry Gilmore is currently a first violin and concertmaster at Omaha Symphony.

== Awards and nominations ==
- Best Feature Film, Nominated, Silver Crane Awards (Lithuanian Film Academy)
- Best Music, Nominated, Silver Crane Awards (Lithuanian Film Academy)
- Best Supporting Actress, Nominated, Silver Crane Awards (Lithuanian Film Academy)
- Audience Choice Award, Kaunas International Film Festival, 2012
