= Narciso =

Narciso may refer to:

== Given name ==
- Narciso Clavería y de Palacios, Spanish architect
- Narciso Clavería y Zaldúa, Governor General of the Philippines
- Narciso dos Santos, Brazilian former footballer
- Narciso Durán, Franciscan friar and missionary
- Narciso López, Venezuelan adventurer
- Narciso Mina, Ecuadorian footballer
- Narciso Rodriguez, American fashion designer
- Narciso Ramos, Filipino journalist
- Narciso Vernizzi, Brazilian sports journalist
- Narciso Yepes, Spanish classical guitarist

== Surname ==
- Antonio Narciso, Italian footballer
- Frederick Narciso, American poker player

== Other ==
- Narciso (opera), an opera by Domenico Scarlatti
- Narciso (drag queen), Italian drag queen

== See also ==
- Chicho, Spanish nickname sometimes used for people called Narciso
