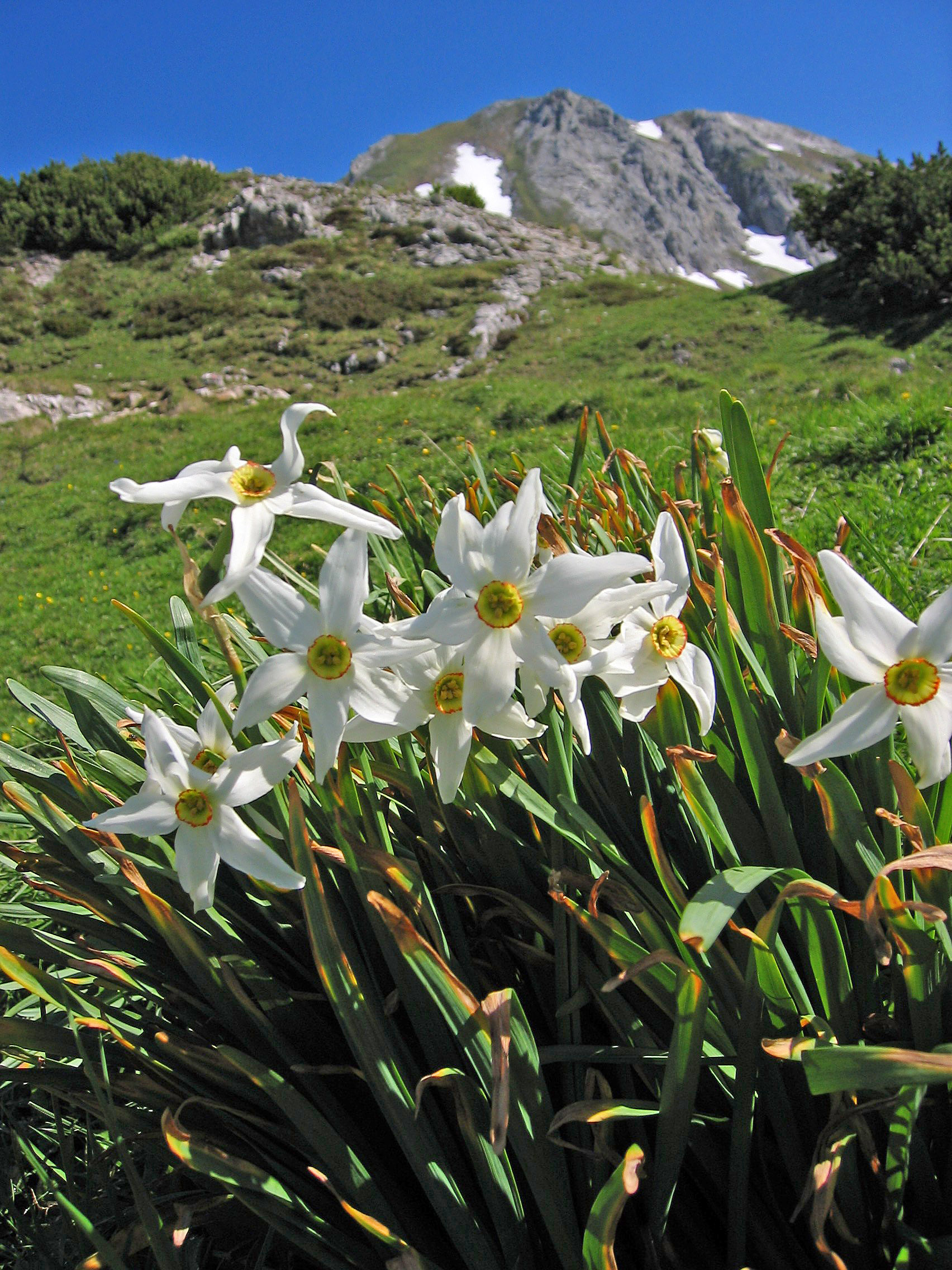
- Narcissus poeticus

Scientific classification
- Kingdom: Plantae
- Clade: Embryophytes
- Clade: Tracheophytes
- Clade: Angiosperms
- Clade: Monocots
- Order: Asparagales
- Family: Amaryllidaceae
- Subfamily: Amaryllidoideae
- Tribe: Narcisseae
- Genus: Narcissus; L.

Type species
- Narcissus poeticus L.

Subgenera
- Hermione; Narcissus

= List of Narcissus species =

Narcissus (Daffodil) Temporal range: 24–0 Ma Late Oligocene - Recent

This list of Narcissus species shows the accepted species names within the genus Narcissus (/nɑːrˈsɪsəs/), which are predominantly spring perennial plants in the amaryllis family Amaryllidaceae. Various common names including daffodil, narcissus, and jonquil are used to describe all or some members of the genus. The list of species is arranged by subgenus and section. Originally in 1753, Carl Linnaeus included only six species, while modern estimates of the number of species in the genus Narcissus have varied widely, from anywhere between 16 to nearly 160 species. As of May 2025, Plants of the World Online accepts 76 species, along with 93 hybrids.

Much of the variation lies in the definition of species, and whether closely related taxa are considered separate species or subspecies. Thus, a very wide view of each species, such as Webb's results in few species, while a very narrow view such as that of Fernandes results in a larger number. Another factor is the status of hybrids, given natural hybridisation. There is a distinction between what are referred to as 'ancient hybrids' which are found occurring over a relatively large area, and 'recent hybrids' with a more restricted range and found growing as solitary plants amongst their parents. The former are more often considered as separate species.

Fernandes (1951) accepted 22 species, on which were based the 27 species listed by Webb in the 1980 Flora Europaea. By 1968, Fernandes had accepted 63 species, and by 1990 Blanchard listed 65 species, and Erhardt 66 in 1993. In 2006 the International Daffodil Register listed 87 species. In contrast, the genetic study by Zonneveld (2008) resulted in only 36 species (for list and comparison with Webb, see Zonneveld Table 4).

Cultivars and species common names can be found in the Royal Horticultural Society's Botanical Classification and list of botanical names which is the basis of their International Daffodil Register. This is a searchable list and had 83 accepted species names in its December 2017 release.

== Table of Narcissus species ==
Over 300 synonymous species names are listed, reflecting wide variations in how the genus is divided into species. These have been arranged into Sections. These should not be confused with the horticultural classification of cultivars into divisions by the Royal Horticultural Society

Sections (with type species) shown are according to Zonneveld (2008). In addition Mathew (2002) further divides the sections into subsections.

- Apodanthi (N. calcicola)
- Bulbocodium (N. bulbocodium)
- Ganymedes (N. triandrus)
- Jonquillae (N. jonquilla)
- Juncifolii (N. assoanus)
- Narcissus (N. poeticus)
- Nevadensis (N. nevadensis)
- Pseudonarcissus (N. pseudonarcissus)
- Tapeinanthus (N. cavanillesii)
- Serotini (N. serotinus)
- Tazettae (N. tazetta)

For a list of species by Section according to the Royal Horticultural Society, see the RHS Botanical Classification (last updated December 2017), which is the basis of their International Daffodil Register.

For the most recent classification, see the list of species from Plants of the World Online placed below the table.

Name	Authority	Common name	Image	Distribution
Subgenus Hermione (Haw.) Spach. Type species: N. tazetta
Section Aurelia (Gay) Baker; Narcissus broussonetii (incorporated into Tazettae, 2008)
Section Serotini Parlatore
Narcissus obsoletus syn. N. miniatus	(Haw.) Spach; Donnison-Morgan, Koopowitz & Zonneveld		Flowers of Narcissus obsoletus	West, north and east Mediterranean basin Map
Narcissus serotinus Type species	L.		Flower of Narcissus serotinus	Spain, NW Africa Additional map
Section Tazettae de Candolle
Narcissus broussonetii (Note: Moved from Aurelia)	Lag. y Seg.		Flowers of Narcissus broussonetii	North Africa; Map
Narcissus dubius	Gouan		Flowers of Narcissus dubius	NW Spain, S France Additional map
Narcissus elegans	(Haw.) Spach		Image	West Mediterranean; Map
Narcissus papyraceus syn. N. barlae	Ker Gawl. Parlatore	Paperwhite	Flowers of Narcissus papyraceus	NW Africa, west and north Mediterranean Additional map
Narcissus tazetta Type species	L.		Flowers of Narcissus tazetta	Mediterranean basin, Middle East; Map
Subgenus Narcissus L. Type species: N. poeticus
Section Apodanthi A.Fernandes
Narcissus albimarginatus	D.Müll.-Doblies & U.Müll.-Doblies		Image	Morocco; Map
Narcissus calcicola Type species	Mendonça		Flower of Narcissus calcicola	Distribution map of Narcissus calcicola
Narcissus rupicola syn. N. atlanticus	Dufour ex Schult.f. Stern		Flowers of Narcissus rupicola	Portugal, Spain, Morocco Additional map
Narcissus scaberulus	Henriq.		Image	Distribution map of Narcissus scaberulus
Previously N. cuatrecasasii Fern.Casas (moved to Jonquillae)
Section Bulbocodium de Candolle
Narcissus bulbocodium Type species	L.	Hoop-petticoat daffodil	Flowers of Narcissus bulbocodium	France, Spain; Map
Narcissus cantabricus	DC.	White Hoop-petticoat Daffodil	Flowers of Narcissus cantabricus	Spain, NW Africa Additional map
Narcissus foliosus	(Maire) Fern.Casas		Image	Morocco; Map
Narcissus hedraeanthus	(Webb & Heldr.) Colmeiro		Flower of Narcissus hedraeanthus	Distribution map of Narcissus hedraeanthus
Narcissus nivalis	Graells		Image	Spain, Portugal; Map
Narcissus obesus	Salisb.		Flower of Narcissus obesus	Distribution map of Narcissus obesus
Narcissus romieuxii	Braun-Blanq. & Maire		Flowers of Narcissus romieuxii	Morocco; Map
Doubtful: Narcissus hesperidis Fern.Casas; Narcissus jeanmonodii Fern.Casas; Narcissus tingitanus Fern.Casas
Section Ganymedes (Haworth) Schultes f.
Narcissus lusitanicus	Dorda & Fern. Casas		Flower of Narcissus lusitanicus	Portugal; Map
Narcissus pallidulus syn. N. cernuus (Note: Not currently accepted by The Plant List, which lists it as a synonym of N. cernuus Salisb., which is listed by Mathews as a variety of N. triandrus.)	Graells; Salisb.		Image	Spain, Portugal; Map
Narcissus triandrus (Note: N. lusitanicus and N. pallidulus originally considered subspecies or varieties of N. triandrus. However both Zonnefeld (2008), together with Dorda and Fernandez Casas (1989) and Perez-Barrales et al. (2006) find sufficient evidence to consider these to be separate species); Type species	L.	Angel's-tears	Flowers of Narcissus triandrus	France, Spain, Portugal; Map
Section Jonquilla de Candolle (Note: N. assoanus Dufour ex Schult. & Schult.f. and N. gaditanus Boiss. & Reut. were previously included in Jonquilla but were moved to Juncifolii in 2008 when this was split off (Zonneveld 2008))
Narcissus blanchardii syn. N. flavus (Note: N. flavus is the accepted name according to The Plant List, but Zonneveld, who described the taxon, disputes this. (Akers 2011))	Zonn. stat. nov. Lag.		Image	Portugal, Spain; Map
Narcissus cuatrecasasii (Note: Moved from Apodanthi (Zonneveld 2008))	Fern.Casas, Lainz & Ruiz Rejon		Flower of Narcissus cuatrecasasii	Spain, Morocco Additional map
Narcissus jonquilla Type species	L.	Jonquil; Rush daffodil	Flowers of Narcissus jonquilla	Distribution map of Narcissus jonquilla
Narcissus viridiflorus	Schousb.		Flowers of Narcissus viridiflorus	Gibraltar, Morocco; Map
Section Juncifolii (A. Fern.) Zonn. sect nov. (Note: Fernandes considered this a subsection of Jonquilla)
Narcissus assoanus Type species	Dufour	Rush-leaf jonquil	|	E Spain, S France Additional map
Narcissus gaditanus	Boiss. & Reuter		Flower of Narcissus gaditanus	Distribution map of Narcissus gaditanus
Section Narcissus L.
Narcissus poeticus Type species	L.	Poet's Narcissus	Flower of Narcissus poeticus	Central Europe; Map
Section Nevadensis Zonn. sect. nov (Note: Although Aedo in the Flora Iberica considered these to all be Narcissus pseudonarcissus L. subsp. nevadensis (Pugsley) A. Fern., (Aedo 2014) Medrano et al. criticised this approach for ignoring phylogenetic evidence to the contrary, and their data support the differentiation into these three species. (Medrano 2014))
Narcissus bujei (Note: While the World Checklist considers this to be a synonym of N. longispathus, Zonneveld treated it as a separate species on the basis of DNA content)	Fern. Casas		Image	S Spain
Narcissus longispathus (Note: Moved from Pseudonarcissus (Zonneveld 2008))	Pugsley			S Spain; Map
Narcissus nevadensis Type species	Pugsley			
Section Pseudonarcissus de Candolle (Note: The taxonomy and speciation of Section Pseudonarcissus, the largest section, has proved particularly problematic, even after splitting it into two. Zonneveld subdivided the section into two sections Pseudonarcissus (France, northern Spain and Portugal) and Nevadensis (southern Spain). Opinions as to the number of species varies considerably, from considering the section as a single variable species to a section with a very large number of species. Zonneveld accepted eight, with those taxa having similar amounts of DNA considered as either synonyms or subspecies. He accepted eight subspecies.(Zonneveld 2008) Mathew considered there to be two groups, which he labelled A (small flowers up to 3.5 cm in diameter) and B (large flowers, 5–12 cm in diameter).(Mathew 2002)); Trumpet daffodils
Narcissus abscissus	(Haw.) Roem. & Schult.f.		Image	Spain, S France Additional map
Narcissus asturiensis	(Jord.) Pugsley			N Spain, Portugal; Map
Narcissus cyclamineus	DC.	Cyclamen-flowered Daffodil		Portugal, NW Spain; Map
Narcissus jacetanus	Fern.Casas			NE Spain; Map
Narcissus moleroi	Fern.Casas		Image	
Narcissus primigenius	(Fern.Suárez ex M.Laínz) Fern.Casas & Laínz		Image	
Narcissus pseudonarcissus Type species	L.	Wild Daffodil		W. Europe; Map
Previously: N. alcaracensis syn. N. longispathus; N. confusus Pugsley syn. N. pseudonarcissus; N. hispanicus Gouan syn. N. pseudonarcissus (Spanish Daffodil); N. longispathus (moved to Nevadensis); N. minor syn. N. pseudonarcissus (Lesser Wild Daffodil); N. moschatus syn. N. pseudonarcissus (White Daffodil); N. nevadensis Pugsley (moved to Nevadensis); N. obvallaris syn. N. pseudonarcissus (Tenby Daffodil); N. radinganorum Fern. Casas syn. N. pseudonarcissus
Section Tapeinanthus (Herbert) Traub
Narcissus cavanillesii	Barra & G.López			Portugal, Spain, NW Africa Additional map

== List of species (2025) ==
The following species and nothospecies are currently accepted in the genus Narcissus:

- Narcissus × abilioi Fern.Casas
- Narcissus abscissus (Haw.) Schult. & Schult.f.
- Narcissus × aedoi Fern.Casas
- Narcissus × aguiarii Fern.Casas
- Narcissus albicans (Haw.) Spreng.
- Narcissus albimarginatus D.Müll.-Doblies & U.Müll.-Doblies
- Narcissus alcaracensis S.Ríos, D.Rivera, Alcaraz & Obón
- Narcissus alcobacensis A.Fern. ex Fern.Casas
- Narcissus × alejandrei Fern.Casas
- Narcissus × alentejanus Fern.Casas
- Narcissus × alleniae Donn.-Morg.
- Narcissus × aloysii-villarii Fern.Casas
- Narcissus × andorranus Fern.Casas
- Narcissus × andujarensis Hervás, Patino, Solís & Urrutia
- Narcissus × aranensis Fern.Casas
- Narcissus assoanus Dufour ex Schult. & Schult.f.
- Narcissus atlanticus Stern
- Narcissus × backhousei Baker
- Narcissus × bakeri K.Richt.
- Narcissus bellirius Fridl.
- Narcissus × bernardi DC. ex Hénon
- Narcissus bertolonii Parl.
- Narcissus bicolor L.
- Narcissus × boutignyanus Philippe
- Narcissus × brevitubulosus A.Fern.
- Narcissus × briffae Mifsud
- Narcissus broussonetii Lag.
- Narcissus bujei (Fern.Casas) Fern.Casas
- Narcissus bulbocodium L.
- Narcissus × buxtonii K.Richt.
- Narcissus calcicola Mendonça
- Narcissus cantabricus DC.
- Narcissus × caramulensis P.Ribeiro, Paiva & H.Freitas
- Narcissus × cardonae Lloret & Fern.Casas
- Narcissus × carringtonii Rozeira
- Narcissus cavanillesii Barra & G.López
- Narcissus × cazorlanus Fern.Casas
- Narcissus × chevassutii Fern.Casas
- Narcissus × cofinyalensis Uribe-Ech. & Urrutia
- Narcissus × compressus Haw.
- Narcissus confusus Pugsley
- Narcissus × consolationis Fern.Casas
- Narcissus × corcyrensis (Herb.) Nyman
- Narcissus cordubensis Fern.Casas
- Narcissus cuatrecasasii Fern.Casas, M.Laínz & Ruíz Rejón
- Narcissus cuneiflorus (Salisb. ex Haw.) Link
- Narcissus cyclamineus DC.
- Narcissus deficiens Herb.
- Narcissus × dezanus García Mart. & Silva Pando
- Narcissus dubius Gouan
- Narcissus × egabrensis J.López-Tirado
- Narcissus × esteban-infantesii Díez Domínguez & Hervás
- Narcissus fernandesii Pedro
- Narcissus × fosteri Lynch
- Narcissus gaditanus Boiss. & Reut.
- Narcissus × galaicus González, Patino, Solís & Urrutia
- Narcissus × galdoanus Fern.Casas
- Narcissus gallaecicus Fern.Casas
- Narcissus × gatensis J.F.Álvarez, Castro Prig., P.Gómez-Murillo & Áng.Sánchez
- Narcissus × georgemawii Fern.Casas
- Narcissus gigas (Haw.) Steud.
- Narcissus grandae Áng.Sánchez, J.F.Álvarez, Castro Prig., Crystal, P.Gómez-Mur
- Narcissus × gredensis Fern.Casas
- Narcissus × hannibalis A.Fern.
- Narcissus hedraeanthus (Webb & Heldr.) Colmeiro
- Narcissus × hervasii Barra & Ureña
- Narcissus hesperidis Fern.Casas
- Narcissus × hispalensis J.López-Tirado
- Narcissus hispanicus Gouan
- Narcissus × incomparabilis Mill.
- Narcissus jacetanus Fern.Casas
- Narcissus jacquemoudii Fern.Casas
- Narcissus jeanmonodii Fern.Casas
- Narcissus jonquilla L.
- Narcissus × juanae Fern.Casas
- Narcissus × kirchnerianus P.Escobar
- Narcissus × koshinomurae Fern.Casas
- Narcissus leonensis Pugsley
- Narcissus × libarensis Sánchez García & Mart.Ort.
- Narcissus × litigiosus Amo
- Narcissus macrolobus (Jord.) Pugsley
- Narcissus × madronensis Fern.Casas
- Narcissus × maginae Fern.Casas & Susanna
- Narcissus × magnenii Rouy
- Narcissus magniobesus Fern.Casas
- Narcissus mantisalcus Fern.Casas
- Narcissus × mariae-angelorum Fern.Casas
- Narcissus × maroccanus Fern.Casas
- Narcissus × martinoae Nava & Fern.Casado
- Narcissus marvieri Jahand. & Maire
- Narcissus matiasii Fern.Casas
- Narcissus × medioluteus Mill.
- Narcissus × mikelii-lordae Fern.Casas
- Narcissus minor L.
- Narcissus moleroi Fern.Casas
- Narcissus × monochromus P.D.Sell
- Narcissus moschatus L.
- Narcissus × munozii-alvarezii J.López-Tirado
- Narcissus munozii-garmendiae Fern.Casas
- Narcissus × neocarpetanus Rivas Ponce, C.Soriano & Fern.Casas
- Narcissus nevadensis Pugsley
- Narcissus nobilis (Haw.) Schult. & Schult.f.
- Narcissus × nutans Haw.
- Narcissus obesus Salisb.
- Narcissus obsoletus (Haw.) Spach
- Narcissus × odorus L.
- Narcissus × oiarbidei Fern.Casas & Uribe-Ech.
- Narcissus × olivensis Fern.Casas & Florencio
- Narcissus pachybolbus Durieu
- Narcissus × palentinus Fern.Casas
- Narcissus pallidiflorus Pugsley
- Narcissus papyraceus Ker Gawl.
- Narcissus × parautensis Fern.Casas & P.Gómez-Murillo
- Narcissus × perangustus Fern.Casas
- Narcissus × perezlarae Font Quer
- Narcissus peroccidentalis Fern.Casas
- Narcissus × petri-mariae Fern.Casas
- Narcissus × poculiformis Salisb.
- Narcissus poeticus L.
- Narcissus × ponsii-sorollae Fern.Casas
- Narcissus portensis Pugsley
- Narcissus portomosensis A.Fern. ex Fern.Casas
- Narcissus pseudonarcissus L.
- Narcissus × pugsleyi Fern.Casas
- Narcissus × pujolii Font Quer
- Narcissus × pyrenaicus Dorda, Rivas Ponce & Fern.Casas
- Narcissus × rafaelii Patino & Uribe-Ech.
- Narcissus ramirezii P.Gómez-Murillo, Arellano-Martín & Áng.Sánchez
- Narcissus × repulloi J.López-Tirado
- Narcissus × richardianus P.Escobar
- Narcissus × rogendorfii Batt. & Trab.
- Narcissus romieuxii Braun-Blanq. & Maire
- Narcissus × romoi Fern.Casas
- Narcissus rupicola Dufour
- Narcissus × rupidulus Fern.Casas & Susanna
- Narcissus salmonii Fern.Casas
- Narcissus saltuum Fern.Casas
- Narcissus × sandersii Díez Domínguez & Hervás
- Narcissus scaberulus Henriq.
- Narcissus segoviensis Fern.Casas
- Narcissus segurensis S.Ríos, D.Rivera, Alcaraz & Obón
- Narcissus serotinus L.
- Narcissus × sexitanus Fern.Casas
- Narcissus smythiesii Fern.Casas
- Narcissus × somedanus Fern.Casado, Nava & Suárez Pérez
- Narcissus × splendidus P.Gómez-Murillo & Arellano-Martín
- Narcissus × stenanthus (Lange) Fern.Casas
- Narcissus supramontanus Arrigoni
- Narcissus × taitii Henriq.
- Narcissus tazetta L.
- Narcissus × tenuior Curtis
- Narcissus tortifolius Fern.Casas
- Narcissus × trevejensis Patino, Urrutia & Valencia
- Narcissus triandrus L.
- Narcissus × trianoi J.López-Tirado
- Narcissus × trilobus L.
- Narcissus × tuckeri Barra & G.López
- Narcissus × turrensis Tucker ex De Bellard & Hervás
- Narcissus × urrutiae Fern.Casas & Uribe-Ech.
- Narcissus vilchezii P.Gómez-Murillo & Hervás
- Narcissus × villanovensis J.López-Tirado
- Narcissus viridiflorus Schousb.
- Narcissus watieri Maire
- Narcissus × weickertii Sánchez Gullón & Castro Prig.
- Narcissus willkommii (Samp.) A.Fern.
- Narcissus × xanthochlorus Fern.Casas
- Narcissus × xaverii Nava & Fern.Casado
- Narcissus yepesii S.Ríos, D.Rivera, Alcaraz & Obón
- Narcissus × zorrakinii Fern.Casas, Patino, J.Valencia & Uribe-Ech.

== See also ==
- Taxonomy of Narcissus
- List of Narcissus horticultural divisions
- List of AGM narcissus - species and cultivars which have won the RHS Award of Garden Merit
- List of Narcissus species (Spanish version)

== Works cited ==
=== Books ===
- Aedo, C (2014). "Narcissus L." (PDF). In Talavera, S; Andrés, C; Arista, M; Fernández Piedra, MP; Rico, E; Crespo, MB; Quintanar, A; Herrero, A; Aedo, C (eds.). Flora Iberica. Vol 20 (in Spanish). Madrid: Real Jardín Botánico, Consejo Superior de Investigaciones Científicas.
- Blanchard, J. W. (1990). Narcissus: a guide to wild daffodils. Surrey, UK: Alpine Garden Society. ISBN 978-0-900048-53-1.
- Erhardt, Walter (1993). Narzissen: Osterglocken, Jonquillen, Tazetten (in German). Stuttgart (Hohenheim): E. Ulmer. ISBN 978-3-8001-6489-9.
- Fernandes, A. (1968). "Keys to the identification of native and naturalized taxa of the genus Narcissus L." (PDF). Daffodil and Tulip Year Book. pp. 37–66.
- Hanks, Gordon R (2002). Narcissus and Daffodil: The Genus Narcissus. London: CRC Press. ISBN 978-0-203-21935-5.
- Haworth, A.H. (1831). Narcissinearum Monographia (PDF) (2nd. ed.). London: Ridgway.
- Linnaeus, Carl (1753). Species Plantarum vol. 1. p. 289.
- Mathew, B. (2002). Classification of the genus Narcissus. CRC Press. pp. 30–52. ISBN 9780203219355. In Hanks (2002)
- Tutin, T. G.; Heywood, V H; Burges, N. A.; Moore, D. M.; Valentine, D. H.; Walters, S. M.; Webb, D. A., eds. (1980). Flora Europaea. Volume 5, Alismataceae to Orchidaceae (monocotyledones). Cambridge, England: Cambridge University Press. ISBN 978-0-521-20108-7.
- Webb, D. A. (1980). Narcissus L. Cambridge University Press. pp. 78–84. ISBN 9780521201087., in Tutin et al (1980)

=== Articles ===
- Fernandes, A. (1951). "Sur la phylogenie des especes du genre Narcissus L." Boletim da Sociedade Broteriana II. 25: 113–190. Archived from the original on 6 October 2014.
- Fernández-Casas, Francisco Javier (2011). "Narcissorum Notulae, XXXI" (PDF). Fontqueria (in Spanish). 56 (26): 239–248. Archived from the original (PDF) on 6 October 2014.
- Medrano, Mónica; López-Perea, Esmeralda; Herrera, Carlos M. (2014). "Population Genetics Methods Applied to a Species Delimitation Problem: Endemic Trumpet Daffodils (Narcissus Section Pseudonarcissi) from the Southern Iberian Peninsula" (PDF). International Journal of Plant Sciences. 175 (5, June): 501–517. doi:10.1086/675977. hdl:10261/101673. S2CID 44161272.
- Zonneveld, B. J. M. (2008). "The systematic value of nuclear DNA content for all species of Narcissus L. (Amaryllidaceae)". Plant Systematics and Evolution. 275 (1–2): 109–132. doi:10.1007/s00606-008-0015-1. hdl:1887/13962.

=== Websites ===
- Akers, J. (2011). "Narcissus flavus" (October 10). Daffnet. American Daffodil Society.
