= Narcissus foliosus =

Scientific classification
- Kingdom: Plantae
- Clade: Tracheophytes
- Clade: Angiosperms
- Clade: Monocots
- Order: Asparagales
- Family: Amaryllidaceae
- Subfamily: Amaryllidoideae
- Genus: Narcissus
- Species: N. foliosus

Binomial name
- Narcissus foliosus (Maire) Fern.Casas

Synonyms
- Narcissus monophyllus var. foliosus Maire; Narcissus cantabricus subsp. cantabricus var. foliosus (Maire) A. Fernandes

Species of daffodil

Narcissus foliosus is a species of the genus Narcissus (Daffodils) in the family Amaryllidaceae. It is classified in Section Bulbocodium.

== Description ==
Originally described by Maire as Narcissus monophyllus var. foliosus in 1929:

"A var. typico differt floribus paulo majoribus (3,5-6 cm longis) longiuscule (5-8 mm) pedicellatis (nec subsessilibus; foliis numerosis (3-8) A N. cantabrico DC. differt corona margine vix repanda (nec eroso-fimbriata), foliis erectis. Flores albi."

While similar to N. cantabricus in many ways, there are important differences justifying treating N. foliosus as a separate species as proposed by Fernández-Casas in 2005. The bulbs are generally larger with external tunics that are brown rather than black, with multiple leaves as opposed to only one. The leaves are rigid, erect, and firmer and wider than in N. cantabricus. In longitudinal section the corona appears as an extension of the floral tube, and does not demonstrate the sharp angling seen in N. cantabricus.

== Taxonomy ==
The species name is derived from foliosus, -a, -um (Latin adjective: leafy), probably chosen to indicate a difference from Narcissus cantabricus which has only one leaf per bulb and which was subordinate in origin.

== Distribution ==
Morocco, North Africa. It is not as limited in range as N. cantabricus, and is found further west and south than the latter.
