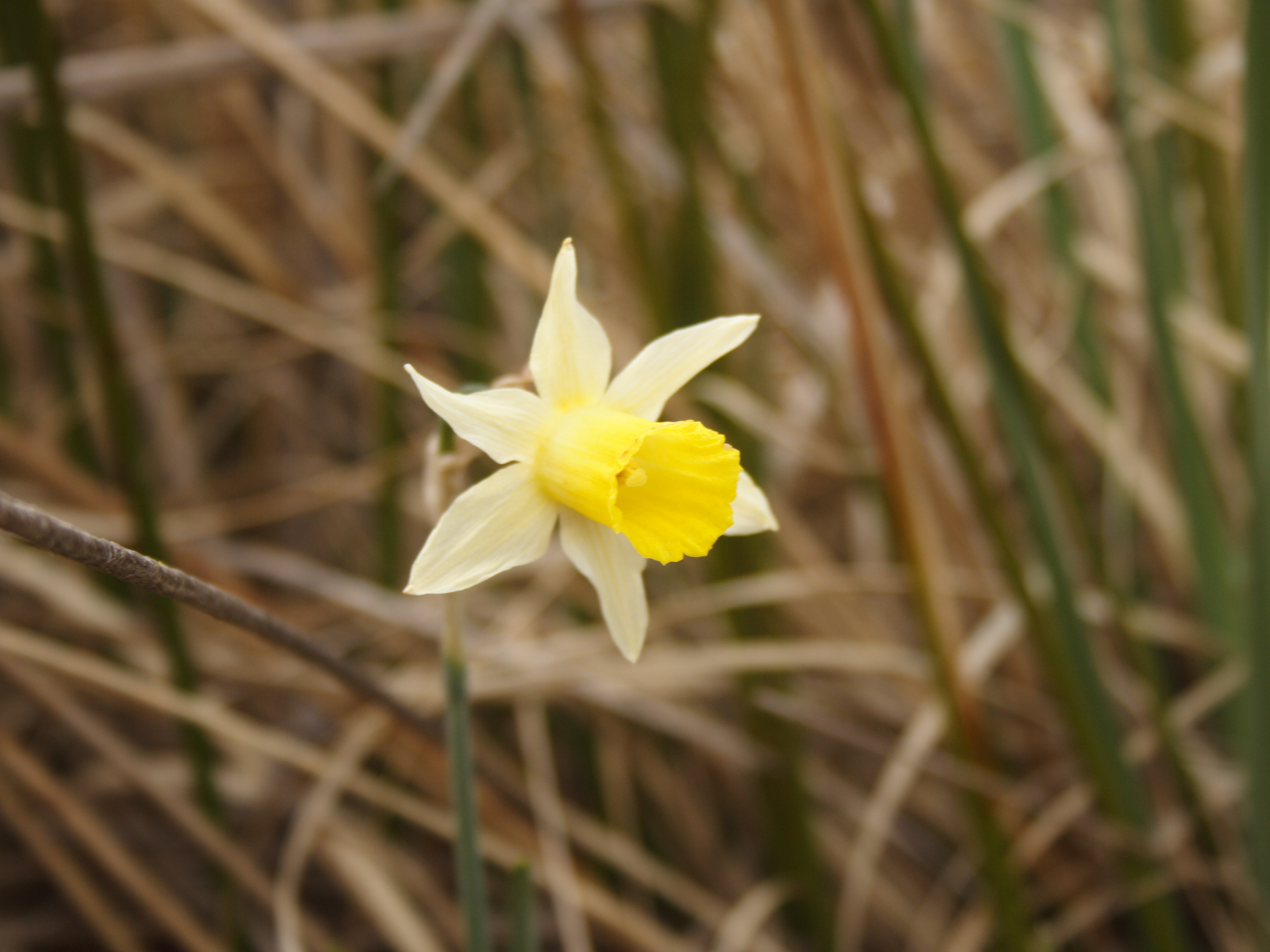

Conservation status
- Endangered (IUCN 3.1)

Scientific classification
- Kingdom: Plantae
- Clade: Tracheophytes
- Clade: Angiosperms
- Clade: Monocots
- Order: Asparagales
- Family: Amaryllidaceae
- Subfamily: Amaryllidoideae
- Genus: Narcissus
- Species: N. nevadensis

Binomial name
- Narcissus nevadensis Pugsley
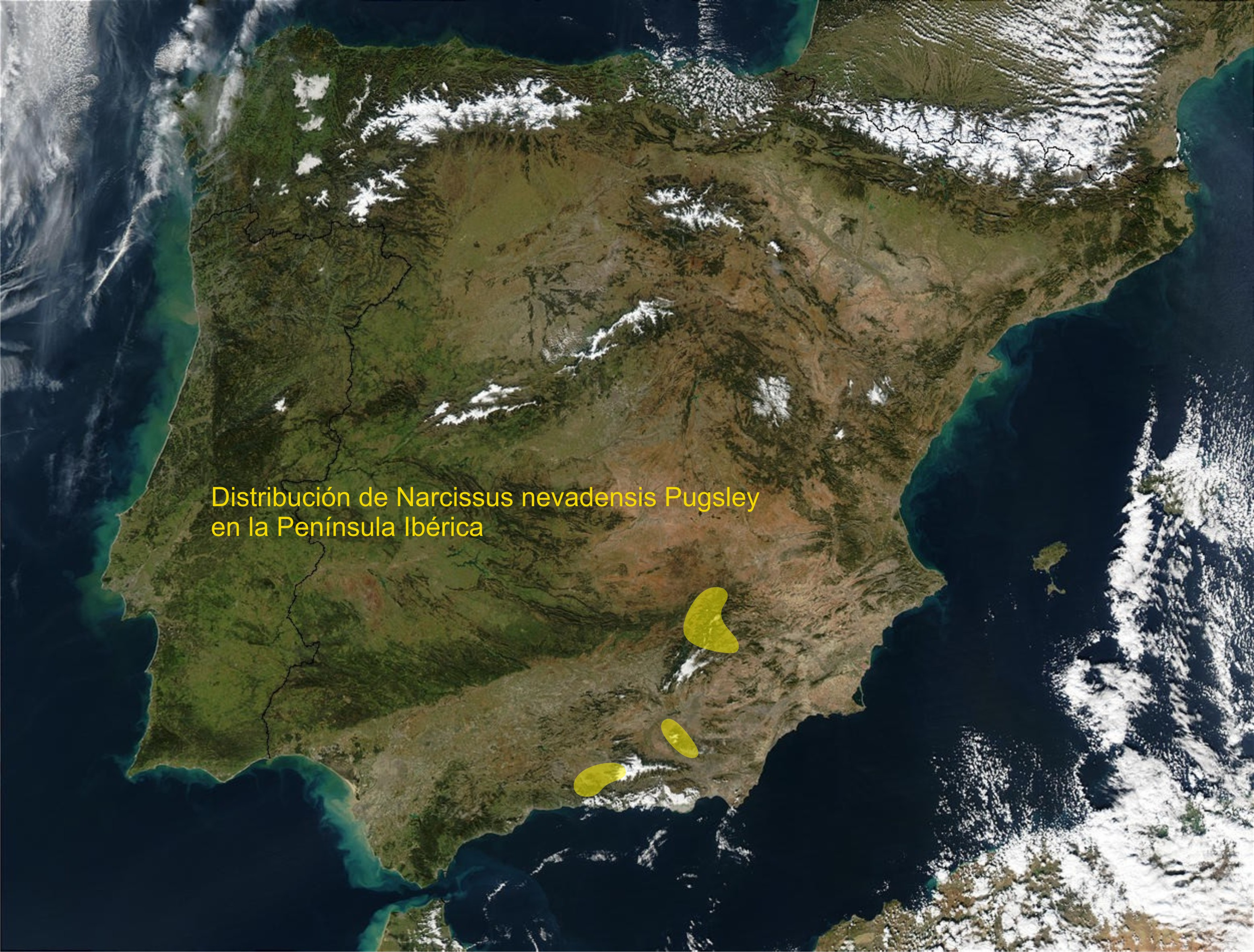
- Distribution range

Synonyms
- Narcissus pseudonarcissus subsp. nevadensis (Pugsley) A.Fern.

= Narcissus nevadensis =

Species of daffodil

Narcissus nevadensis is a species of the genus Narcissus (daffodils) in the family Amaryllidaceae. It is classified in Section Nevadensis. It is native to the Baetic System in Spain. It is considered an endangered species. In 1992 it was designated as a 'priority species' under Annex II of the Habitats Directive in the European Union, which means areas in which it occurs can be declared Special Areas of Conservation, if these areas belong to one of the number of habitats listed in Annex I of the directive.
