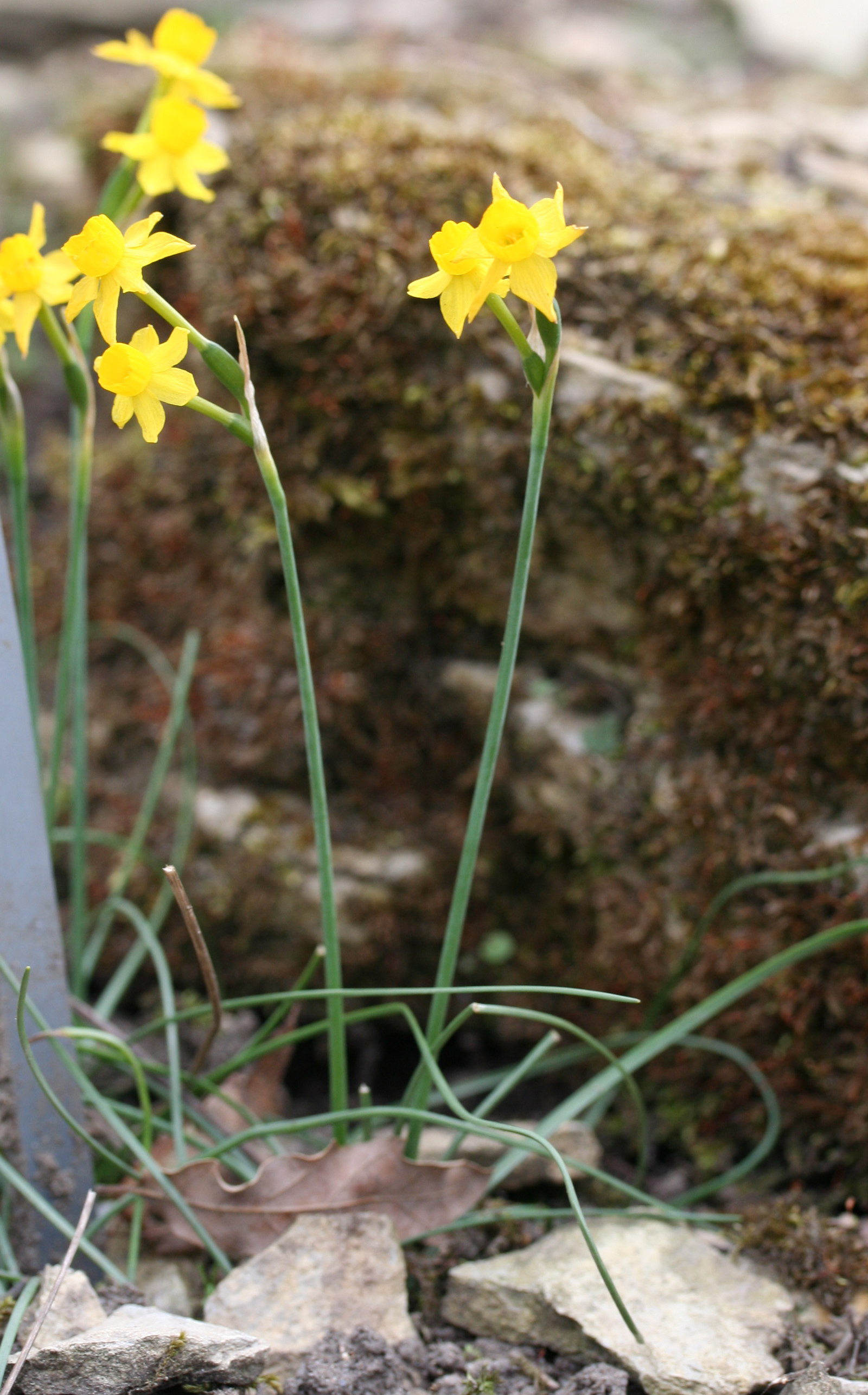

Conservation status
- Near Threatened (IUCN 3.1)

Scientific classification
- Kingdom: Plantae
- Clade: Tracheophytes
- Clade: Angiosperms
- Clade: Monocots
- Order: Asparagales
- Family: Amaryllidaceae
- Subfamily: Amaryllidoideae
- Genus: Narcissus
- Species: N. gaditanus

Binomial name
- Narcissus gaditanus Boiss. & Reut.
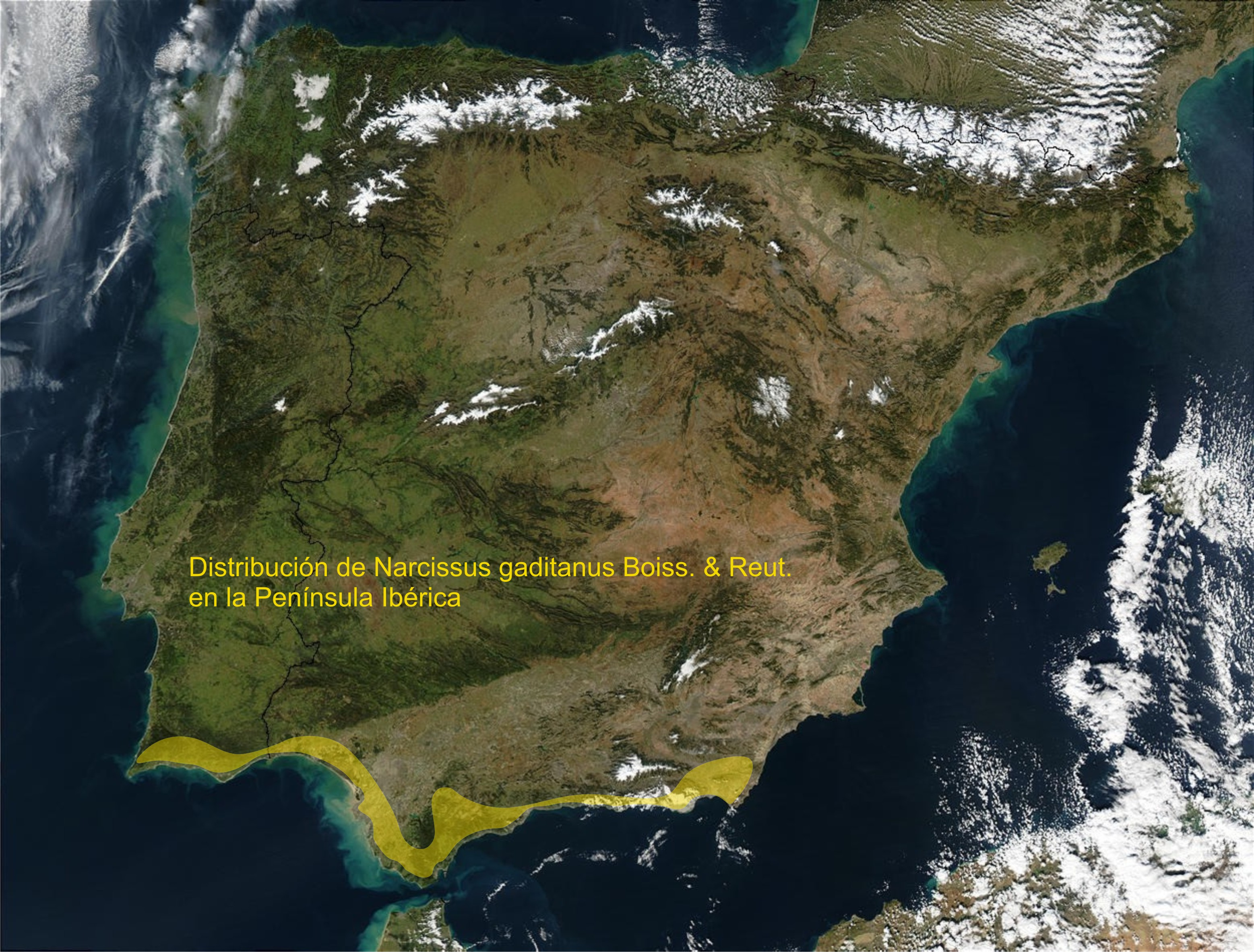
- Distribution range

Synonyms
- Narcissus assoanus subsp. gaditanus (Boiss. & Reut.) M.Salmon; Narcissus juncifolius subsp. gaditanus (Boiss. & Reut.) Baker; Narcissus juncifolius subsp. minutiflorus (Willk.) Baker; Narcissus juncifolius var. gaditanus (Boiss. & Reut.) Baker; Narcissus minutiflorus Willk. Narcissus pusillus G.Don; Queltia pusilla Herb.

= Narcissus gaditanus =

Species of plant in the amaryllis family

Narcissus gaditanus is a species of the genus Narcissus (daffodils) in the family Amaryllidaceae. It is classified in Section Juncifolii, and is native to the southern Iberian Peninsula.

== Etymology ==
The specific epithet, gaditanus, means "pertaining to Gades" (now Cádiz).
