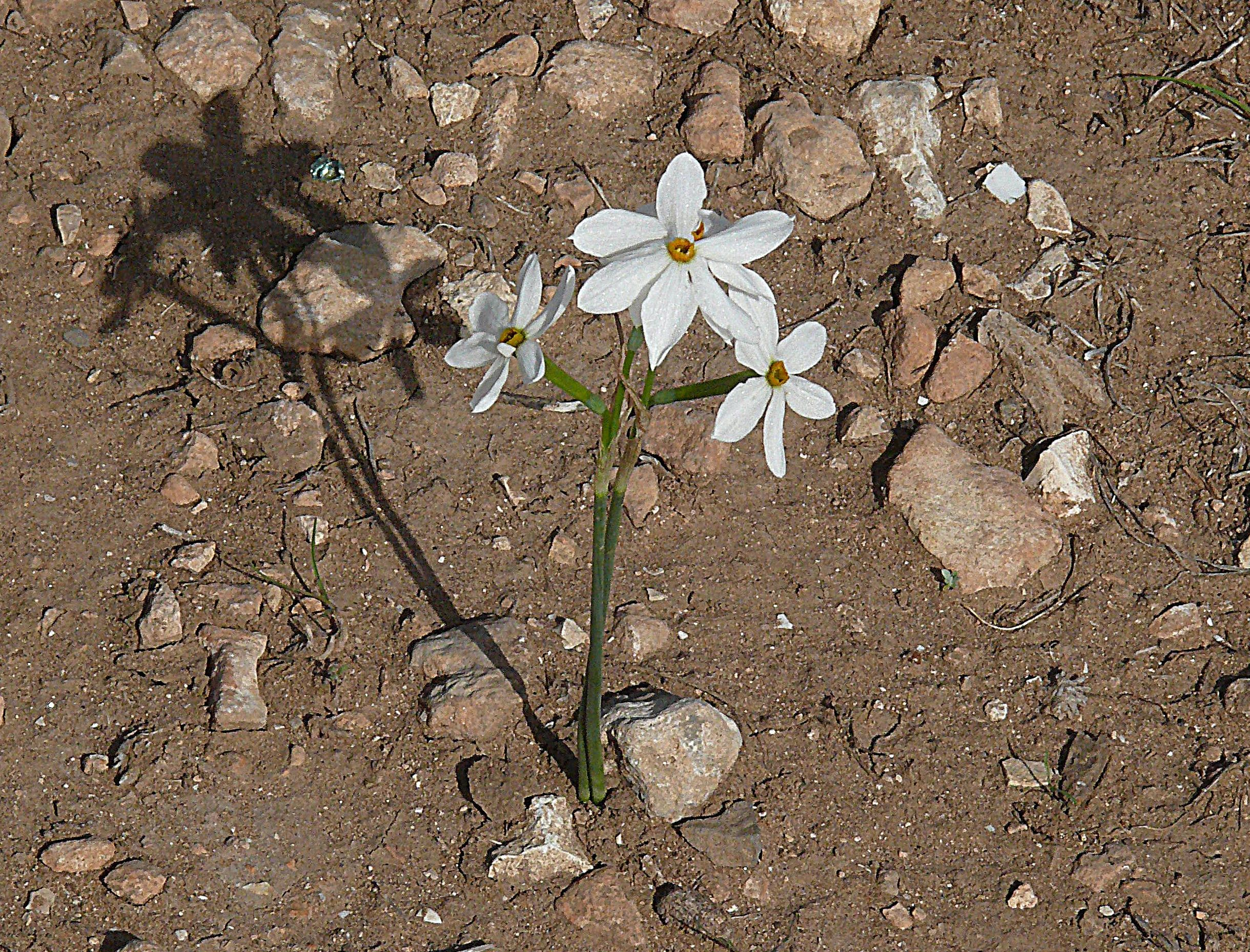

Scientific classification
- Kingdom: Plantae
- Clade: Tracheophytes
- Clade: Angiosperms
- Clade: Monocots
- Order: Asparagales
- Family: Amaryllidaceae
- Subfamily: Amaryllidoideae
- Genus: Narcissus
- Species: N. obsoletus

Binomial name
- Narcissus obsoletus (Haw.) Spach

Synonyms
- Narcissus miniatus Donn.-Morg., Koop. & Zonn.

= Narcissus obsoletus =

Species of daffodil

Narcissus obsoletus is a species of the genus Narcissus (daffodils) in the family Amaryllidaceae. It is classified in Section Serotini. It is native to the Mediterranean littoral from north Africa and the Iberian peninsula, east to Israel.

== Bibliography ==
- World checklist
