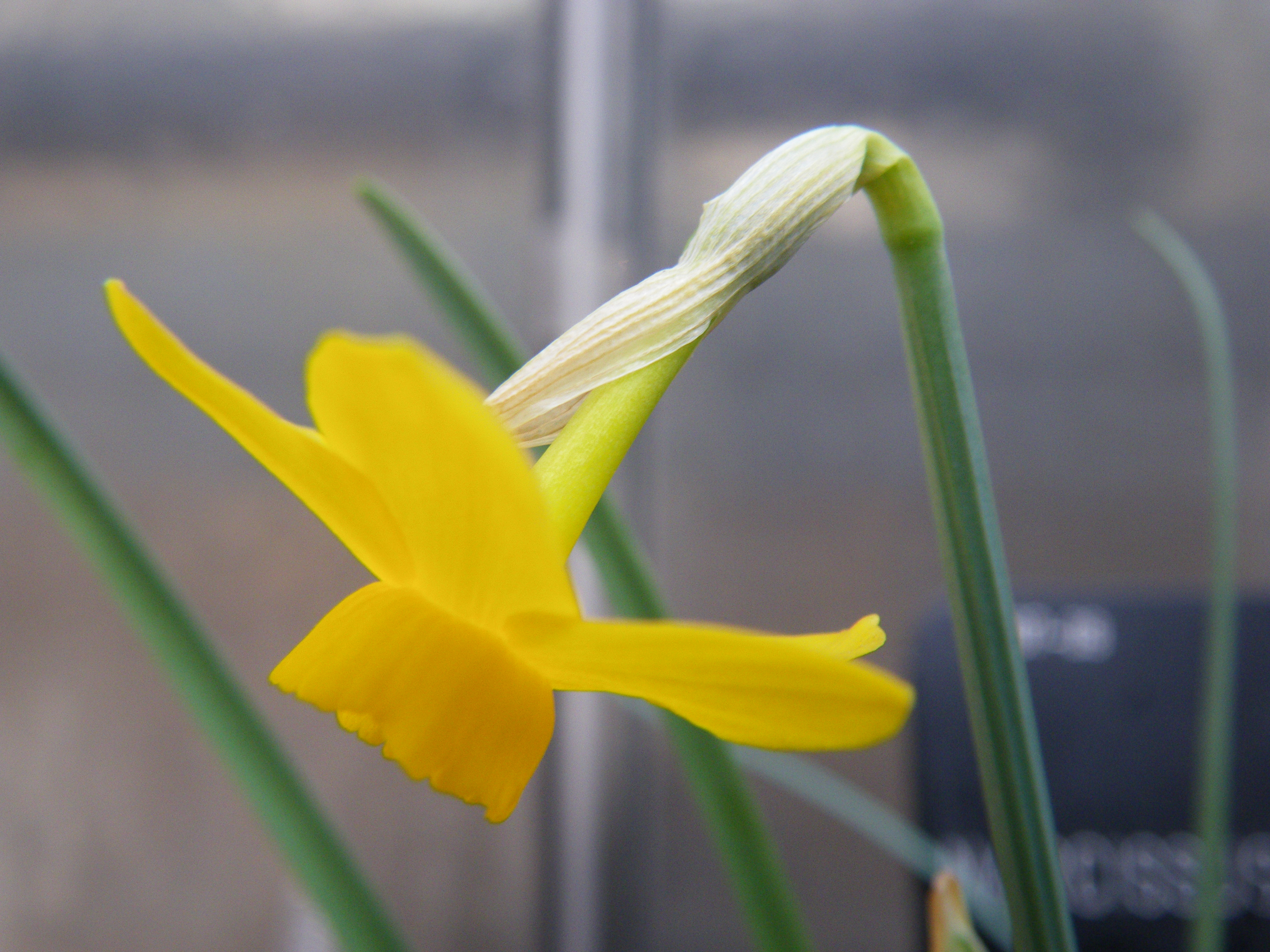

Scientific classification
- Kingdom: Plantae
- Clade: Tracheophytes
- Clade: Angiosperms
- Clade: Monocots
- Order: Asparagales
- Family: Amaryllidaceae
- Subfamily: Amaryllidoideae
- Genus: Narcissus
- Species: N. cuatrecasasii

Binomial name
- Narcissus cuatrecasasii Fern.Casas, M.Laínz & Ruíz Rejón
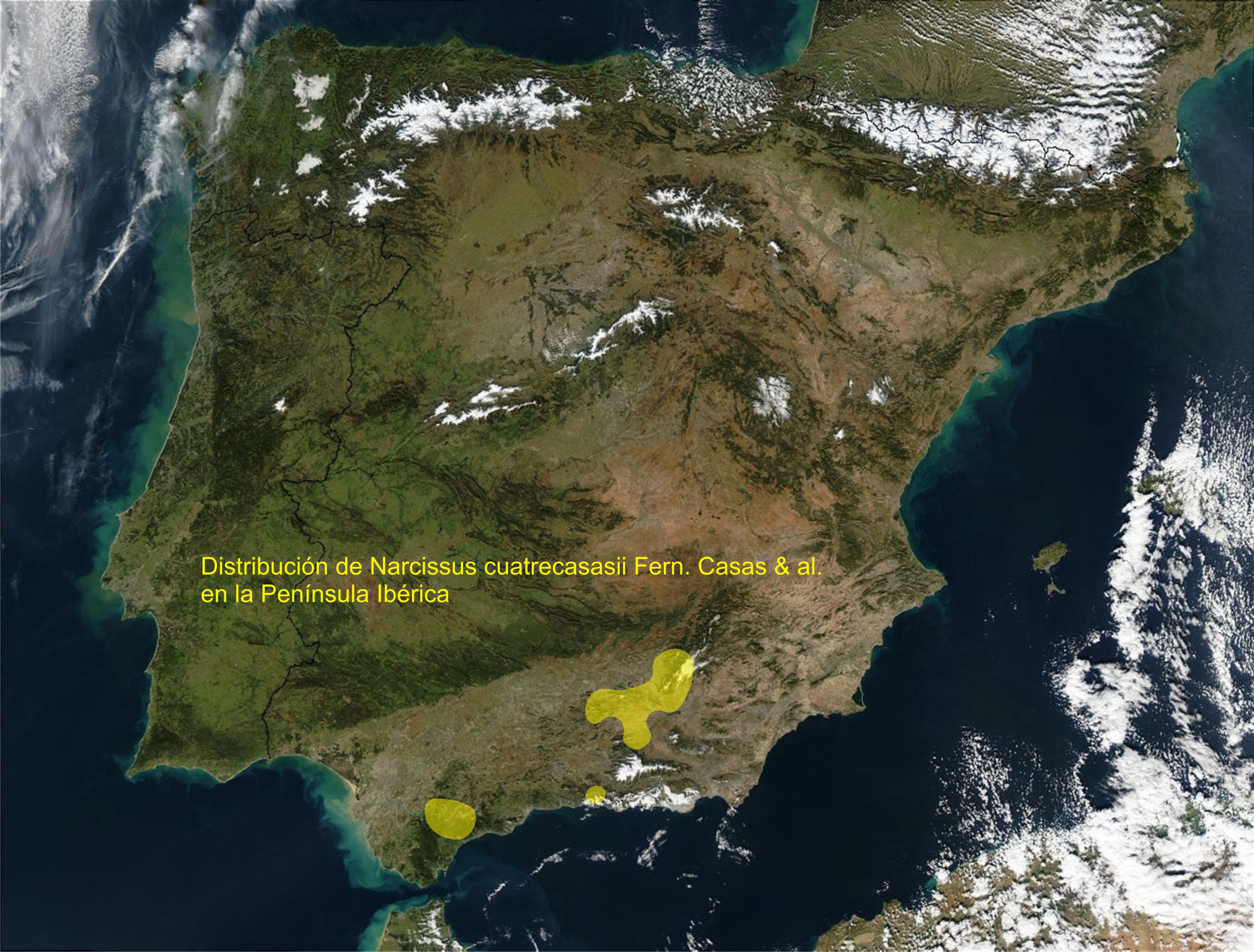
- Distribution range

Synonyms
- Narcissus rupicola subsp. pedunculatus Laínz ex Meikle

= Narcissus cuatrecasasii =

Species of daffodil

Narcissus cuatrecasasii is a species of the genus Narcissus (daffodils) in the family Amaryllidaceae. It is classified in Section Jonquilla. It is a native of the southern Iberian Peninsula.
