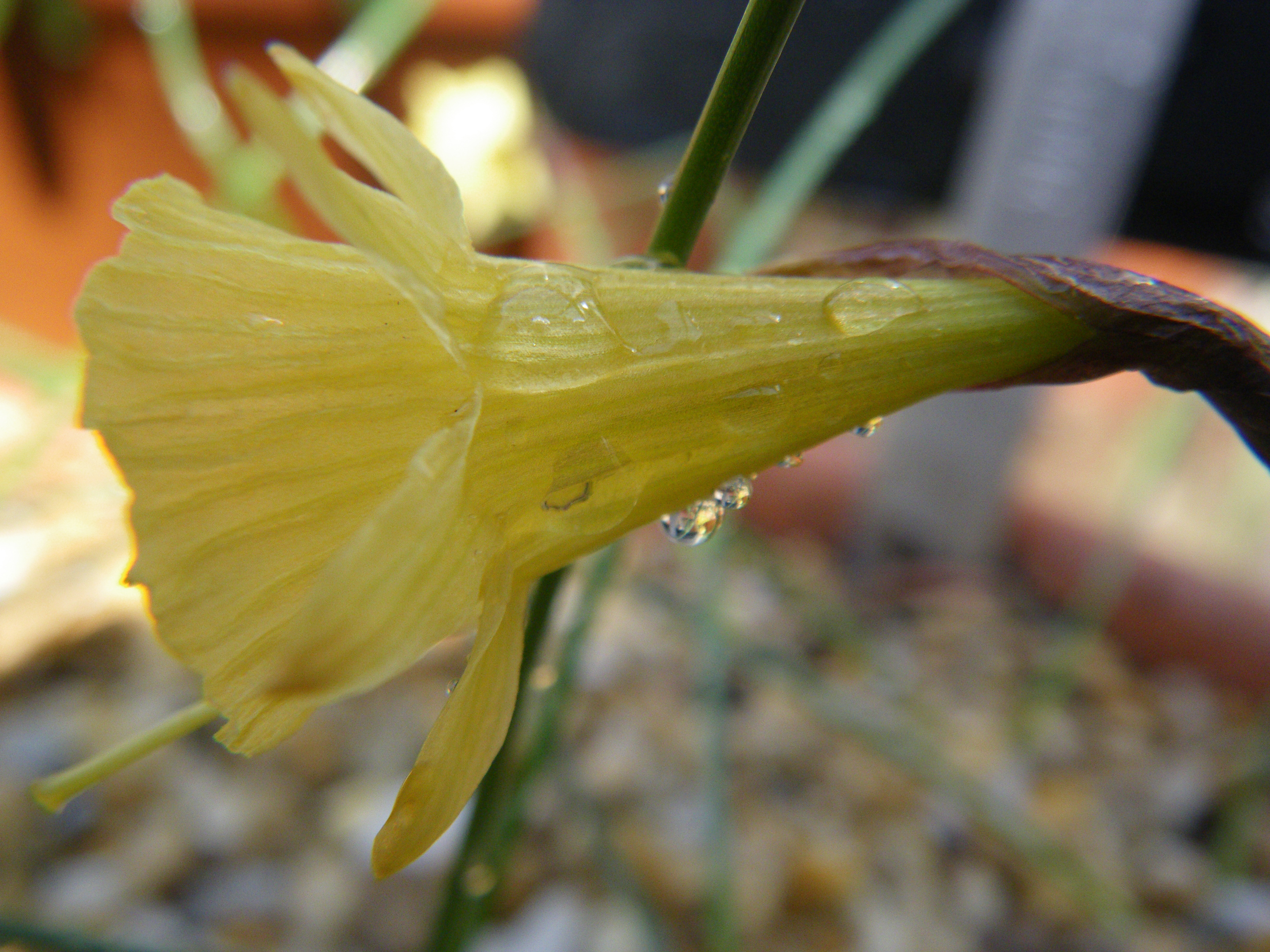

Conservation status
- Least Concern (IUCN 3.1)

Scientific classification
- Kingdom: Plantae
- Clade: Tracheophytes
- Clade: Angiosperms
- Clade: Monocots
- Order: Asparagales
- Family: Amaryllidaceae
- Subfamily: Amaryllidoideae
- Genus: Narcissus
- Species: N. hedraeanthus

Binomial name
- Narcissus hedraeanthus (Webb & Heldr.) Colmeiro
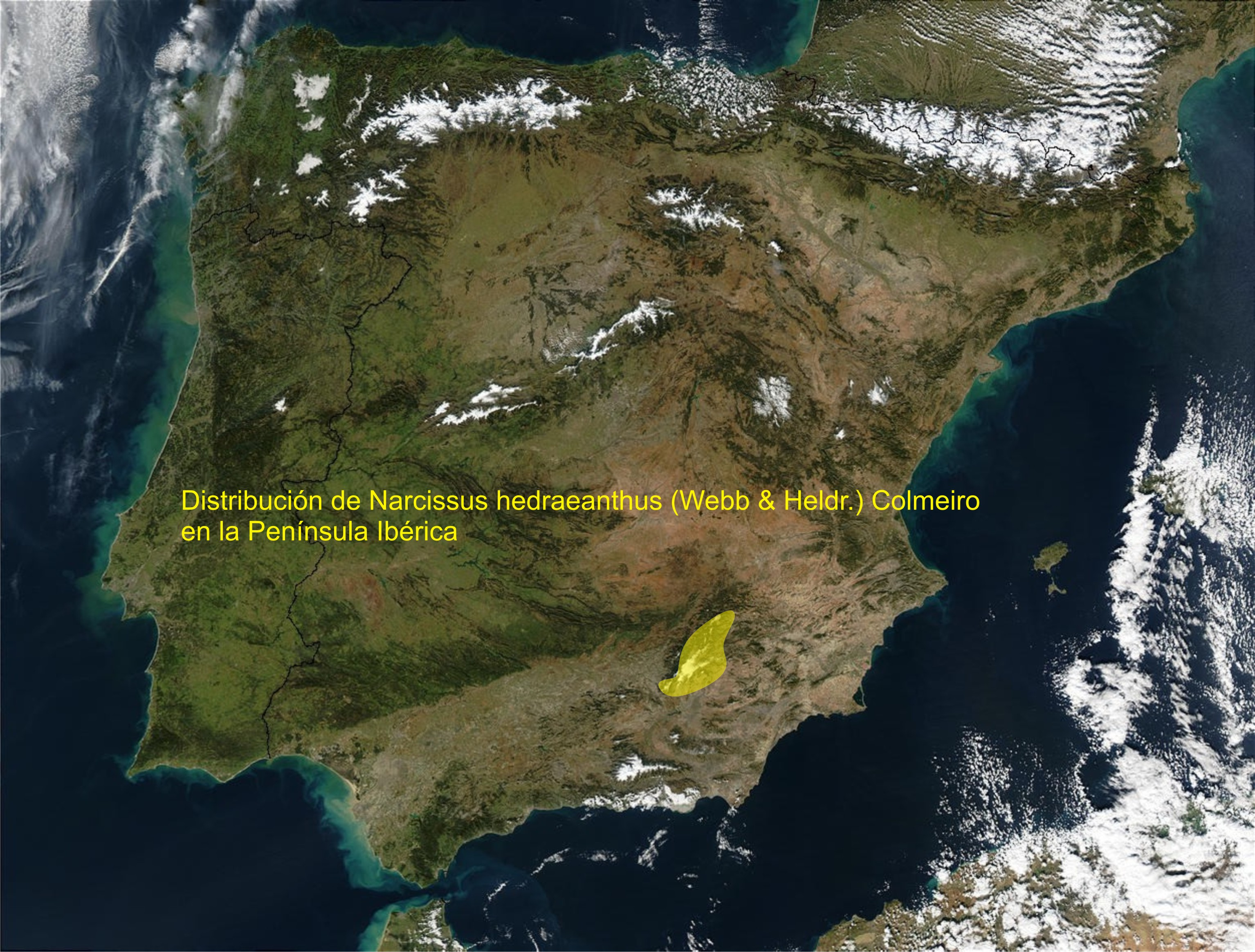
- Distribution range

Synonyms
- Corbularia hedraeantha Webb & Heldr.; Narcissus bulbocodium var. hedraeanthus (Webb & Heldr.) Baker; Narcissus bulbocodium subsp. hedraeanthus (Webb & Heldr.) K.Richt.; Narcissus cantabricus subsp. hedraeanthus (Webb & Heldr.) Fern.Casas

= Narcissus hedraeanthus =

Species of daffodil

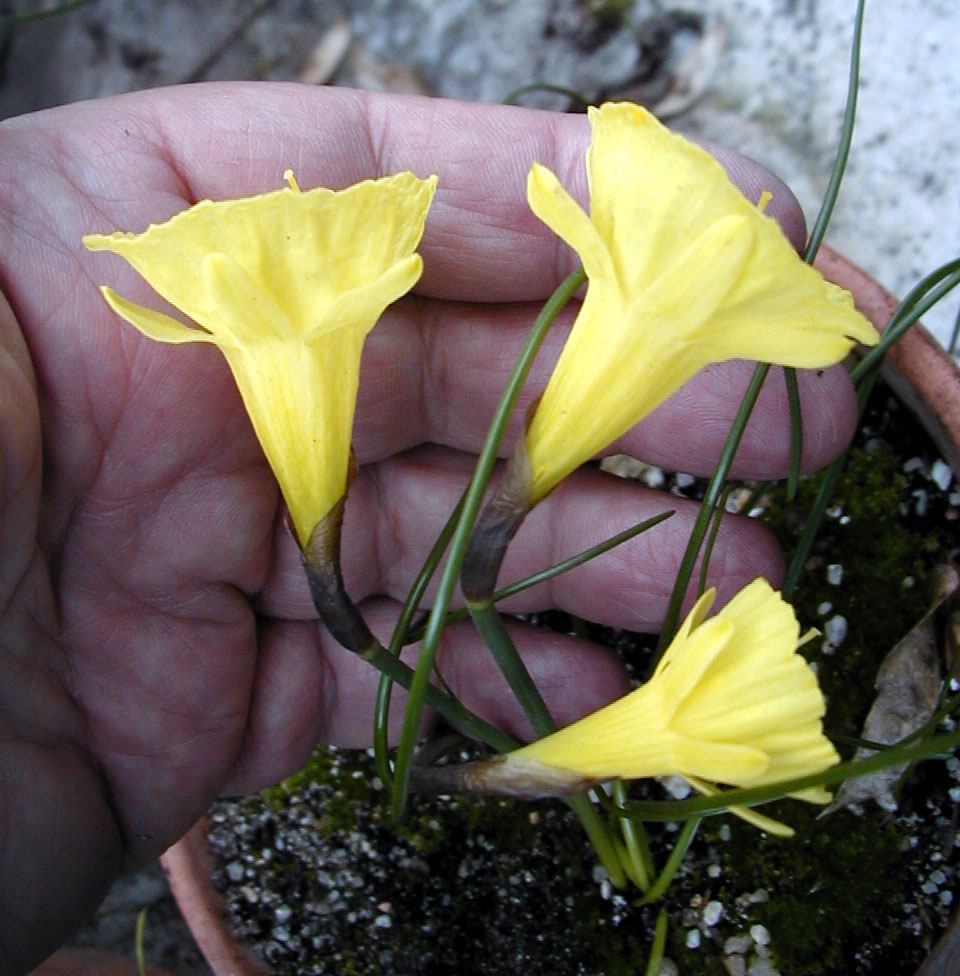

Narcissus hedraeanthus is a species of flowering plant in the family Amaryllidaceae. It is classified in Section Bulbocodium, and is among the smallest species in that genus. It flowers in December.

== Description ==
Narcissus hedraeanthus is 5 – 8 cm in height, the sessile flowers which are up facing and pale yellow have a perianth 5 mm wide with a corona 7 mm by 10 mm. The exserted stamens are orange. The flowers are fragrant.

== Distribution ==
The natural distribution range is the Sierra de Cazorla in Spain.

== Bibliography ==
- John W. Blanchard: Narcissus. A Guide to Wild Daffodils, Alpine Garden Society, Woking 1990.
- Dumont's Gartenhandbuch: Blumenzwiebeln und Knollen, Dumont Buchverlag, Köln 1998, ISBN 3-7701-4336-1.
- Walter Erhardt: Narzissen - Osterglocken, Jonquillen, Tazetten, Ulmer Verlag, Stuttgart 1993, ISBN 3-8001-6489-2.
