= Narcissus moleroi =

Scientific classification
- Kingdom: Plantae
- Clade: Tracheophytes
- Clade: Angiosperms
- Clade: Monocots
- Order: Asparagales
- Family: Amaryllidaceae
- Subfamily: Amaryllidoideae
- Genus: Narcissus
- Species: N. moleroi

Binomial name
- Narcissus moleroi Fern.Casas
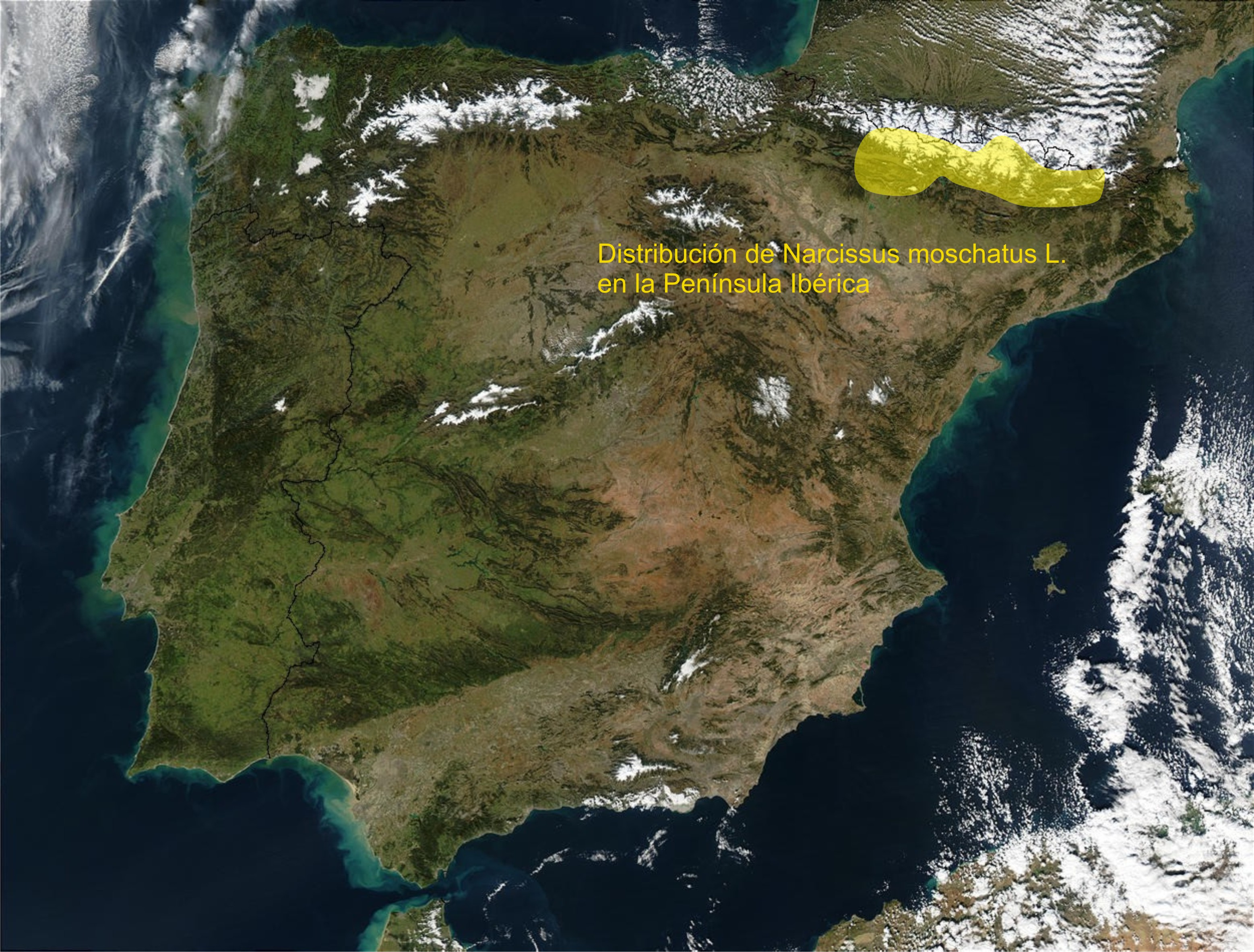
- Distribution range of Narcissus moleroi and N. pseudonarcissus subsp. moschatus

Species of daffodil

Narcissus moleroi is a species of the genus Narcissus (daffodils) in the family Amaryllidaceae. It is classified in Section Pseudonarcissus. It is native to eastern Spain.

== Description ==
The flowers are pale yellow.

== Bibliography ==
- "Narcissus moleroi". Tropicos.org. Missouri Botanical Garden.
- Narcissus moleroi The Plant List
- Narcissus moleroi World Checklist
- Flora Catalana Narcissus moleroi (image)
