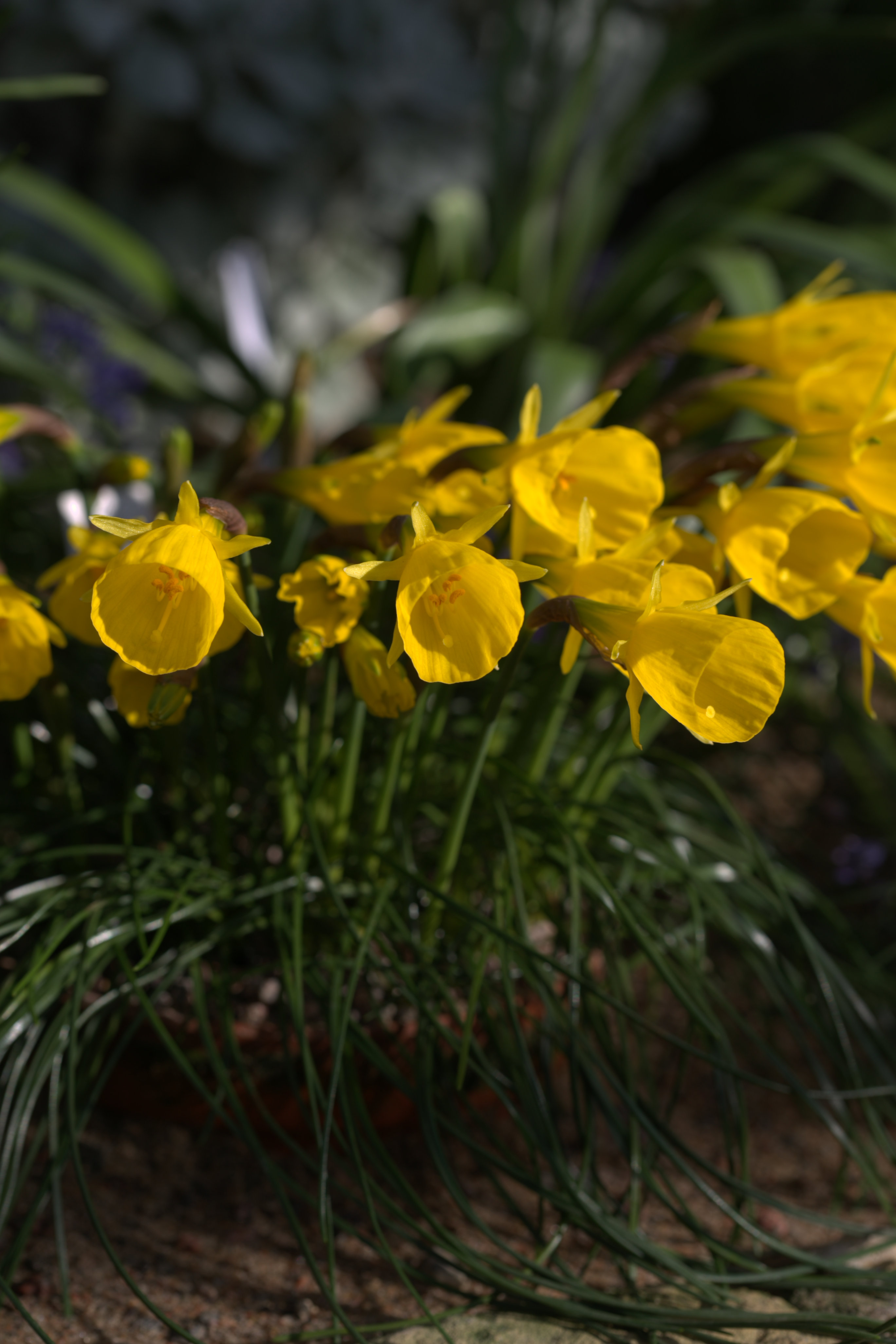

Scientific classification
- Kingdom: Plantae
- Clade: Tracheophytes
- Clade: Angiosperms
- Clade: Monocots
- Order: Asparagales
- Family: Amaryllidaceae
- Subfamily: Amaryllidoideae
- Genus: Narcissus
- Species: N. obesus

Binomial name
- Narcissus obesus Salisb.
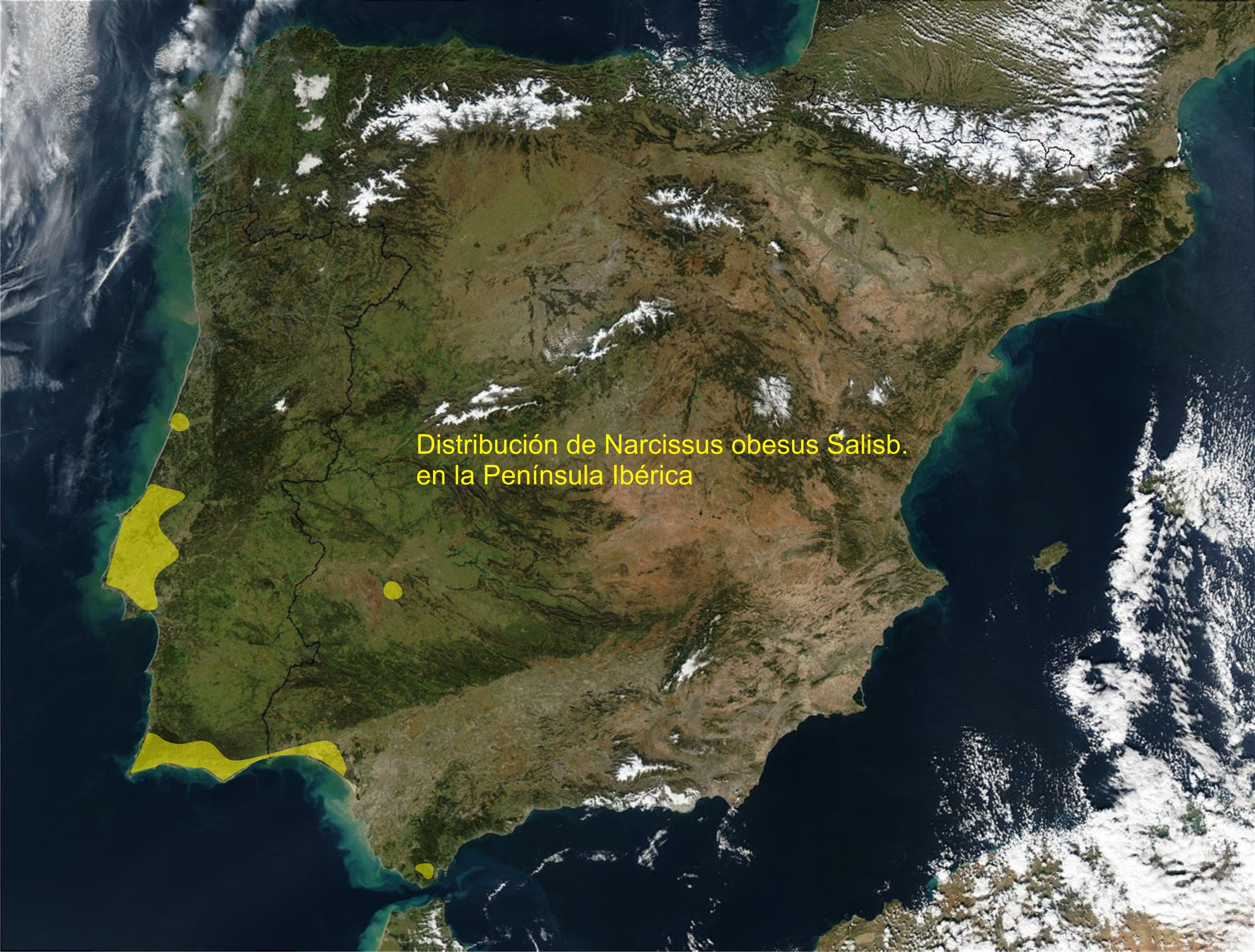
- Distribution range

Synonyms
- Narcissus bulbocodium subsp. obesus (Salisb.) Maire

= Narcissus obesus =

Species of daffodil

Narcissus obesus is a species of the genus Narcissus (Daffodils) in the family Amaryllidaceae. It is classified in Section Bulbocodium. It is native to Spain, Portugal and Morocco.

== Description ==
Flowers solitary, horizontal to erect, floral tube and tepals yellow.

== Distribution and habitat ==
Rocky cliffs, dunes and meadows, calcareous or acid soil.
