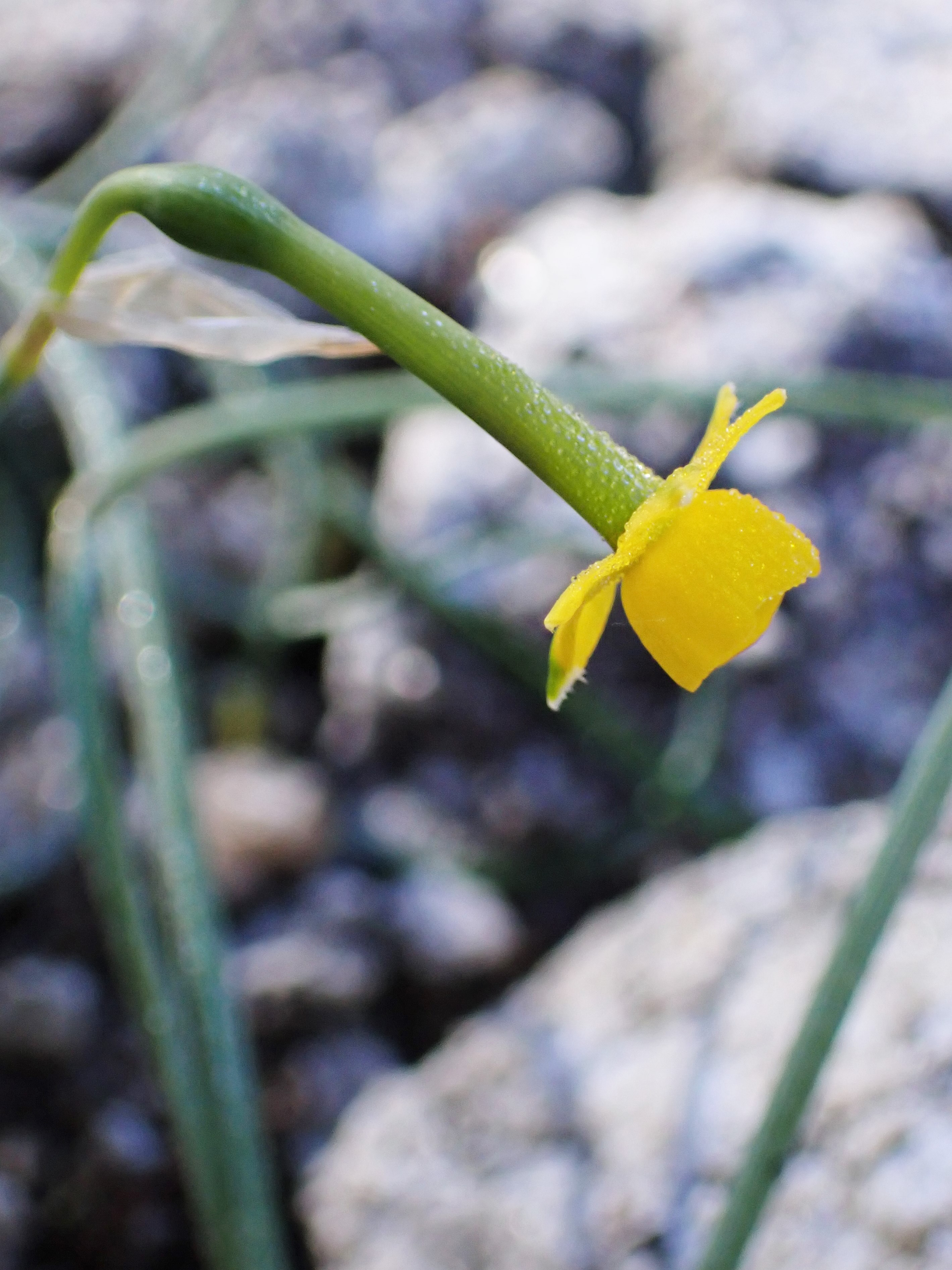

Scientific classification
- Kingdom: Plantae
- Clade: Tracheophytes
- Clade: Angiosperms
- Clade: Monocots
- Order: Asparagales
- Family: Amaryllidaceae
- Subfamily: Amaryllidoideae
- Genus: Narcissus
- Species: N. scaberulus

Binomial name
- Narcissus scaberulus Henriq.
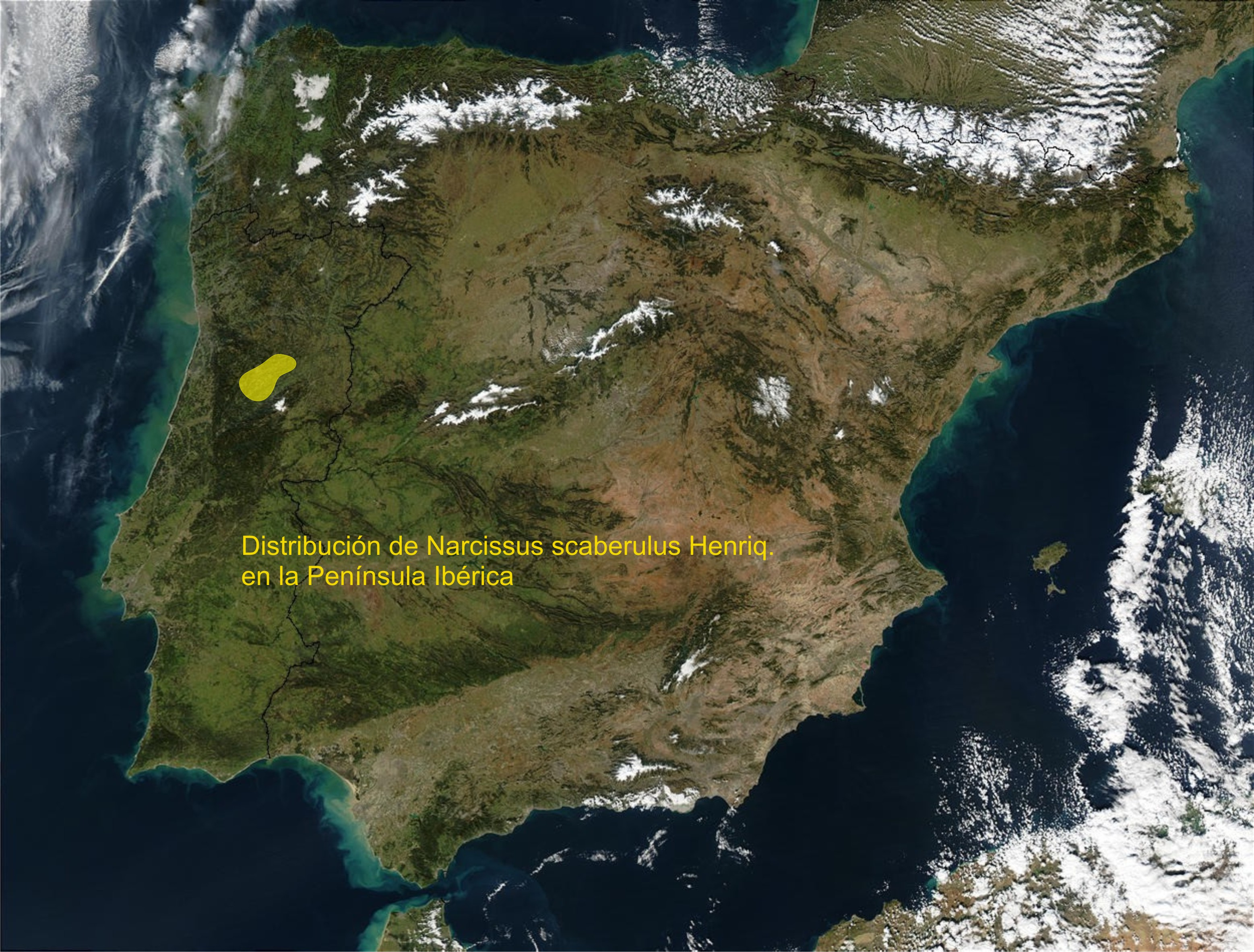
- Distribution range

= Narcissus scaberulus =

Species of daffodil

Narcissus scaberulus is a species of the genus Narcissus (daffodils) in the family Amaryllidaceae. It is classified in Section Apodanthi. It is native to Portugal.
