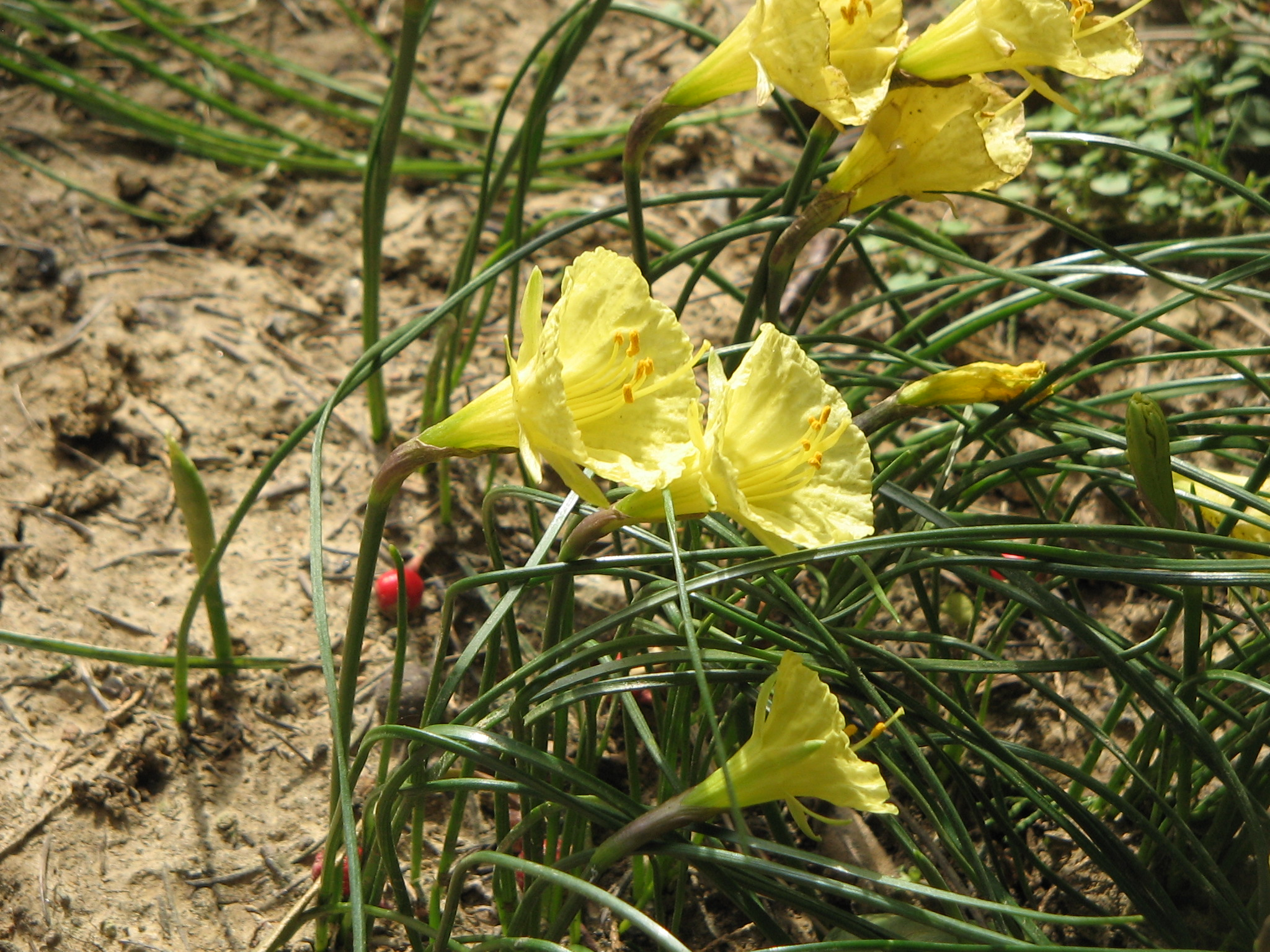

Scientific classification
- Kingdom: Plantae
- Clade: Tracheophytes
- Clade: Angiosperms
- Clade: Monocots
- Order: Asparagales
- Family: Amaryllidaceae
- Subfamily: Amaryllidoideae
- Genus: Narcissus
- Species: N. romieuxii

Binomial name
- Narcissus romieuxii Braun-Blanq. & Maire

Synonyms
- Narcissus bulbocodium subsp. romieuxii (Braun-Blanq. & Maire) Emb. & Maire

= Narcissus romieuxii =

Species of daffodil

Narcissus romieuxii is a species of flowering plant in the family Amaryllidaceae. It is a distinctive, early-flowering daffodil with dark green rush-like foliage. The flowers have narrow perianth segments, while the trumpet is wide and flaring. It blooms in mid to late winter. There are many subspecies and cultivars, with flowers in many shades of white and yellow. It originated in the Atlas Mountains region of Morocco.

The Latin specific epithet romieuxii honours the French botanist Henri Auguste Romieux (1857-1937).

Narcissus romieuxii has gained the Royal Horticultural Society's Award of Garden Merit.

== Subspecies ==
Several varieties and subspecies have been proposed. The following three are widely accepted:

- Narcissus romieuxii subsp. albidus (Emb. & Maire) A.Fern.
- Narcissus romieuxii subsp. jacquemoudii (Fern.Casas) Zonn.
- Narcissus romieuxii subsp. romieuxii
