= Narcissus deficiens =

Scientific classification
- Kingdom: Plantae
- Clade: Tracheophytes
- Clade: Angiosperms
- Clade: Monocots
- Order: Asparagales
- Family: Amaryllidaceae
- Subfamily: Amaryllidoideae
- Genus: Narcissus
- Species: N. deficiens

Binomial name
- Narcissus deficiens Herb.

Synonyms
- Hermione deficiens (Herb.) Kunth; Narcissus miniatus subsp. orientalis M.Salmon, without indication of the type.; Narcissus miniatus Donn.-Morg., Koop. & Zonn.; Narcissus serotinus subsp. deficiens (Herb.) K.Richt.; Narcissus serotinus var. deficiens (Herb.) Baker

Species of plant

Narcissus deficiens is a species of flowering plant in the family Amaryllidaceae, native to the Mediterranean basin. It was first described by William Herbert in 1847.
