= Narcissus albimarginatus =

Scientific classification
- Kingdom: Plantae
- Clade: Tracheophytes
- Clade: Angiosperms
- Clade: Monocots
- Order: Asparagales
- Family: Amaryllidaceae
- Subfamily: Amaryllidoideae
- Genus: Narcissus
- Species: N. albimarginatus

Binomial name
- Narcissus albimarginatus Müll.-Doblies & U.Müll.-Doblies

Species of daffodil

Narcissus albimarginatus is a species of the genus Narcissus (daffodils) in the family Amaryllidaceae. It is classified in Section Apodanthi , and is endemic to Morocco.
