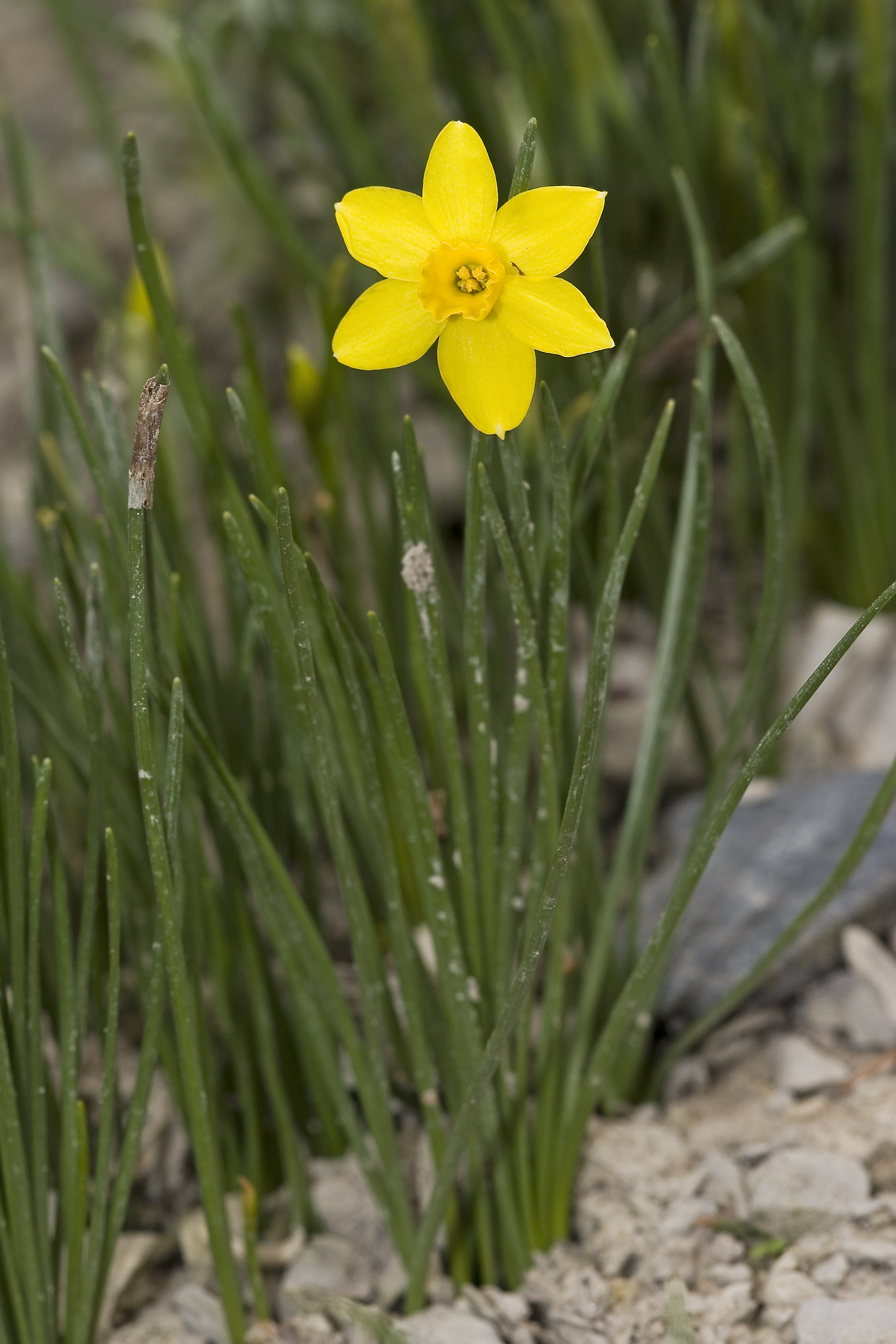

Scientific classification
- Kingdom: Plantae
- Clade: Tracheophytes
- Clade: Angiosperms
- Clade: Monocots
- Order: Asparagales
- Family: Amaryllidaceae
- Subfamily: Amaryllidoideae
- Genus: Narcissus
- Species: N. assoanus

Binomial name
- Narcissus assoanus Dufour ex Schult. & Schult.f.

Subspecies
- Narcissus assoanus subsp. assoanus; Narcissus assoanus subsp. baeticus (Fern.Casas) Barra, Díez Domínguez & Ureña; Narcissus assoanus subsp. praelongus Barra & G.López; Narcissus assoanus subsp. rivas-martinezii (Fern.Casas) Barra, Díez Domínguez & Ureña
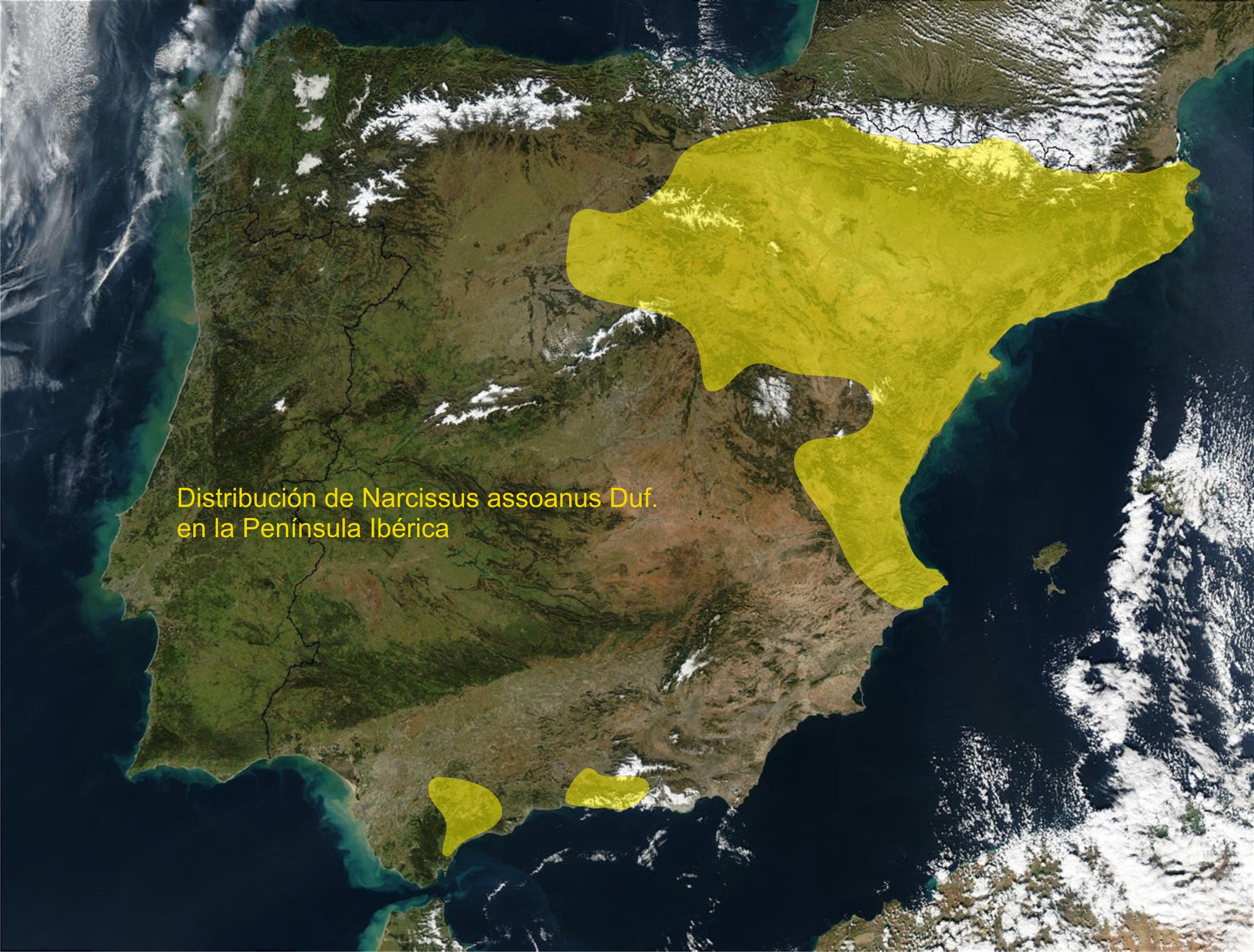
- Distribution range

Synonyms
- Narcissus assoi Dufour ex Graells; Narcissus herminicus Link ex Willk. & Lange; Narcissus juncifolius var. assoanus (Dufour ex Schult. & Schult.f.) Nyman; Narcissus × odorus subsp. assoanus (Dufour ex Schult. & Schult.f.) K.Richt.; Narcissus parvulus Sweet; Narcissus requienii M.Roem.; Queltia assoana (Dufour ex Schult. & Schult.f.) Kunth

= Narcissus assoanus =

Rush-leaf jonquil

Species of daffodil

Narcissus assoanus, the rush-leaf jonquil, is a perennial bulbous plant native to Spain and France; it is now naturalized in Turkey. It grows to 15 cm (6 in) in height and has yellow flowers with a slightly lemony fragrance. Subspecies include N. assoanus subsp. assoanus and N. assoanus subsp. praelongus.

== Bibliography ==
- "Narcissus assoanus". Germplasm Resources Information Network. Agricultural Research Service, United States Department of Agriculture.
- "Rushleaf jonquil". uBio.
- Brickell, Christopher (1996). Gardener's Encyclopedia of Plants & Flowers. Colour Library Books. p. 518. ISBN 1-85833-472-1.
- Flora Catalana Narcissus assoanus Archived 2016-03-04 at the Wayback Machine
