= Narcissus blanchardii =

Scientific classification
- Kingdom: Plantae
- Clade: Tracheophytes
- Clade: Angiosperms
- Clade: Monocots
- Order: Asparagales
- Family: Amaryllidaceae
- Subfamily: Amaryllidoideae
- Genus: Narcissus
- Species: N. blanchardii

Binomial name
- Narcissus blanchardii Zonn.

Synonyms
- Narcissus flavus Lag.; Narcissus fernandesii var. major A.Fern.

Species of daffodil

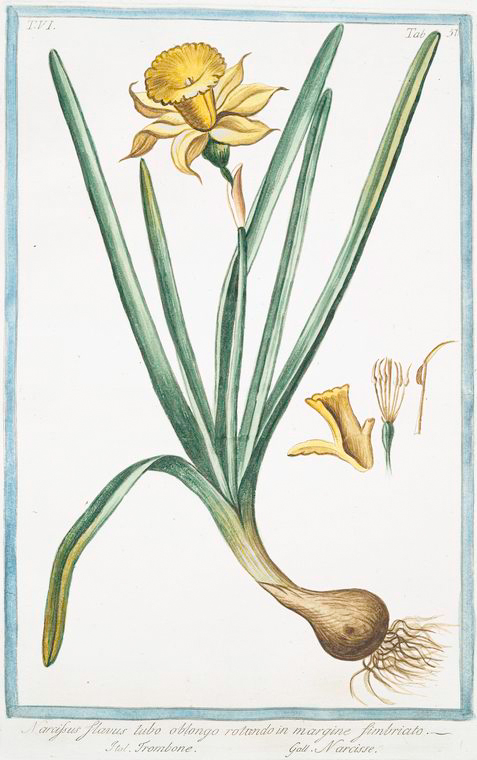
Narcissus flavus, in Hortus Romanus plantaru (1772-1793)

Narcissus blanchardii is a species of the genus Narcissus (daffodils) in the family Amaryllidaceae. It is classified in Section Jonquilla.

== Taxonomy ==
Established as a separate species by Zonneveld in 2008, based on Narcissus fernandesii var. major A.Fern., but with rather a complicated taxonomic history. However The Plant List prefers Narcissus flavus as the accepted name. Akers suggests this is because Flora Iberica gives the latter term precedence (1816). Zonneveld himself, takes issue with this maintaining N. blanchardii as the correct name.

== Distribution ==
South central Portugal to central and south west Spain.
