= Narcissus bujei =

Conservation status
- Endangered (IUCN 3.1)

Scientific classification
- Kingdom: Plantae
- Clade: Tracheophytes
- Clade: Angiosperms
- Clade: Monocots
- Order: Asparagales
- Family: Amaryllidaceae
- Subfamily: Amaryllidoideae
- Genus: Narcissus
- Species: N. bujei

Binomial name
- Narcissus bujei Fern. Casas

Species of daffodil

Narcissus bujei is a species of the genus Narcissus (daffodils) in the family Amaryllidaceae. It is classified in Section Nevadensis. The flower is a plain yellow. It is native to the Andalusia region of Spain, in particular the Comarca of Subbética (Córdoba) and the Sierra de las Nieves in the Serranía de Ronda (Málaga). It is considered an endangered species. Its preferred habitat is calcareous soils in small forests and irrigated land.

== Taxonomy ==
Narcissus bujei has had a chequered history. It is considered an ancient hybrid of N. pseudonarcissus where they overlap with species from Nevadensis. It was first described as N. longispathus var. bujei Fern. Casas, then as a variety of N. hispanicus, then a subspecies of N. hispanicus and then as a separate species, all by Fernandez Casas at various times. Although still listed as a synonym of N. longispathus on the World Checklist, its species rank was confirmed by Zonneveld on the basis of DNA content (30 vs. 36 pg) and included in the new Section Nevadensis, distinct from Pseudonarcissus, being from southern Spain with a DNA content of 30–39 pg.

An alternative spelling of Narcissus bugei is accepted.

== Bibliography ==
- Zonneveld, B. J. M. (2008). "The systematic value of nuclear DNA content for all species of Narcissus L. (Amaryllidaceae)". Plant Systematics and Evolution. 275 (1–2): 109–132. doi:10.1007/s00606-008-0015-1. hdl:1887/13962.
- Narcissus bujei Tropicos
- Narcissus bujei Plant List
