= Narcissus primigenius =

Scientific classification
- Kingdom: Plantae
- Clade: Tracheophytes
- Clade: Angiosperms
- Clade: Monocots
- Order: Asparagales
- Family: Amaryllidaceae
- Subfamily: Amaryllidoideae
- Genus: Narcissus
- Species: N. primigenius

Binomial name
- Narcissus primigenius (Fern.Suárez ex M.Laínz) Fern.Casas & Laínz
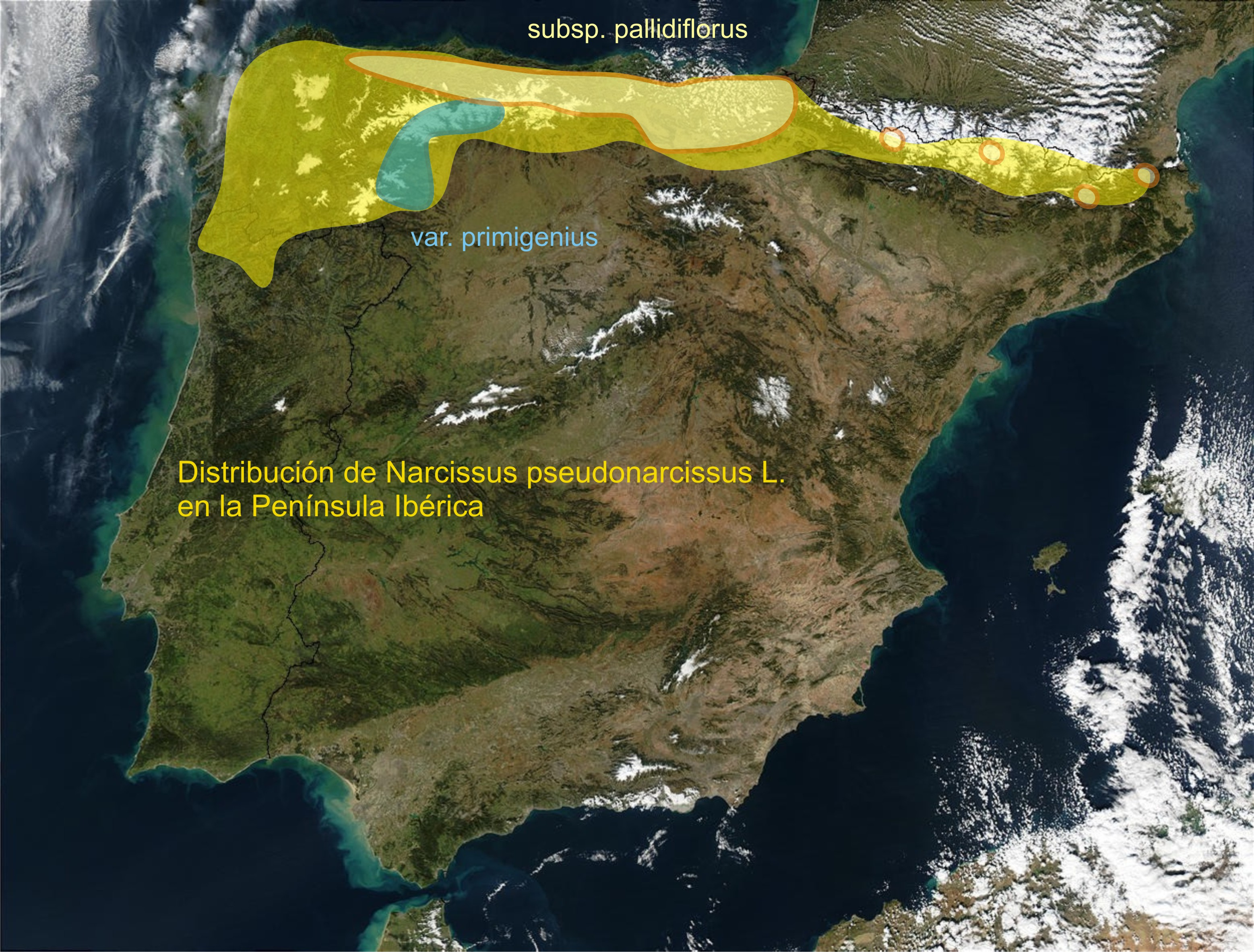
- Distribution range of subspecies of N. pseudonarcissus in Spain

Synonyms
- Narcissus fontqueri Fern.Casas & Rivas Ponce; Narcissus pseudonarcissus var. primigenius Fern.Suárez ex M.Laínz; Narcissus pseudonarcissus subsp. primigenius (Fern.Suárez ex M.Laínz) Fern.Casas & Laínz

Species of daffodil

Narcissus primigenius is a species of the genus Narcissus (Daffodils) in the family Amaryllidaceae. It is classified in Section Pseudonarcissus. It is native to northwest Spain.

== Bibliography ==
- "Narcissus primigenius". Tropicos.org. Missouri Botanical Garden.
- Narcissus primigenius The Plant List
- Narcissus primigenius World Checklist
- Zonneveld, B. J. M. (24 September 2008). "The systematic value of nuclear DNA content for all species of Narcissus L. (Amaryllidaceae)". Plant Systematics and Evolution. 275 (1–2): 109–132. doi:10.1007/s00606-008-0015-1. hdl:1887/13962.
