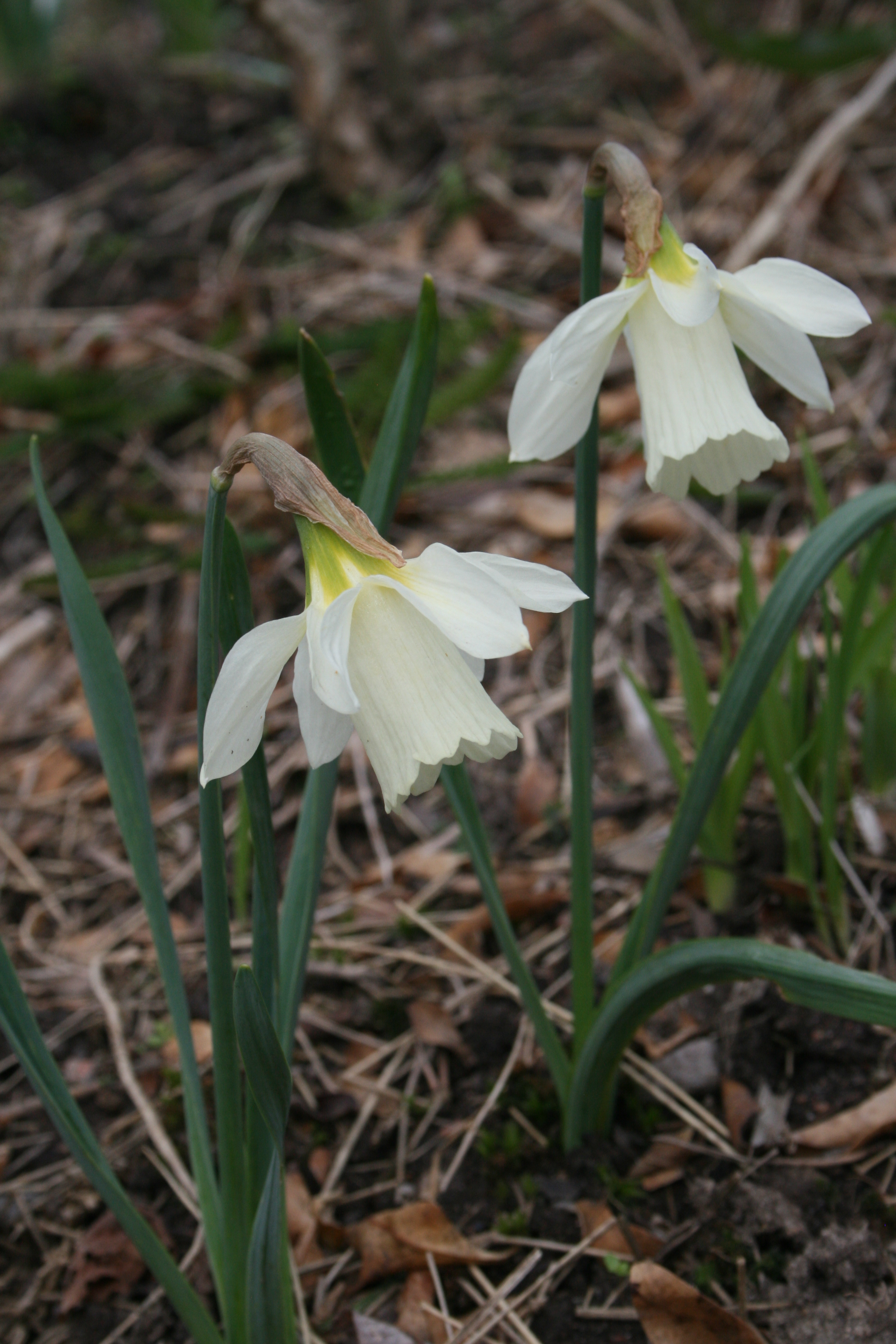

Scientific classification
- Kingdom: Plantae
- Clade: Tracheophytes
- Clade: Angiosperms
- Clade: Monocots
- Order: Asparagales
- Family: Amaryllidaceae
- Subfamily: Amaryllidoideae
- Genus: Narcissus
- Species: N. moschatus

Binomial name
- Narcissus moschatus L.

Synonyms
- List: Ajax albicans Haw.; Ajax albus Haw.; Ajax albus var. albens Haw.; Ajax cernuus Haw.; Ajax moschatus (L.) Haw.; Ajax tortuosus (Haw.) Haw.; Hermione candida M.Roem.; Moskerion moschatum (L.) Raf.; Narcissus albescens Pugsley; Narcissus albidus Heynh.; Narcissus alpestris Pugsley; Narcissus candidissimus Desf. ex Redouté; Narcissus cernuus Roth; Narcissus tortuosus Haw.; Narcissus tortuosus var. penamayorensis Nava & Fern.Casado; Oileus albus (Haw.) Haw.

= Narcissus moschatus =

Species of flowering plant

Narcissus moschatus, the swan's neck daffodil, is a species of Narcissus native to the Pyrenees. It has gained the Royal Horticultural Society's Award of Garden Merit.

Some authorities regard Narcissus moschatus as a synonym for Narcissus pseudonarcissus subsp. moschatus (L.) Baker.
