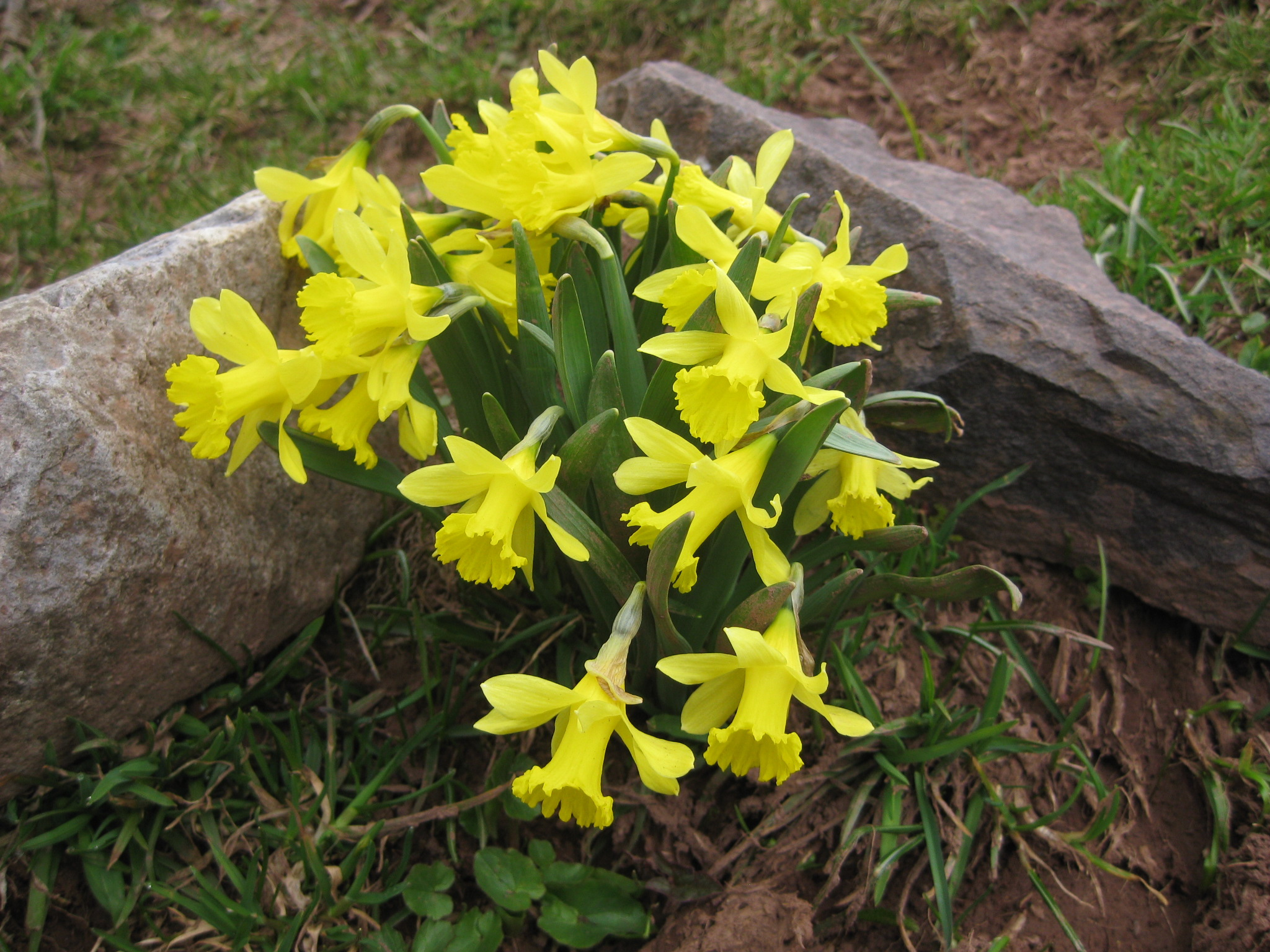

Scientific classification
- Kingdom: Plantae
- Clade: Tracheophytes
- Clade: Angiosperms
- Clade: Monocots
- Order: Asparagales
- Family: Amaryllidaceae
- Subfamily: Amaryllidoideae
- Genus: Narcissus
- Species: N. jacetanus

Binomial name
- Narcissus jacetanus Fern. Casas

Synonyms
- Narcissus vasconicus (Fern. Casas) Fern. Casas

= Narcissus jacetanus =

Species of daffodil

Narcissus jacetanus is a species of the genus Narcissus (daffodils) in the family Amaryllidaceae. It is classified in Section Pseudonarcissus. It is native to northern Spain around Pamplona. It is found on calcareous soil.

== Taxonomy ==
Amongst the Pseudonarcissus, it is classed as Group A, small flowered, in the Pacific Bulb Society modification of Mathew's taxonomy.

== Bibliography ==
- "Narcissus jacetanus". Tropicos.org. Missouri Botanical Garden.
- Narcissus jacetanus The Plant List
- Narcissus jacetanus World Checklist
- Narcissus jacetanus Alpine Garden Society
