= Narcissus nivalis =

Scientific classification
- Kingdom: Plantae
- Clade: Tracheophytes
- Clade: Angiosperms
- Clade: Monocots
- Order: Asparagales
- Family: Amaryllidaceae
- Subfamily: Amaryllidoideae
- Genus: Narcissus
- Species: N. nivalis

Binomial name
- Narcissus nivalis Graells

Synonyms
- Narcissus bulbocodium subsp. nivalis (Graells) K.Richt.

Species of daffodil

Narcissus nivalis is a species of the genus Narcissus (daffodils) in the family Amaryllidaceae. It is classified in Section Bulbocodium. It is native to Morocco in North Africa.

== Taxonomy ==
Narcissus nivalis was described by the Spanish physician, naturalist and politician Mariano de la Paz Graells and published in Memorias, Real Academia de Ciencias Exactas, Físicas y Naturales de Madrid 2: 473, in 1859. The species name nivalis, means snow.
