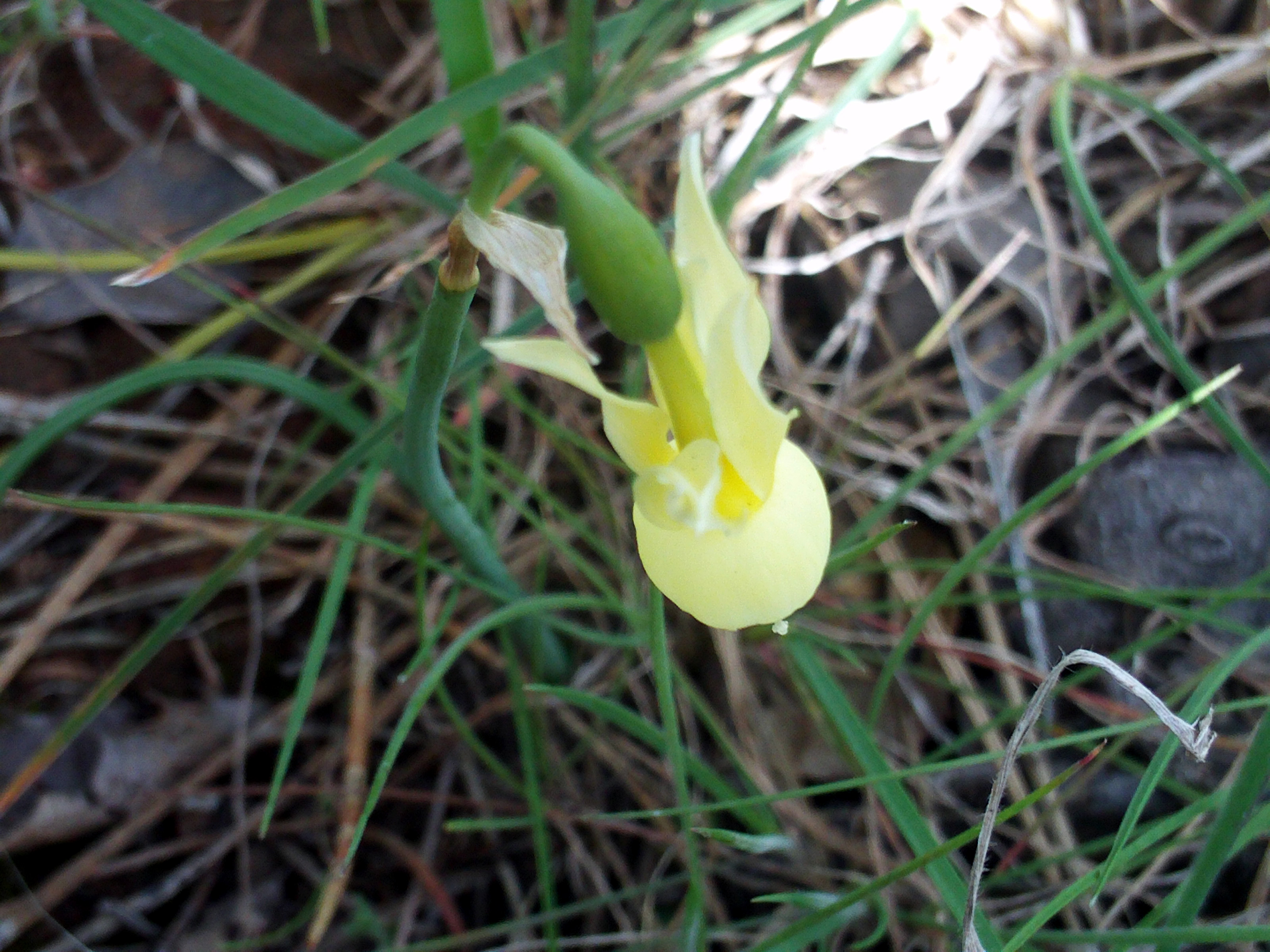
- Narcissus pallidulus

Scientific classification
- Kingdom: Plantae
- Clade: Tracheophytes
- Clade: Angiosperms
- Clade: Monocots
- Order: Asparagales
- Family: Amaryllidaceae
- Subfamily: Amaryllidoideae
- Genus: Narcissus
- Species: N. pallidulus

Binomial name
- Narcissus pallidulus Graells

Synonyms
- Narcissus cernuus Salisb.; Narcissus triandrus subsp. pallidulus (Graells) Rivas Goday

= Narcissus pallidulus =

Species of daffodil

Narcissus pallidulus is a species of the genus Narcissus (Daffodils) in the family Amaryllidaceae. It is classified in Section Ganymedes. It is native to Spain.

== Taxonomy ==
Opinions vary as the status of this taxon. Zonnefeld (2208) discusses its status, believing both on genetic information and morphology and distribution that it is a separate species from Narcissus triandrus. For instance the leaf width at 2mm is much smaller. While Webb (1980) and Barra Lazaro (2000) consider it a variety or subspecies of the type species of the section (N. triandrus). he is supported in this by both Dorda and Fernandez Casas (1989) and Perez-Barrales et al. (2006).

However officially according to the World Checklist and The Plant List it is considered Narcissus cernuus.
