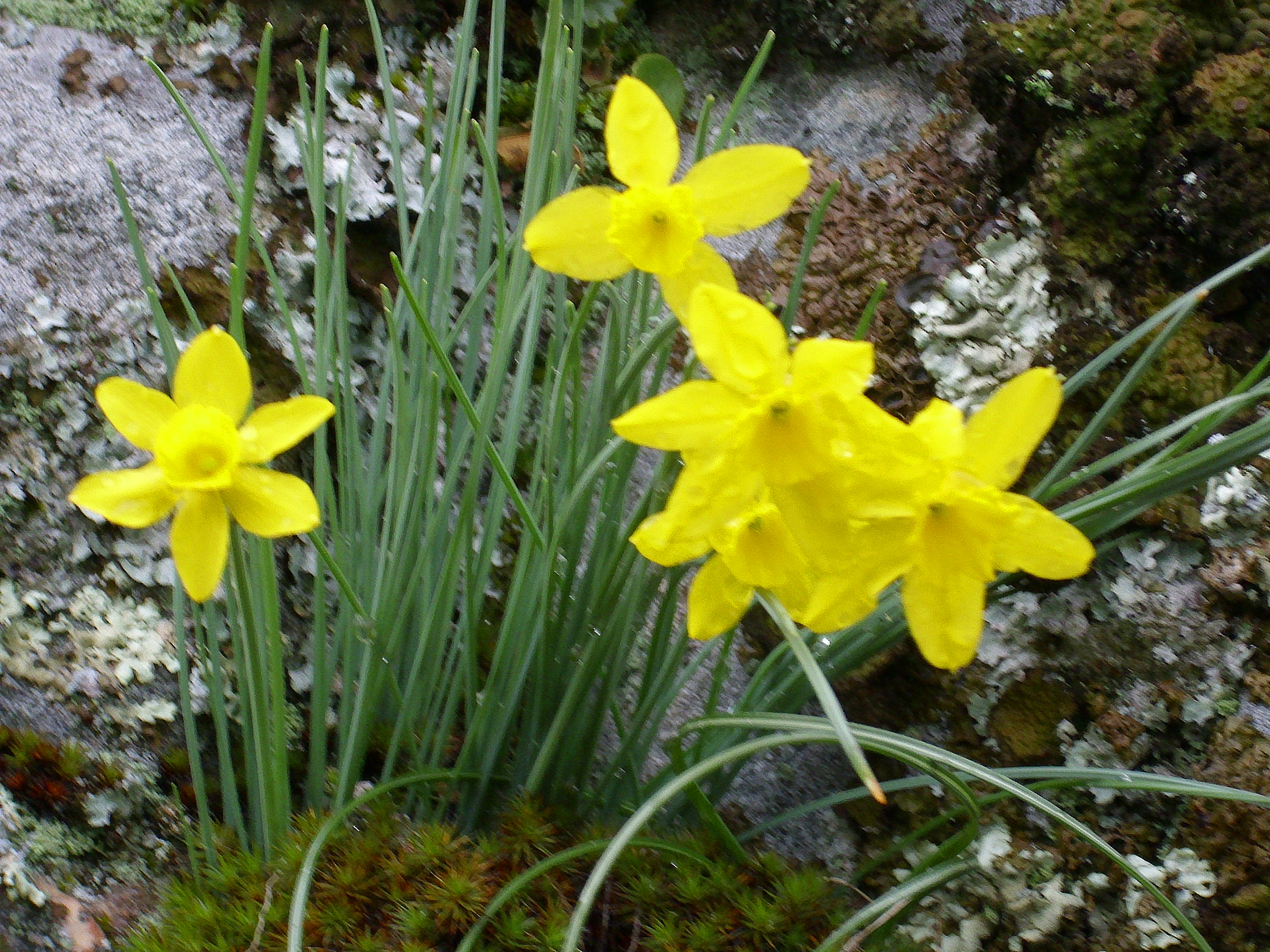

Scientific classification
- Kingdom: Plantae
- Clade: Tracheophytes
- Clade: Angiosperms
- Clade: Monocots
- Order: Asparagales
- Family: Amaryllidaceae
- Subfamily: Amaryllidoideae
- Genus: Narcissus
- Species: N. rupicola

Binomial name
- Narcissus rupicola Dufour
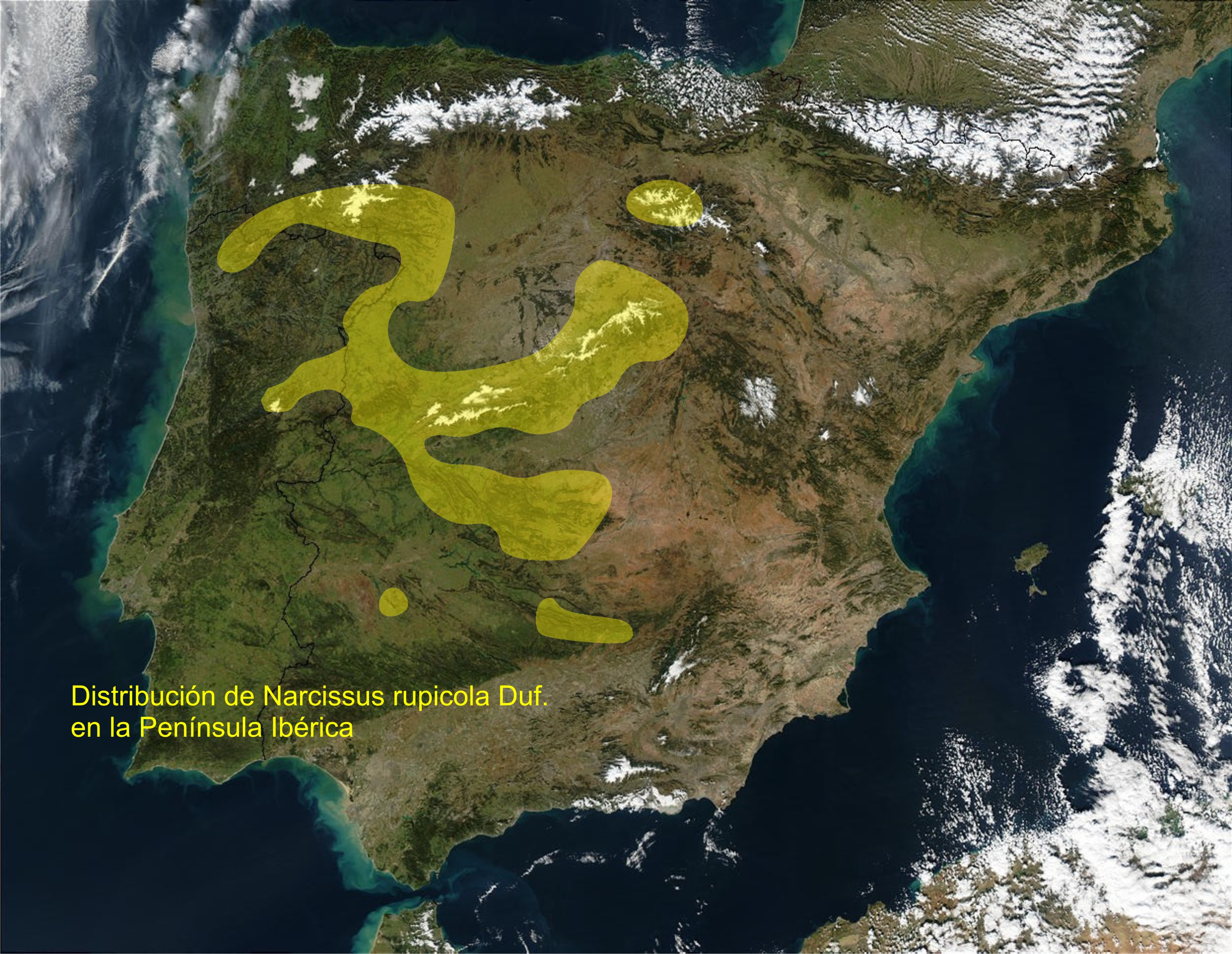
- Distribution range

Synonyms
- Narcissus juncifolius subsp. rupicola (Dufour) Baker

= Narcissus rupicola =

Species of daffodil

Narcissus rupicola is a species of the genus Narcissus (daffodils) in the family Amaryllidaceae. It is classified in Section Jonquillae.

== Distribution and habitat ==
Narcissus rupicola is native to the central Iberian Peninsula. It grows in rocky places, including ledges and rock crevices where there is very little soil substrate.
