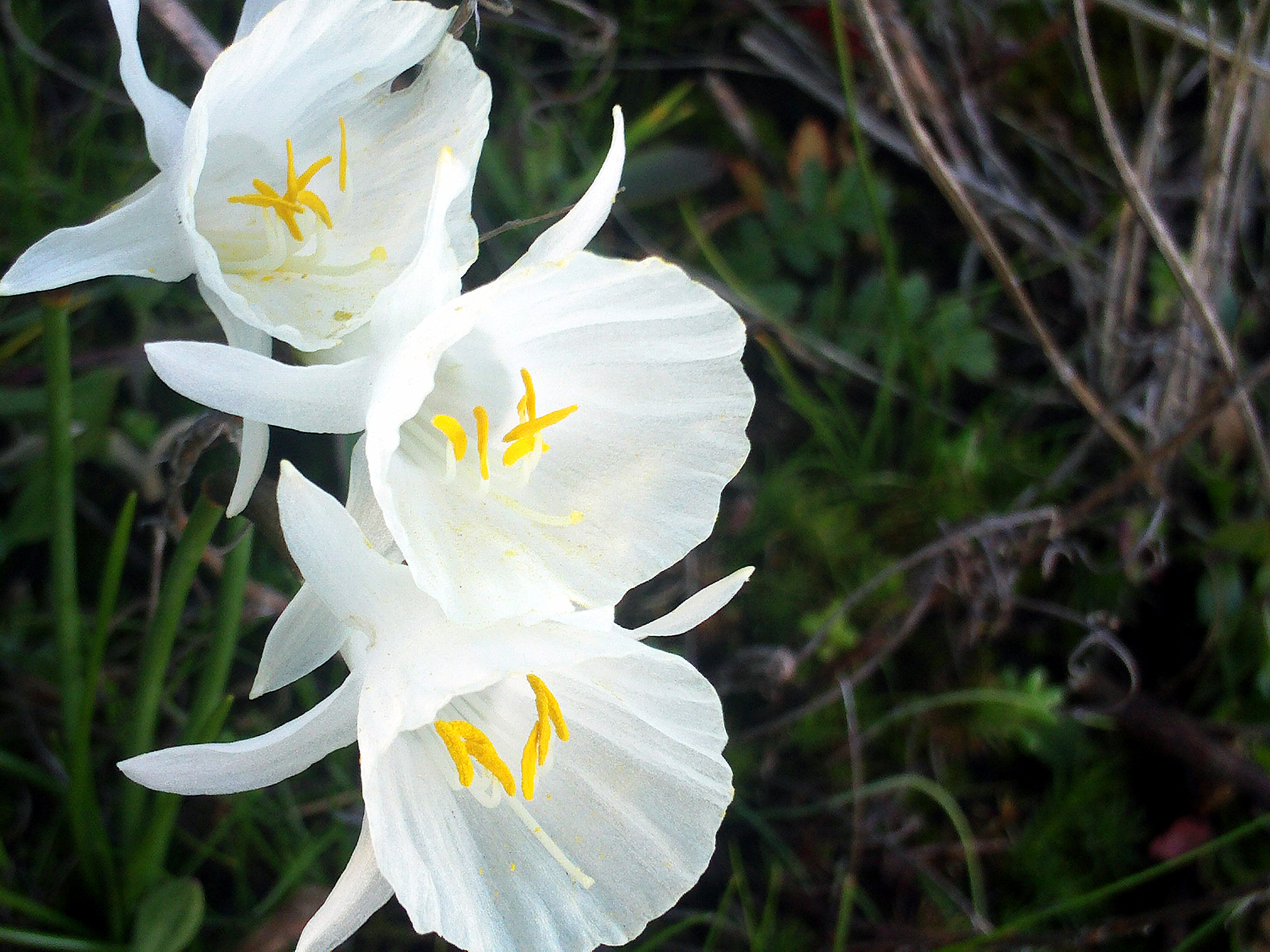

Scientific classification
- Kingdom: Plantae
- Clade: Tracheophytes
- Clade: Angiosperms
- Clade: Monocots
- Order: Asparagales
- Family: Amaryllidaceae
- Subfamily: Amaryllidoideae
- Genus: Narcissus
- Species: N. cantabricus

Binomial name
- Narcissus cantabricus DC
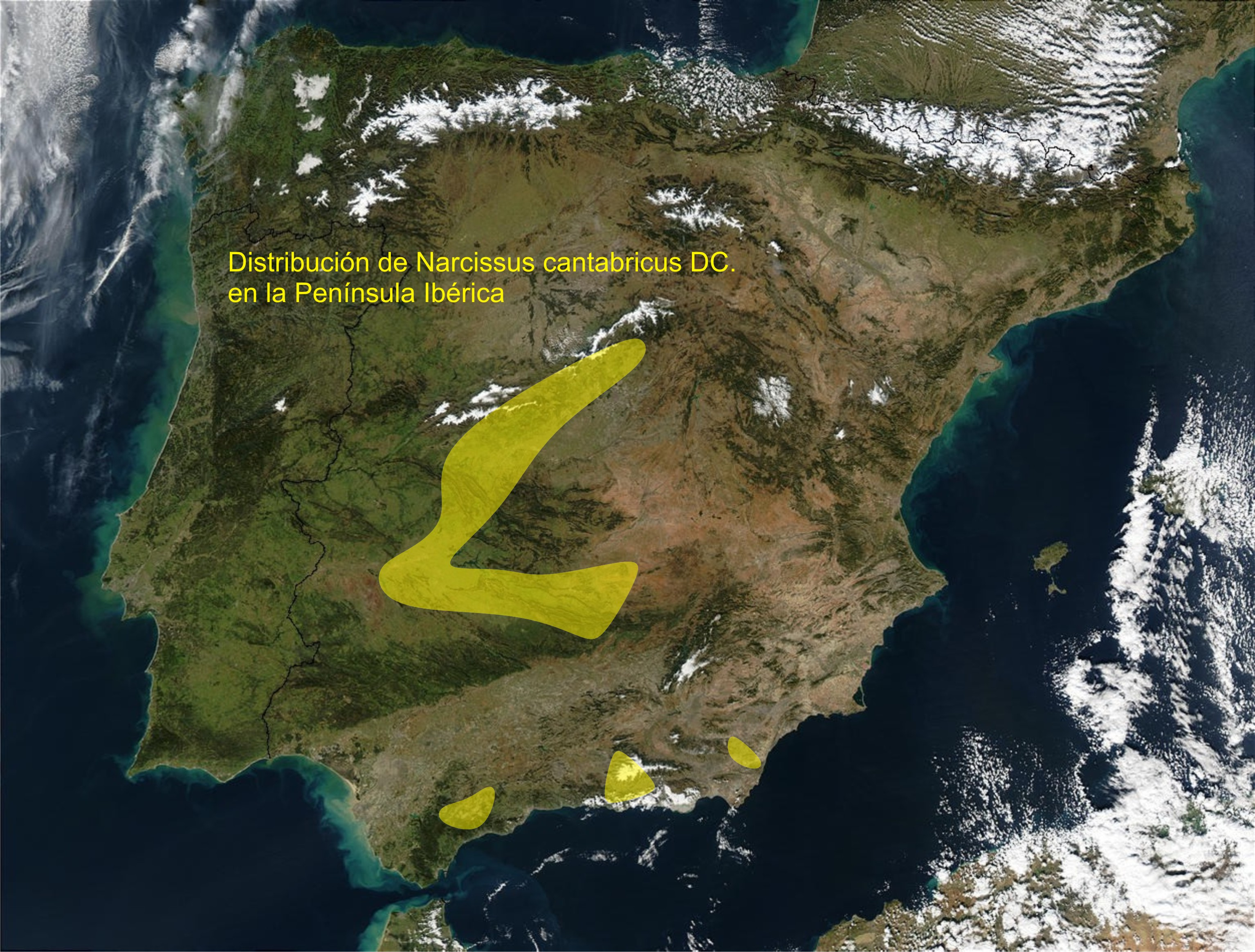
- Distribution range

Synonyms
- Narcissus bulbocodium var. foliosus Maire

= Narcissus cantabricus =

Species of daffodil

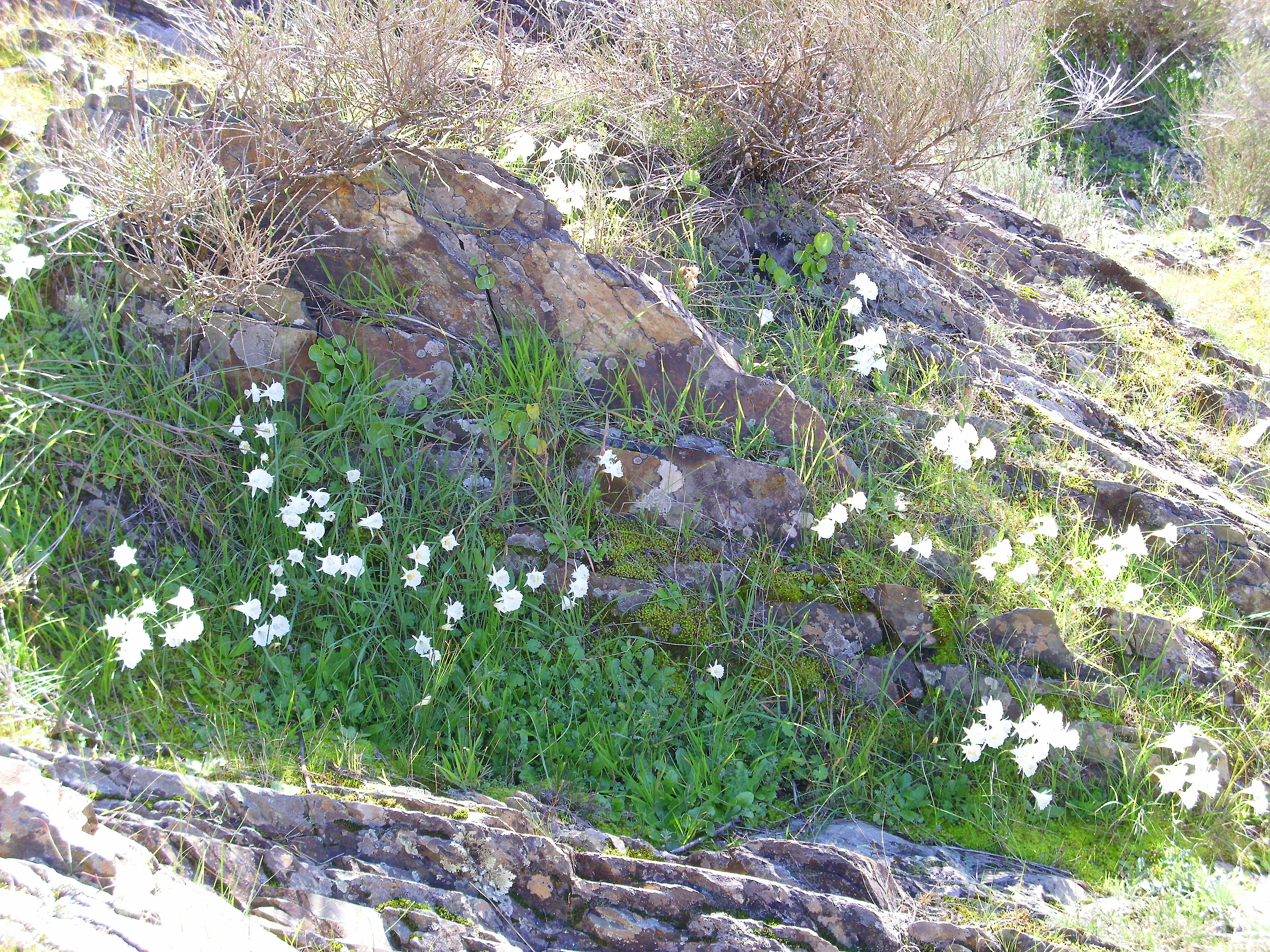
N. cantabricus growing in the Sierra Madrona. Spain

Narcissus cantabricus is a species of the genus Narcissus (Daffodils) in the family Amaryllidaceae. It is classified in Section Bulbocodium.

== Distribution and habitat ==
Narcissus cantabricus is native to the central and southern Iberian Peninsula and northwest Africa (Morocco and Algeria)

== Bibliography ==
- Abílio Fernandes. The Rehabilitation of Narcissus Cantabricus DC. Kew Bulletin Vol. 12, No. 3 (1957), pp. 373-385
