= Narcissus 'Jetfire' =

Daffodil cultivar

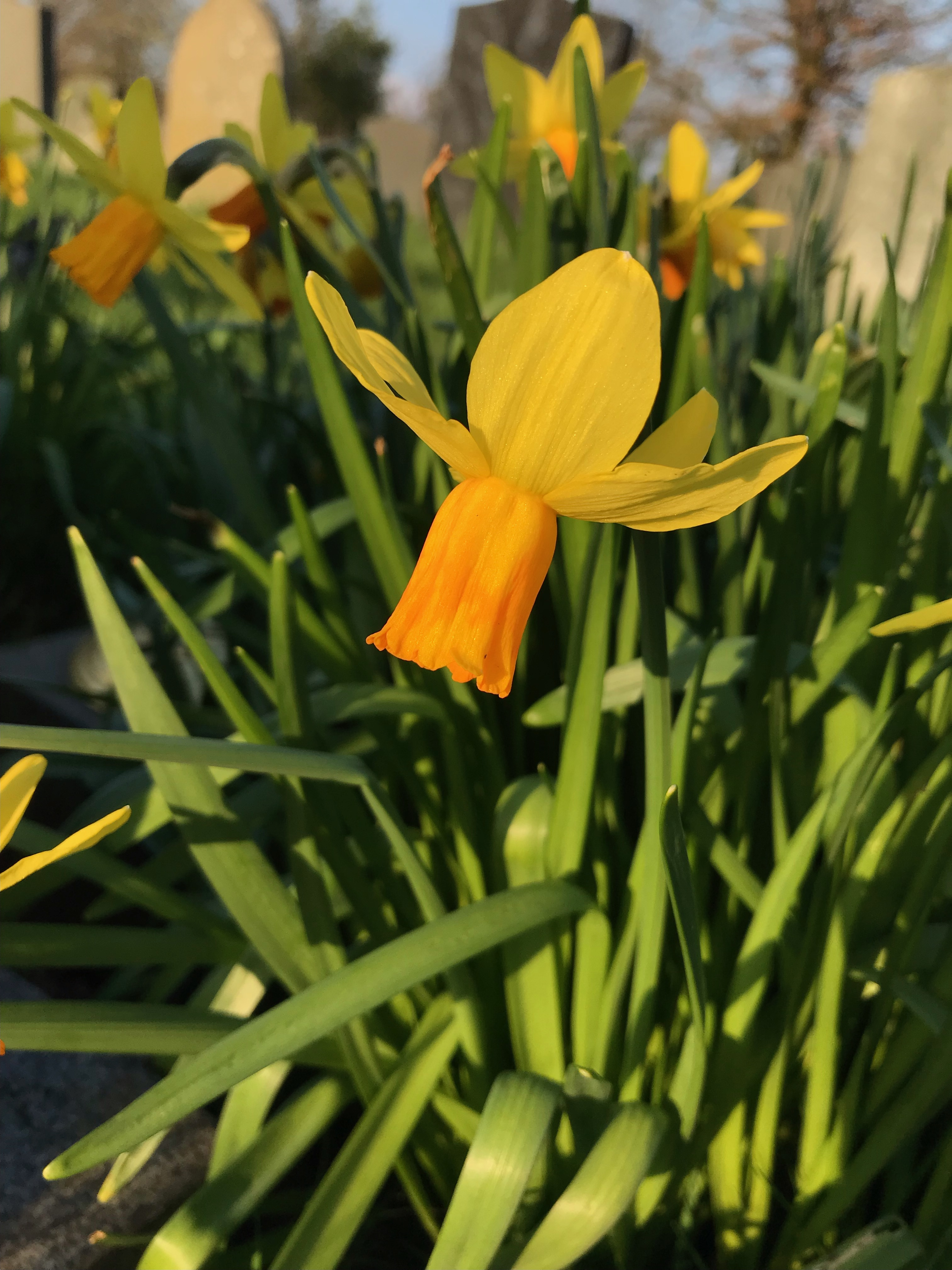
- Genus: Narcissus
- Hybrid parentage: Narcissus cyclamineus × Unnamed Seedling
- Cultivar: 'Jetfire'
- Breeder: Grant E. Mitsch (1907-1989)
- Origin: Oregon, USA

Narcissus 'Jetfire' is a cultivar of dwarf Narcissus, which was introduced in 1966. It is one of many cultivars produced by American daffodil breeder Grant E. Mitsch. 'Jetfire' is a popular early flowering ornamental plant utilized in gardens, where it can be planted into borders, flowerpots, and naturalized in lawns. The cultivar has received multiple awards, including the Award of Garden Merit from the Royal Horticultural Society.

== Description ==
Narcissus 'Jetfire' is a bulbous perennial plant. The cultivar is an early flowering dwarf, reaching a maximum height of 20 cm tall. Plants possesses slender, vibrant green leaves. Bulbs may produce secondary stems, which can provide additional flower stalks. Flower stalks host a single flower per stalk. Flowers are slightly scented and 7 cm in width. The perianth segments are ovate in shape and are a vivid yellow colour. Petals are slightly reflexed, creating a creased appearance with wavy margins that overlap about one-third of their length. The inner segments have more pronounced creases. The corona is orange in colour, cylindrically trumpet shaped and loosely ribbed. The mouth of the corona is slightly expanded and has a regularly crenate rim. 'Jetfire' is an early flowering cultivar which blooms in the early spring, with flowers emerging between the months of March and April.

== History ==
One of the most celebrated American daffodil breeders was Grant Mitsch who began growing Narcissus in 1928. Mitsch had previously bred other species such as Gladiolus, however during a visit to a local horticulturists garden in 1931 he saw Narcissus such as 'King Alfred' and became smitten with the genus. Mitsch began purchasing and breeding Narcissus from the 1930s onward, where he made his livelihood growing and selling various plant species. However, by the mid-1950s onward he had focused almost exclusively on breeding, growing and selling Narcissus. During this period Mitsch would produce Narcissus 'Jetfire' by hybridizing various Narcissus species and cultivars together. Mitsch would eventually register Narcissus 'Jetfire' in 1966.

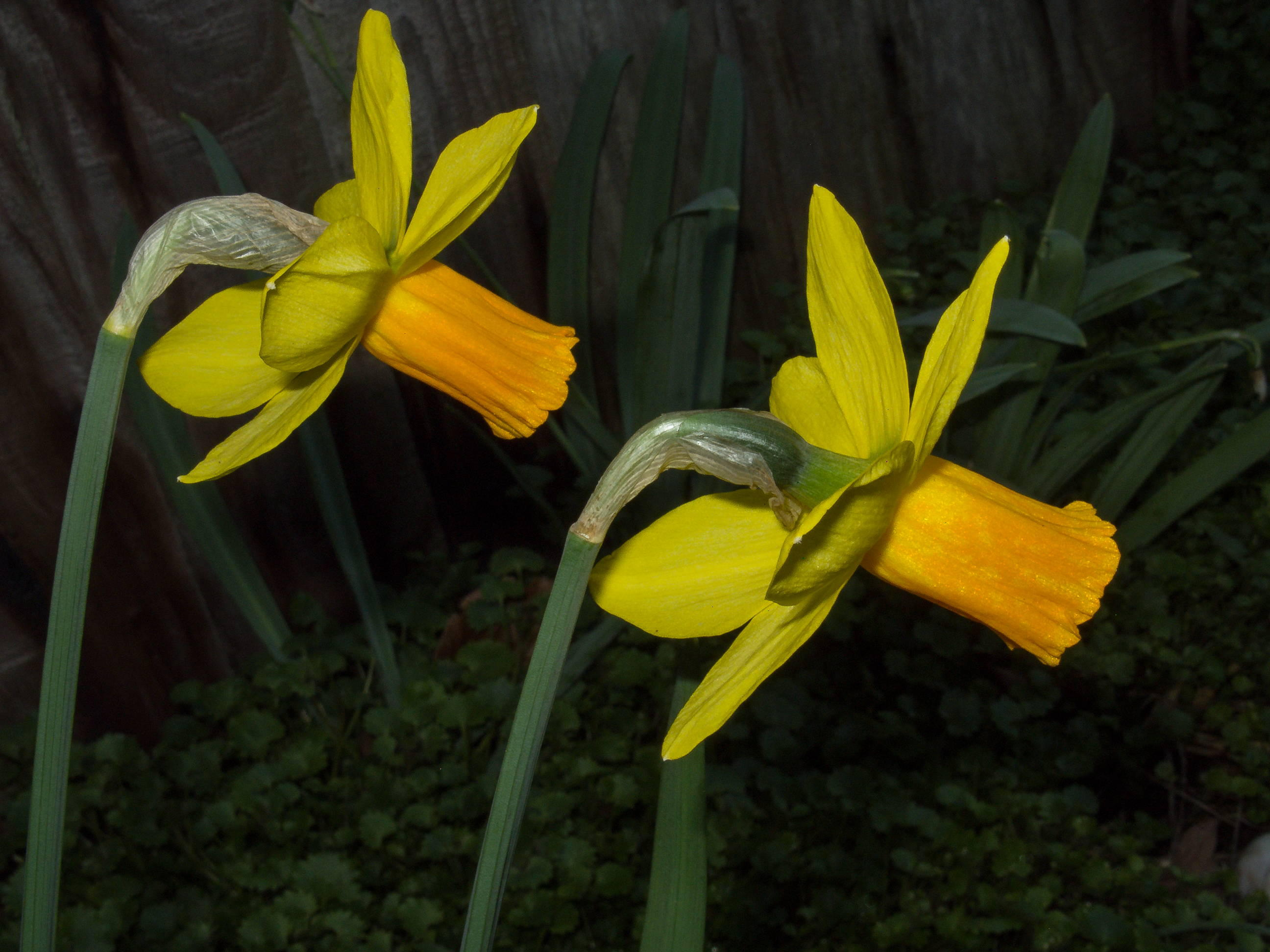

Narcissus 'Jetfire' would go onto receive multiple awards from the British Royal Horticultural Society. In 1987 (only 2 years before Grant Mitsch's death), the cultivar would receive the Award of Merit. In 1990 the cultivar would also be awarded the HC award for being highly commended. The final award received from the Royal Horticultural Society was the Award of Garden Merit in In 1995.

By the early 2000s Narcissus 'Jetfire' had become one of the world's most popular dwarf daffodil cultivars with great economic importance. During 2003 the Netherlands made $7.6 billion exporting plants to the rest of the world, with bulbs making up 10% of the exported goods. During a growing period between 2009 and 2010 within the Netherlands, 'Jetfire' was cultivated on 42 hectares of the 1578 hectares dedicated to growing Narcissus.

== Cultivation ==
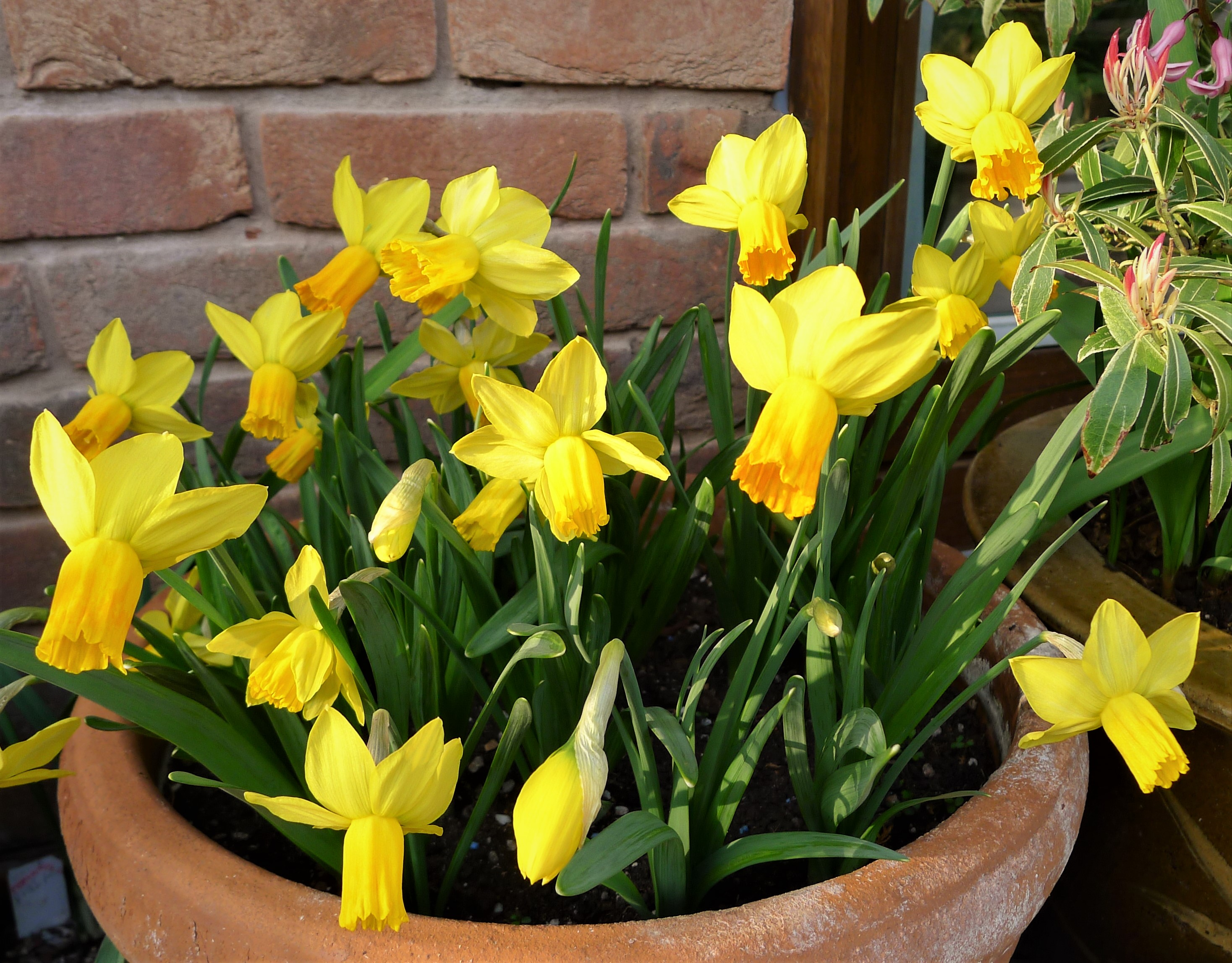
Narcissus 'Jetfire' cultivated inside a plant pot.

Narcissus 'Jetfire' is suitable for planting in garden borders, containers, or naturalizing in grass lawns as an ornamental plant. The cultivar grows best in full sun to partial shade. Good soil drainage is essential, however the soil should maintain moisture during the plant's active phase. Dry soil can be tolerated during seasonal dormancy. To achieve optimal flowering results, it is recommended to plant the bulbs at a depth two to three times their own size. Shallow planting may result in a lack of flowers, as the Narcissus instead focuses on bulb division. 'Jetfire' bulbs should be planted early in the bulb-planting season, ideally in late August to early September.

After the daffodil has completed its flowering cycle, it is important to refrain from cutting back the foliage until it has fully withered. The leaves play a crucial role in generating nutrients that are transported down into the bulb, supporting next year's growth and flower production. Clumps of Narcissus 'Jetfire' can be dug up and divided after the foliage dies back.

== Genetics ==
Narcissus 'Jetfire' possesses a complex family tree, involving hybridization between various cultivars and species. Over fifteen daffodil cultivars were utilized within the gene pool including 'Carbineer', 'Fortune' and 'King Alfred'. These cultivars descended from or were then bred with the Narcissus species: N. abscissus, N. bicolor, N. cyclamineus, N. hispanicus, N. poeticus and N. pseudonarcissus. The result is a complex family tree with both cultivars and species present within the ancestry of Narcissus 'Jetfire'.

The pollen parent of Narcissus 'Jetfire' is N. cyclamineus, while its seed parent is an unnamed seedling. The unnamed seedling was produced by crossing the cultivars 'Market Merry' to 'Carbineer' to make a resulting offspring which was then crossed with 'Armada'. The successive offspring of this cross was the unnamed seedling used as the seed parent.

Narcissus 'Jetfire' is both seed and pollen fertile, with a chromosome count of 2n=21.

== Pests and diseases ==
Narcissus 'Jetfire' may experience bulb rot in poorly drained soil. 'Jetfire' can also fall victim to the Narcissus yellow stripe virus, which is transmitted by aphids. Pest species such as Narcissus bulb flies, nematodes and bulb scale mites will also feed on daffodils. Slugs and snails may also cause damage to the plants foliage.
