= Peruvian daffodil =

Peruvian daffodil refers to several genera and species of plants:

- Ismene, a genus of perennial bulbs
- Paramongaia, a genus of perennial bulbs
- Pamianthe, a genus of perennial bulbs
- Hymenocallis, a genus of perennial bulbs
- Chlidanthus fragrans, a bulbous geophyte native to Peru and Argentina
