= List of Narcissus horticultural divisions =

Divisions of cultivars of daffodil plants

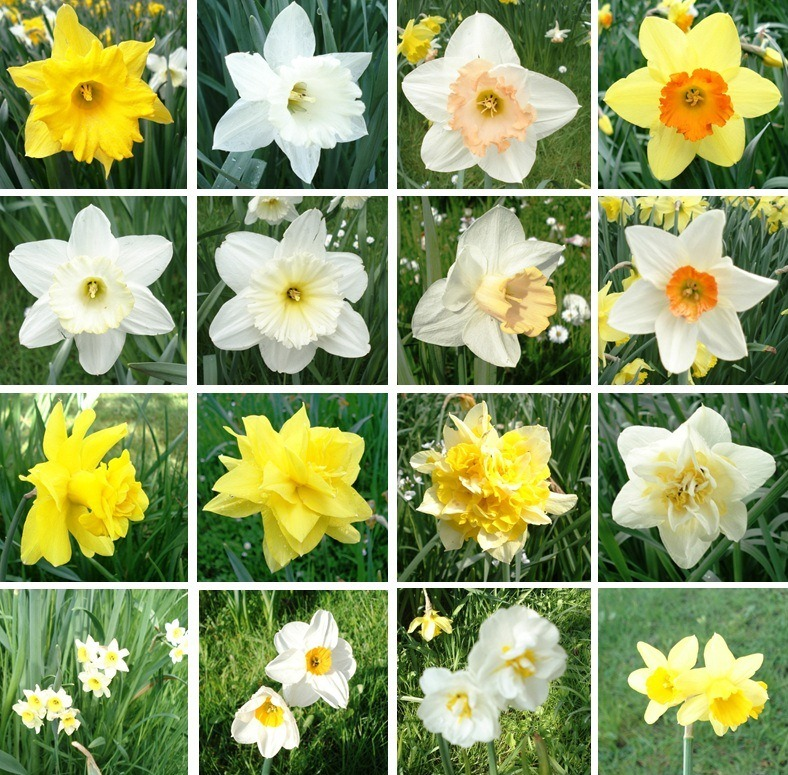
Range of Narcissus cultivars

The List of Narcissus horticultural divisions is a classification of the cultivated varieties of the genus Narcissus (/nɑːrˈsɪsəs/), which are predominantly spring perennial plants in the family Amaryllidaceae. Most species and cultivars are known by the common name daffodil, while a few are called jonquils.

The list of Narcissus horticultural divisions provided by the Royal Horticultural Society (RHS) is the standard method used to classify and describe cultivated varieties (cultivars) of Narcissus. It is widely used since the RHS is the international authority for the registration of such cultivars. For horticultural purposes, all Narcissus cultivars are split into 13 divisions, as described by Kington (1998), for the RHS, based partly upon flower form (shape and length of corona—the "trumpet" or "cup"), particularly the ratio of corona to length of perianth segments (tepals or "petals"), the number of flowers per stem, flowering period and partly upon the genetic background. Division 11 (Split-corona) with its two subdivisions was the most recent group to be described (1969). Division 13, which includes all the wild rather than cultivated daffodils, is the exception to this scheme. This classification is a useful tool for planning planting. Most commercially available narcissi come from Divisions 1 (Trumpet), 2 (Large-cupped) and 8 (Tazetta).

Growers register new daffodil cultivars by name and colour with the RHS, whose International Daffodil Register is regularly updated with supplements available online and is searchable. The most recent supplement (2014) is the sixth; the fifth was published in 2012. More than 27,000 names were registered as of 2008, and the number has continued to grow. However, because of synonymy, the actual number is probably closer to 18,000; only about 500 are in commercial production (470 in 2009–2010).

Registered daffodils are given a division number and colour code such as 5W-W ('Thalia'). In horticultural usage it is not uncommon to also find another unofficial division of 'Miniatures', which, although drawn from the other 13 divisions, have their miniature size in common. These are sometimes referred to by nurseries as 'Division 14'. Over 140 narcissus cultivars have gained the Royal Horticultural Society's Award of Garden Merit.

== Colour code ==
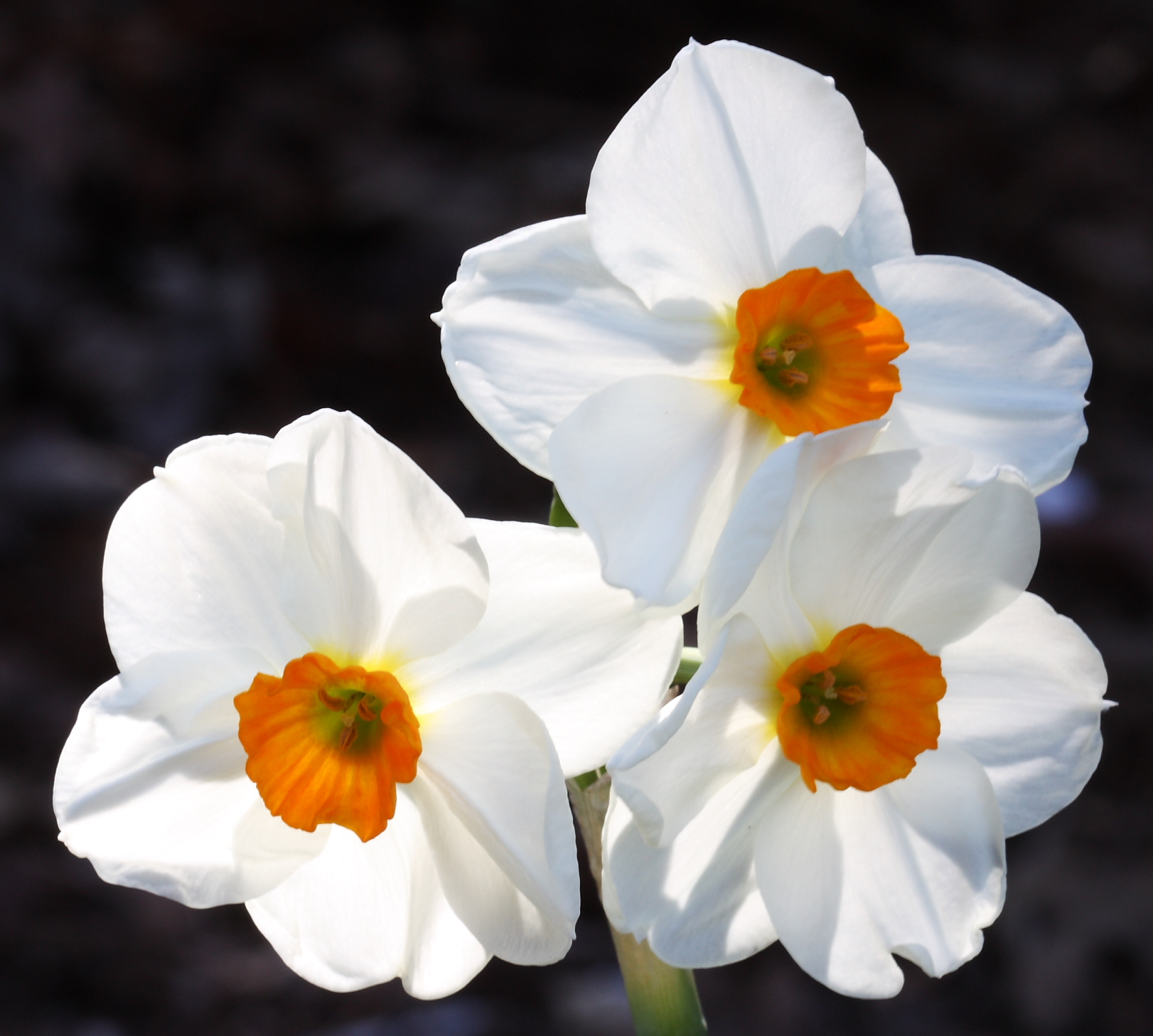
Narcissus 'Geranium' 8W-O

Daffodils may be self-coloured—i.e., both perianth and corona identical in colour and shade—or the colours between the perianth and corona may differ widely. Some perianths and some coronas may also contain more than one colour or shade. Prevalent colours are all shades and tones of yellow, white, orange, pink, red and green. Pinks vary from apricot to rose in shades from pale to deep, and some more recent cultivars have hints of lavender or lilac. Reds vary from orange-red to salmon red to near scarlet. Pink, red, orange and green tones are mainly confined to the corona. However, breeders are currently working against the genus' natural pigmentation and genetic barriers to create cultivars in which pink, rose, red, orange and green tones suffuse or "bleed" from the more highly coloured coronas onto the perianth segments of white or yellow. There is an increasing number of commercially available varieties which display this enhanced colouration.

The colour classification lists the perianth colour and then the corona colour. In the case of multiple colours, the perianth colours are assigned from the outer edge of the perianth segments inward to their juncture with the base of the corona, while the corona colours are assigned from the base of the corona outward to the rim. Thus, 'Accent', a Large Cup (Division 2) Daffodil possessing a white perianth and a pink corona, is officially classified as 2W-P, 'Geranium', Tazetta (Division 8) with a white perianth and orange corona is 8W-O and 'Actaea', Poeticus (Division 9), with white perianth and multicoloured corona is 9W-GYR.

RHS colour classification
Code	Colour
W	White or Whitish
G	Green
Y	Yellow
P	Pink
O	Orange
R	Red

== Definitions of divisions ==
RHS horticultural divisions of daffodils
Number	Name	Definition	Cultivar Example Code Year (Note: Year of registration or first flowering)
1	Trumpet Daffodil cultivars	Solitary flower with corona as long as, or longer than the tepals	'Little Gem'; 1Y–Y; 1959
2	Large-cupped Daffodil cultivars	Solitary flower with corona more than one-third, but less than equal to the length of the tepals	'Fortune'; 2Y–O; 1923
3	Small-cupped Daffodil cultivars	Solitary flower with corona not more than one-third the length of the tepals	'Barrett Browning'; 3WWY–O; 1945
4	Double Daffodil cultivars	One or more flowers with doubling of the corona or tepals or both	'Butter and Eggs'; 4Y–O; 1777
5	Triandrus Daffodil cultivars	Two or more flowers with characteristics of N. triandrus, flowers pendent and tepals reflexed	'Thalia'; 5W–W; 1916
6	Cyclamineus Daffodil cultivars	Solitary flower with characteristics of N. cyclamineus, flowers acutely angled to stem, very short pedicel, tepals reflexed	'February Gold'; 6Y–Y; 1923
7	Jonquilla and Apodanthus Daffodil cultivars	One to five, but rarely up to eight flowers with characteristics of sections Jonquilla or Apodanthi, flowers acutely angled to stem, corona cup or funnel shaped or flared, and usually wider than long, tepals spreading or reflexed, usually fragrant	'Stratosphere'; 7Y–O; 1968
8	Tazetta Daffodil cultivars	Three to twenty flowers, with characteristics of section Tazetta, flowers with tepals spreading, usually fragrant, stem stout	'Scilly Valentine'; 8Y–O; 2000
9	Poeticus Daffodil cultivars	Usually solitary flower, with characteristics of N. poeticus, flowers with corona very short to disc shaped, usually green and or yellow centre and red rim (sometimes a single colour), tepals white, usually fragrant	'Actaea'; 9W–YYR; 1927
10	Bulbocodium Daffodil cultivars	Usually solitary flower, with characteristics of section Bulbocodium, flowers with tepals insignificant relative to corona, anthers dorsiflexed, filament and style usually curved	'Golden Bells'; 10Y–Y; 1984
11	Split-corona Daffodil cultivars	Corona split, usually for more than half its length	
11	(a) Collar Daffodils	Corona two whorls of three, opposite tepals	'Mondragon'; 11aY–O; 1973
11	(b) Papillon Daffodils	Corona usually single whorl of six, alternate to tepals	[Jodi] 'Jodi'; 11bW–P/W; 2002
12	Other Daffodil cultivars	Cultivars not fitting any of the above definitions	'Tête-à-Tête'; 12Y–Y; 1949
13	Daffodils distinguished solely by botanical name	Wild (species) daffodils and hybrids without cultivar names	Narcissus × medioluteus 1768

== See also ==
- List of Narcissus species
- List of Award of Garden Merit narcissus

== Bibliography ==
- "The American Daffodil Society: The United States Center for Daffodil Information". The American Daffodil Society. 2015. Archived from the original on 11 February 2015.
- Hanks, Gordon R (2002). Narcissus and Daffodil: The Genus Narcissus. London: Taylor and Francis. ISBN 978-0-415-27344-2.
- Rina Kamenetsky, Hiroshi Okubo, ed. (2012). Ornamental Geophytes: From Basic Science to Sustainable Production. CRC Press. ISBN 978-1-4398-4924-8.
