= Jetfire (disambiguation) =

Jetfire is the name of several fictional characters from the Transformers franchise.

Jetfire or jet fire may also refer to:

- Jet fire, a momentum-driven flame.
- Beretta 950 Jetfire, a semi-automatic pistol designed and manufactured by Beretta.
- Oldsmobile Jetfire, a 1962 Oldsmobile and one of the first ever turbocharged production cars.
- Narcissus 'Jetfire', a popular dwarf daffodil cultivar.
