= Narcissus 'Tête-à-tête' =

Narcissus Cultivar 'Tête-à-tête' Daffodil

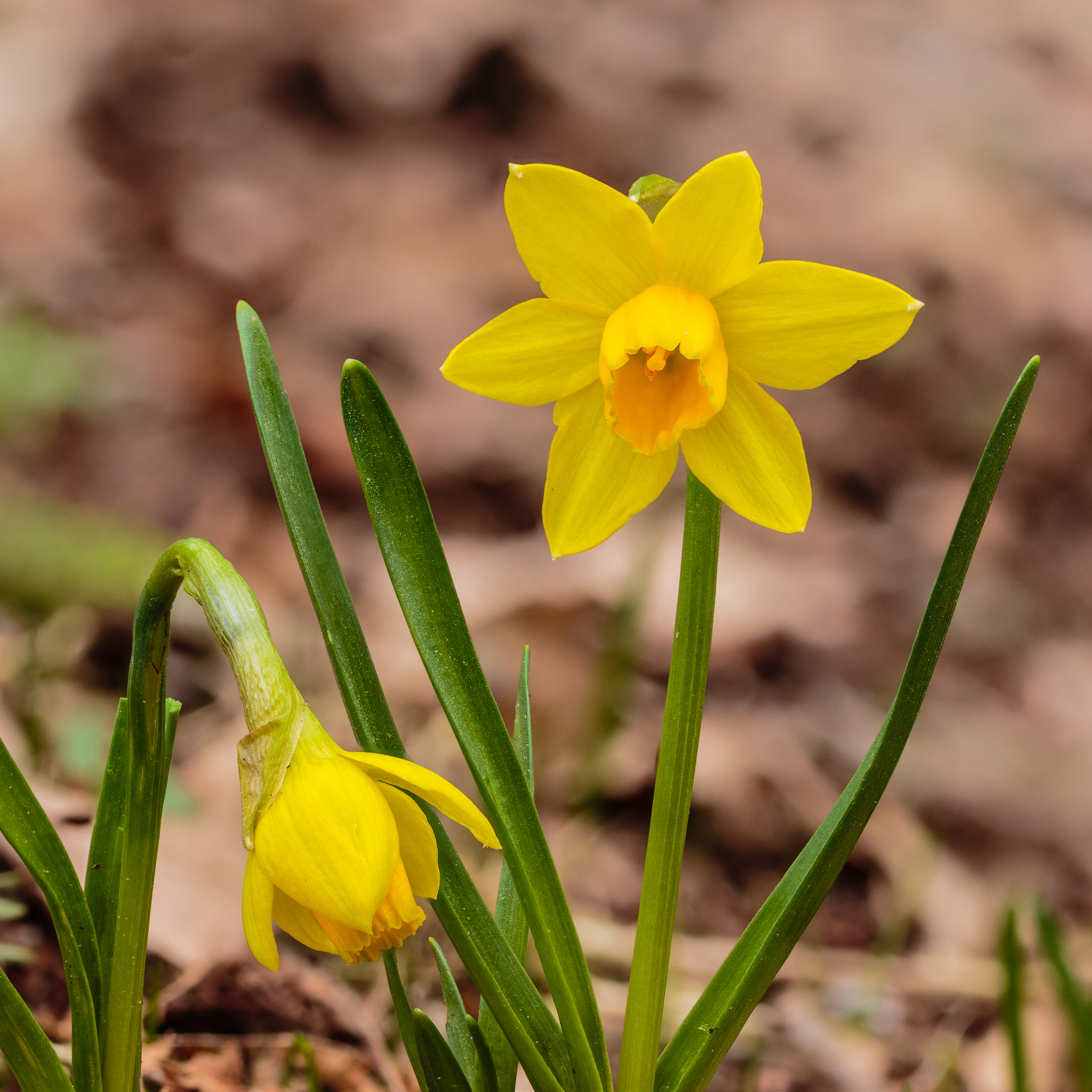
- Genus: Narcissus
- Hybrid parentage: Narcissus cyclamineus × Narcissus 'Cyclataz'
- Cultivar: 'Tête-à-tête'
- Breeder: Alec Gray (1895-1986)
- Origin: Cornwall, United Kingdom

Narcissus 'Tête-à-tête' is a hybrid cultivar of Narcissus, which was introduced in 1949. It is one of 110 cultivars produced by British daffodil breeder Alec Gray. 'Tête-à-tête' is a popular ornamental plant, which is known for its very early flowering period and short stature. This cultivar is commonly used as a garden plant where it can be planted in pots, rock gardens, garden borders and even naturalized in lawns. The cultivar name 'Tête-à-tête' means to have a conversation between two people, which relates to the cultivar often hosting a pair of flowers per stem.

== Description ==
Narcissus 'Tête-à-tête' is known as a dwarf daffodil. Plants emerge in early spring and produce deep yellow blooms. Flowers are 5–6 cm wide. Stems grow up to 15 cm tall with each stem usually possessing from 1 to 3 flowers. Blooms consist of a golden perianth with a deeper yellow cup. The perianth segments are ovate in shape and display a bright yellow hue, accentuated by a subtle white mucro. The segments can be either partly spread or slightly reflexed, with a flat, overlapping arrangement that covers approximately one-fourth of the flower. The inner segments exhibit wavy margins. The cup, located at the centre of the flower, is cylindrical and short, with a broad angle. Near the mouth of the cup, it slightly constricts and takes on a slightly darker tone compared to the perianth. The mouth of the cup is straight or slightly expanded and features six distinct lobes, with a crenate rim. 'Tête-à-tête' is sterile, therefore cannot reproduce naturally via seed and must instead reproduce asexually via bulb offsets.

== History ==
Renowned horticulturalist and daffodil breeder Alec Gray unintentionally produced many dwarf daffodils in his attempts to breed early flowering daffodil varieties for the cut flower trade. Gray had collected many species of daffodils from trips to Southern Europe, which he used as breeding stock. Among the cultivars produced was Narcissus 'Tête-à-tête'. The hybrid was first produced in the 1940s and Alec was originally unimpressed with the plant. Alec would later have a change of heart and release it under the name 'Tête-à-tête' in 1949. He went on to breed many more dwarf daffodil varieties that are also popular today such as: 'Minnow', 'Sun Disc' and 'Elka'. Gray carried on breeding new miniature daffodil varieties until he died in 1986.

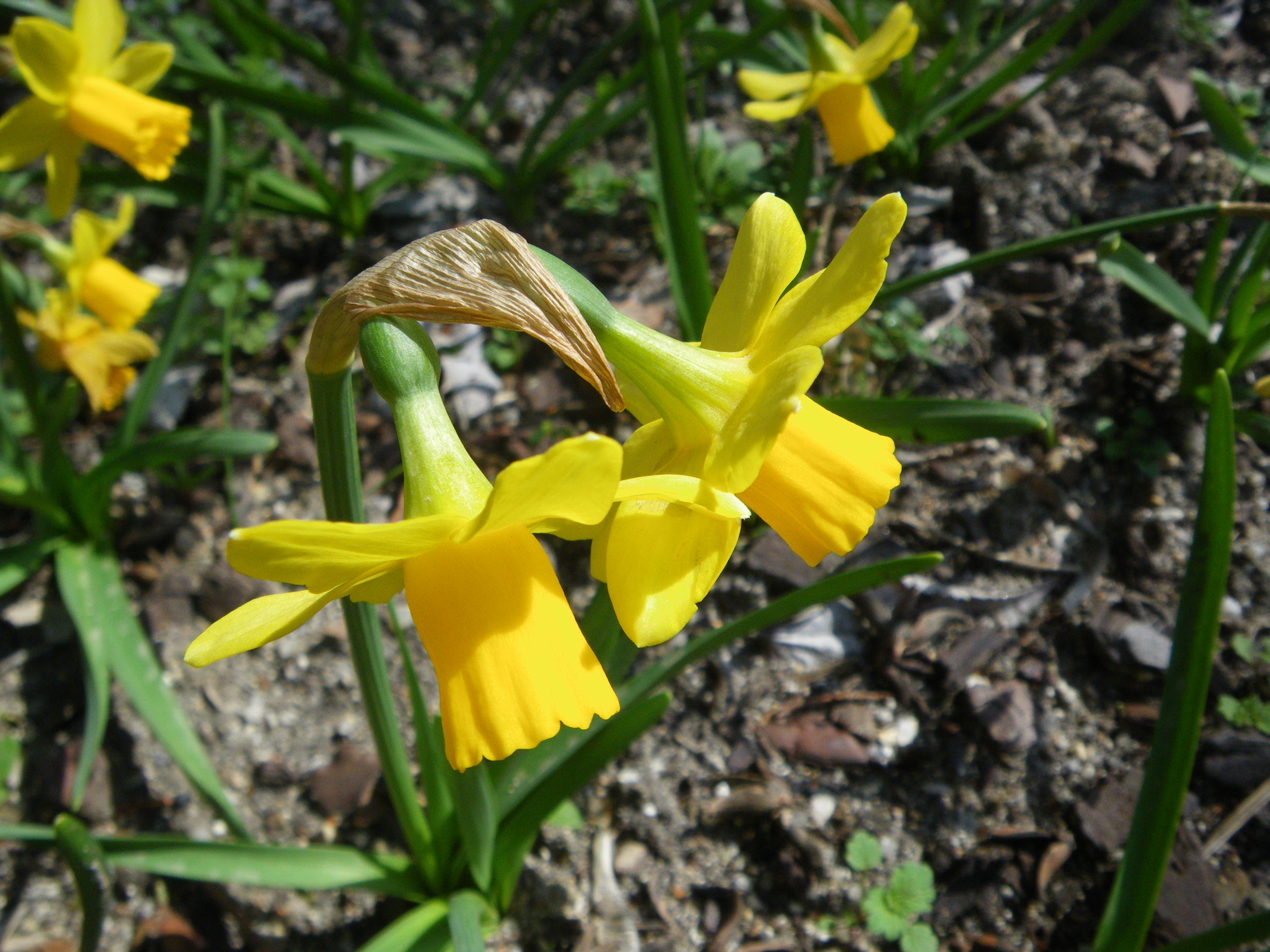
Narcissus Tête-à-tête with two flowers on the same stem.

'Tête-à-tête' would go on to take the gardening world by storm and has now become one of the most popular dwarf cultivars of daffodil. The cultivar has been farmed and sold at an industrial scale. By 2006 it made up 34% of the total Dutch daffodil bulb trade with 17 million pots sold at auction and distributed worldwide. In 2009, 38% of the total area used to grow narcissus in the Netherlands was dedicated to 'Tête-à-tête'.

The Royal Horticultural Society awarded this cultivar with a prestigious Award of Garden Merit in 2012.

In 2014 two new daffodil cultivars known as 'Tête Rosette' and 'Tête Boucle', said to be the offspring of 'Tête-à-tête' were exhibited at the Lentetuin show in Breezand, the Netherlands. Both new cultivars are now commercially available.

== Genetics ==
'Tête-à-tête' has a complicated parentage involving both hybrid cultivars and naturally occurring Narcissus species. One of the parent plants used to produce 'Tête-à-tête' is Narcissus cyclamineus. The second parent plant used was Narcissus ‘Cyclataz’, which is an interspecific cross between N. cyclamineus and Narcissus 'Grand Soleil d'Or'.

'Tête-à-tête' is an allotriploid plant (2n = 3x = 24 ? 1B chromosome). Due to the fact 'Tête-à-tête' is allotriploid and possesses three sets of chromosomes derived from different species it is sterile and cannot naturally reproduce via seed. It is however possible for triploid plants to be bred by unnatural means using embryo rescue techniques.

== Pests and diseases ==
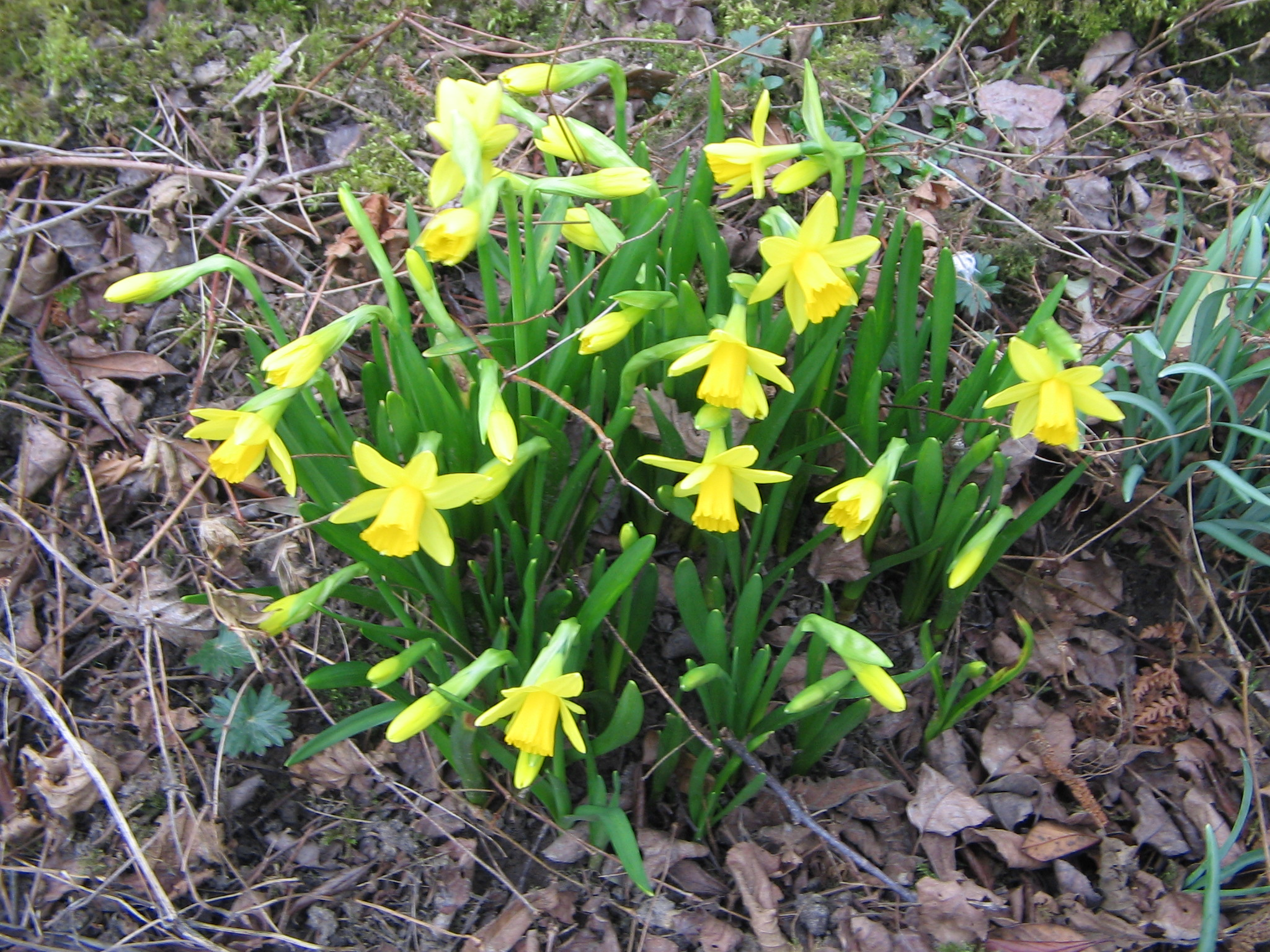
A clump of Narcissus 'Tête-à-tête'

'Tête-à-tête' can be vulnerable to multiple species of pest, including bulb scale mites (Steneotarsonemus laticeps), narcissus eelworm (Ditylenchus dipsaci) and various species of slug and snail. The large narcissus bulb fly (Merodon equestris) and two species of lesser narcissus bulb fly (Eumerus tuberculatus and Eumerus strigatus) will also feed on daffodils. Slugs and snails will eat the flowers, while bulb fly larvae, scale mites and eelworms will eat the bulbs.

Like most Narcissus, 'Tête-à-tête' is also susceptible to narcissus basal rot, which is caused by the fungus Fusarium oxysporum f.sp. narcissi. It is also susceptible to Botrytis cinerea, Botryotinia narcissicola and various species of Penicillium which cause light brown colouring of scale tissue and in severe cases death to the plant.
