= Alec Gray (horticulturalist) =

English nurseryman and horticulturalist (1895 – 1986)

Alec Gray (1895 – 1986) was an English nurseryman and horticulturalist. He was notable as an authority on and breeder of daffodils, having developed over 100 new cultivars over a career spanning 60 years. In his free time he was also an enthusiastic archaeologist and poet.

== Life and career ==
Gray was born in London in 1895. During WWI he served in the Royal Marines, which led him to be awarded the Belgian Croix de Guerre. After the war he qualified in fruit growing and worked in North Devon before managing the Gulval Ministry Experimental Station near Penzance. In the 1923 he moved on to work as a farm manager at the Duchy Farm on the Isles of Scilly, which is where his passion for daffodils and the Isles of Scilly was kindled. He established a small collection of daffodil varieties, and by the 1930s started to register new varieties himself. Gray would remain working at Duchy Farm up until 1963 and would continue to visit Scilly on annually after that.

During the 1940s, Gray founded the business Broadleigh Gardens at Bishops Hull. He would also go on to establish a nursery at Treswithian near Camborne where he ran a nursery business throughout the 1950s and 1960s. He kept Broadleigh Gardens for many years before selling it in 1972. Gray was also an amateur archaeologist and was one of the first people to excavate a stone age village at Bant's Carn. In 1972, his and others' archaeological findings would be published collectively in the book, Cornish Archaeology; volume 11. In 1979, he would also go on to publish a book of his own titled To Scilly, which was filled with poems he had written inspired by his time on the Isles of Scilly.

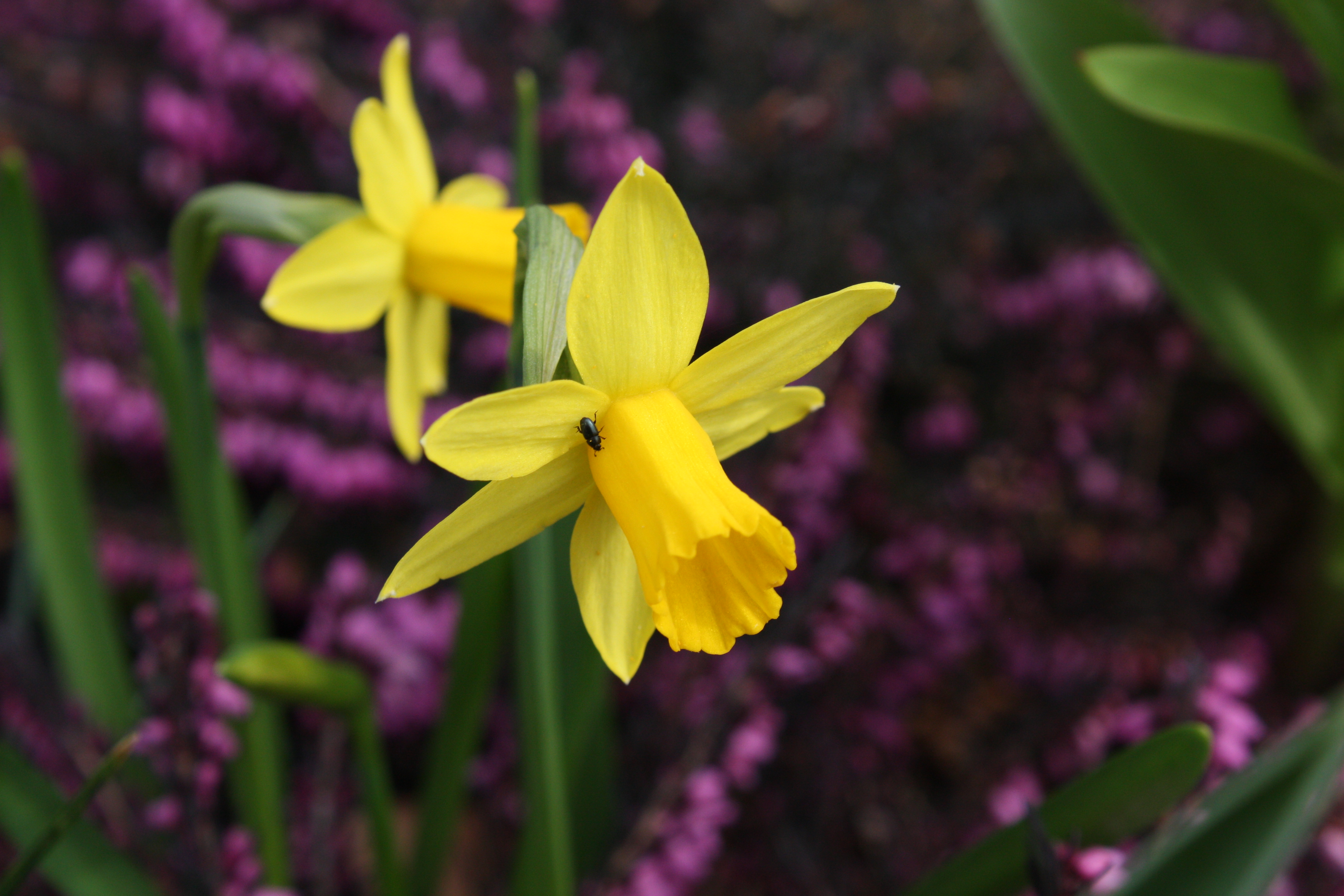
Narcissus "Tête-à-tête", one of the many cultivars introduced by Gray

Gray specialised in miniature daffodils, many bred from plants collected on trips to Southern Europe. Whilst some miniatures had been bred previously, Gray effectively created the modern form of miniature daffodil, originally as inadvertently during his attempts to breed early-flowering larger varieties. Amongst the cultivars he subsequently developed was Narcissus 'Tête-à-Tête', first grown in the 1940s, and which became the most widely grown miniature variety despite Gray initially being unimpressed with the plant. "Tête-à-Tête" remains an extremely commercially significant variety: by 2006 it made up some 34% of the total Dutch daffodil bulb trade, with 17 million pots sold at auction. A number of his other varieties won the Royal Horticultural Society Award of Garden Merit, including "Elka", "Jumblie", "Minnow" and "Sun Disc".

Gray retired in 1984, and died in 1986. After his death, Gray's daffodil collection was sold to Walter Stagg and then to Lady Skelmersdale of Broadleigh Gardens near Taunton. The various narcissus species, hybrids and cultivars are now part of a National Collection at Broadleigh Gardens where they are maintained, propagated and can be visited.

== Narcissus cultivars ==
Below is a comprehensive list of the 115 Narcissus cultivars bred by Alec Gray.

Alec Gray's Narcissus Cultivars
Cultivar Name	Date Introduced
Angie	1948
Anticipation	1975
April Tears	1939
Arctic Morn	1949
Bebop	1949
Bergh	1951
Bobbysoxer	1949
Bucca	1959
Camborne	1995
Candlepower	1975
Charles Warren	1948
Chinese Lantern	1955
Chough	1958
Clare	1968
Cobweb	1938
Cornet	1953
Demure	1953
Dilly	1958
Doncella	1967
Doublebois	1962
Dutch Quince	1986
Elfhorn	1948
Elfhorn#	1941
Elka	1989
Exit	1999
Flomay	1946
Flute	1957
Frosty Morn	1941
Gambas	1964
Gipsy Queen	1969
Gnome	1967
Goldsithney	1949
Green Ginger	1975
Halingy	1949
Helada	1961
Hifi	1959
Home Guard	1941
Hors d'Oeuvre	1959
Ivory Gate	1949
Jana	1949
Jetage	1957
Jethan	1967
Johanna	1950
Jumblie	1952
Keats	1968
Kehelland	1946
Kenellis	1948
Kidling	1951
Land Girl	1944
Leenan	1952
Little Dancer	1977
Little Dawn	1977
Little Sentry	1984
Lively Lady	1969
Lucy Gray	1974
March Breeze	1954
Marionette	1946
Mary Plumstead	1954
Marychild	1956
Millennium	1972
Miniskirt	1967
Minnow	1962
Mitzi	1955
Mitzy	1955
Mustardseed	1937
Nolyn	2007
Opening Bid	1975
Pango	1949
Paula Cottell	1961
Peaseblossom	1938
Pendrathen	1956
Perconger	1941
Phyllida Garth	1948
Picoblanco	1961
Pipers Barn	1947
Poppet	1958
Promise	1974
Quince	1953
Raindrop	1942
Rikki	1962
Roger	1952
Rosaline Murphy	1958
Rosedown	1949
Rupert	1961
Saint Helens	1941
Sea Gift	1923
Segovia	1962
Shady	1962
Shrew	1950
Shrimp	1955
Sidhe	1944
Skelmersdale Gold	1986
Skiffle	1957
Sneezy	1956
Snug	1957
Soltar	1961
Sprite	1972
Stafford	1956
Stella Turk	1958
Sugarbush	1954
Sun Disc	1946
Sundial	1955
Tanagra	1946
Tête-à-Tête	1949
Thoughtful	1951
Tiddler	1962
Tosca	1969
Tweeny	1950
Votive Candle	1967
West Wind	1958
Wolf	1935
Xit	1948
Yamolf	1950
Yellow Xit	1968
Yindee	1957
