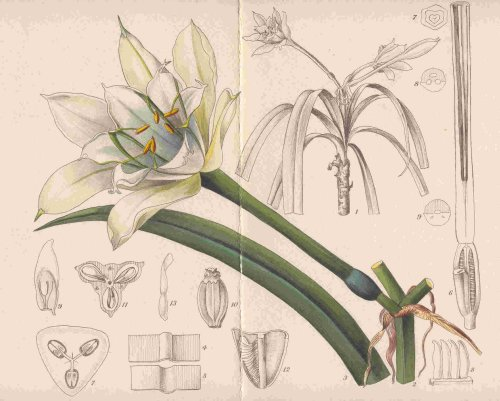
- Botanical illustration of Pamianthe peruviana

Scientific classification
- Kingdom: Plantae
- Clade: Embryophytes
- Clade: Tracheophytes
- Clade: Angiosperms
- Clade: Monocots
- Order: Asparagales
- Family: Amaryllidaceae
- Subfamily: Amaryllidoideae
- Genus: Pamianthe
- Species: P. peruviana

Binomial name
- Pamianthe peruviana Stapf
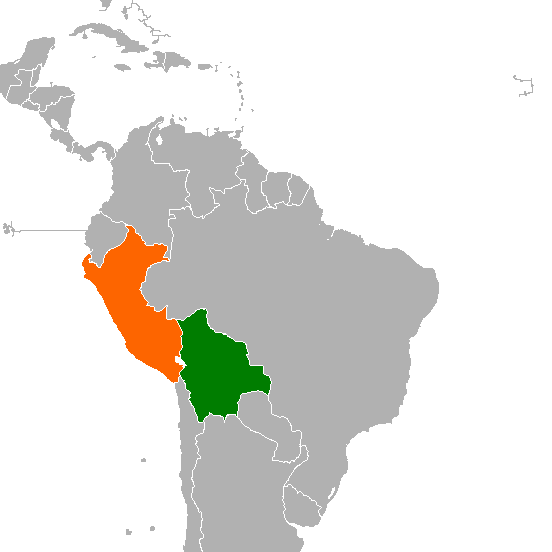
- Pamianthe peruviana is native to Peru and Bolivia

Synonyms
- Pamianthe cardenasii Traub

= Pamianthe peruviana =

Pamianthe peruviana Temporal range: 18.22 –0 Ma Early Miocene – Recent

Species of flowering plant

Pamianthe peruviana, also known as the giant Peruvian daffodil, is a species of epiphytic plant native to seasonally dry areas of Peru and Bolivia, but is believed to be extinct in the wild.

== Description ==
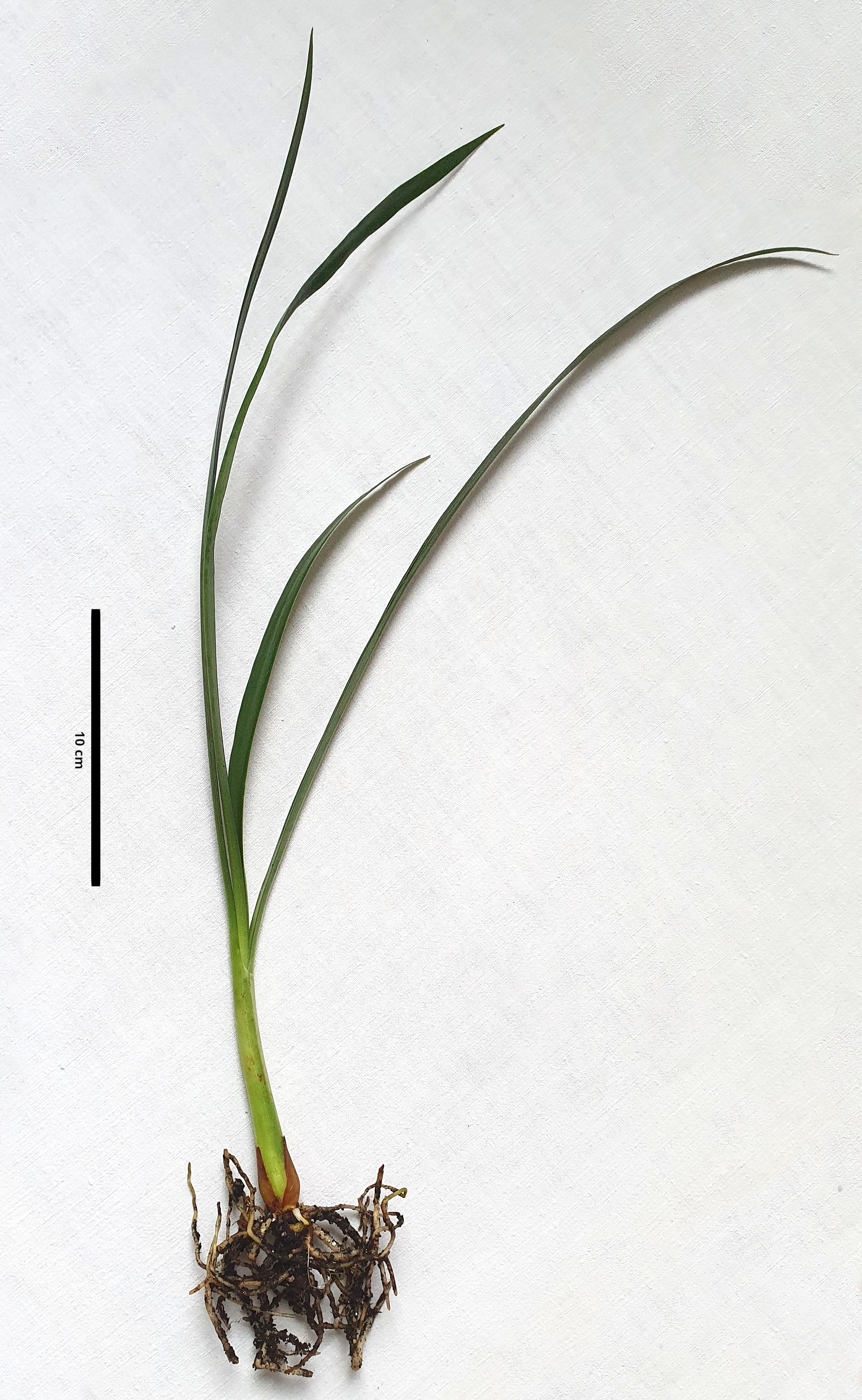
Immature Pamianthe peruviana Stapf bulb

=== Vegetative characteristics ===
Pamianthe peruviana is a perennial, bulbous plant with 5–7 linear leaves with a prominent mid vein, which form an up to 30 cm long pseudo-stem. Each leaf may reach lengths of up to 50 cm and widths of 2–4 cm. The bulbs are stoloniferous.

=== Generative characteristics ===
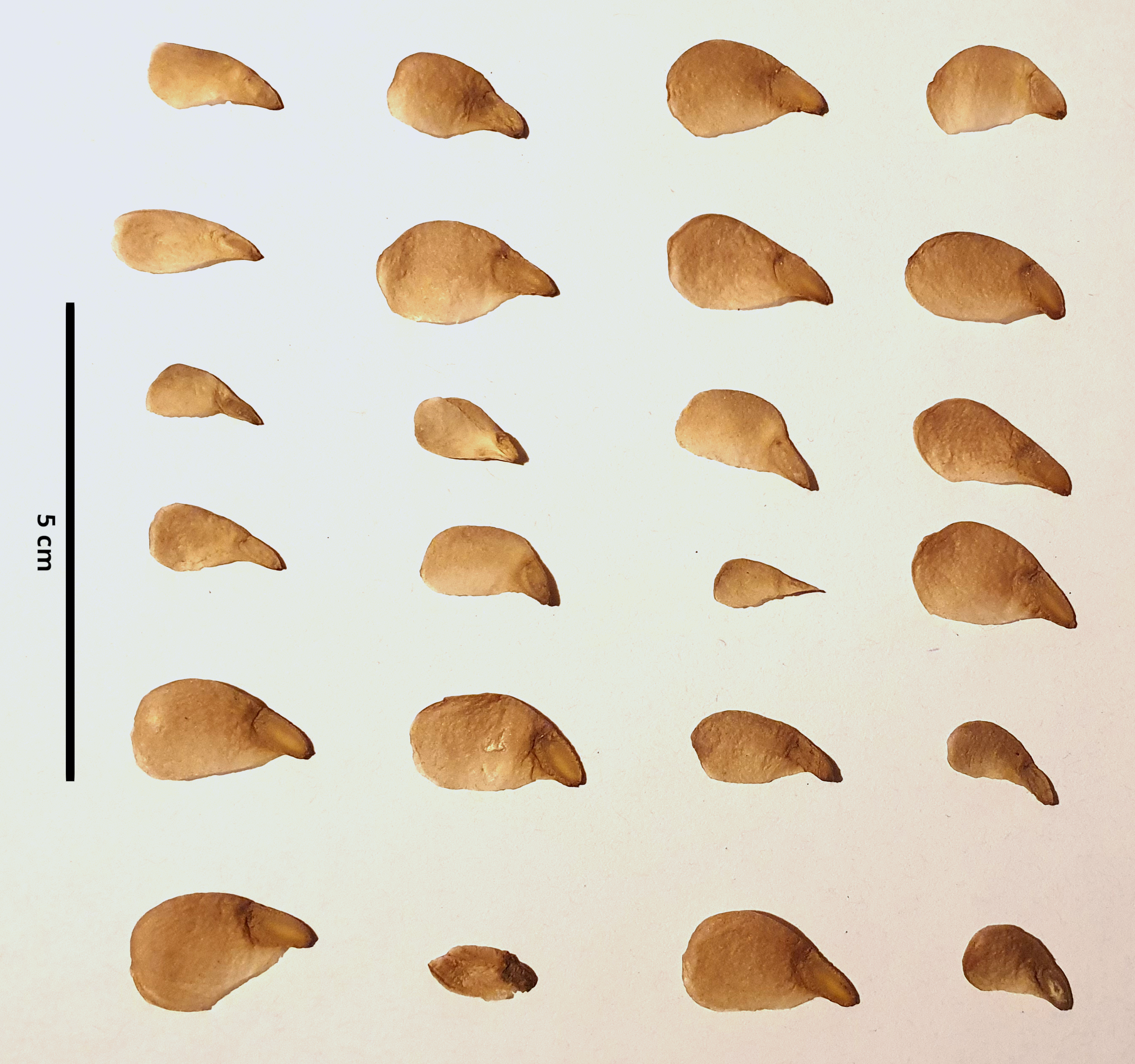
Papery thin seeds of Pamianthe peruviana

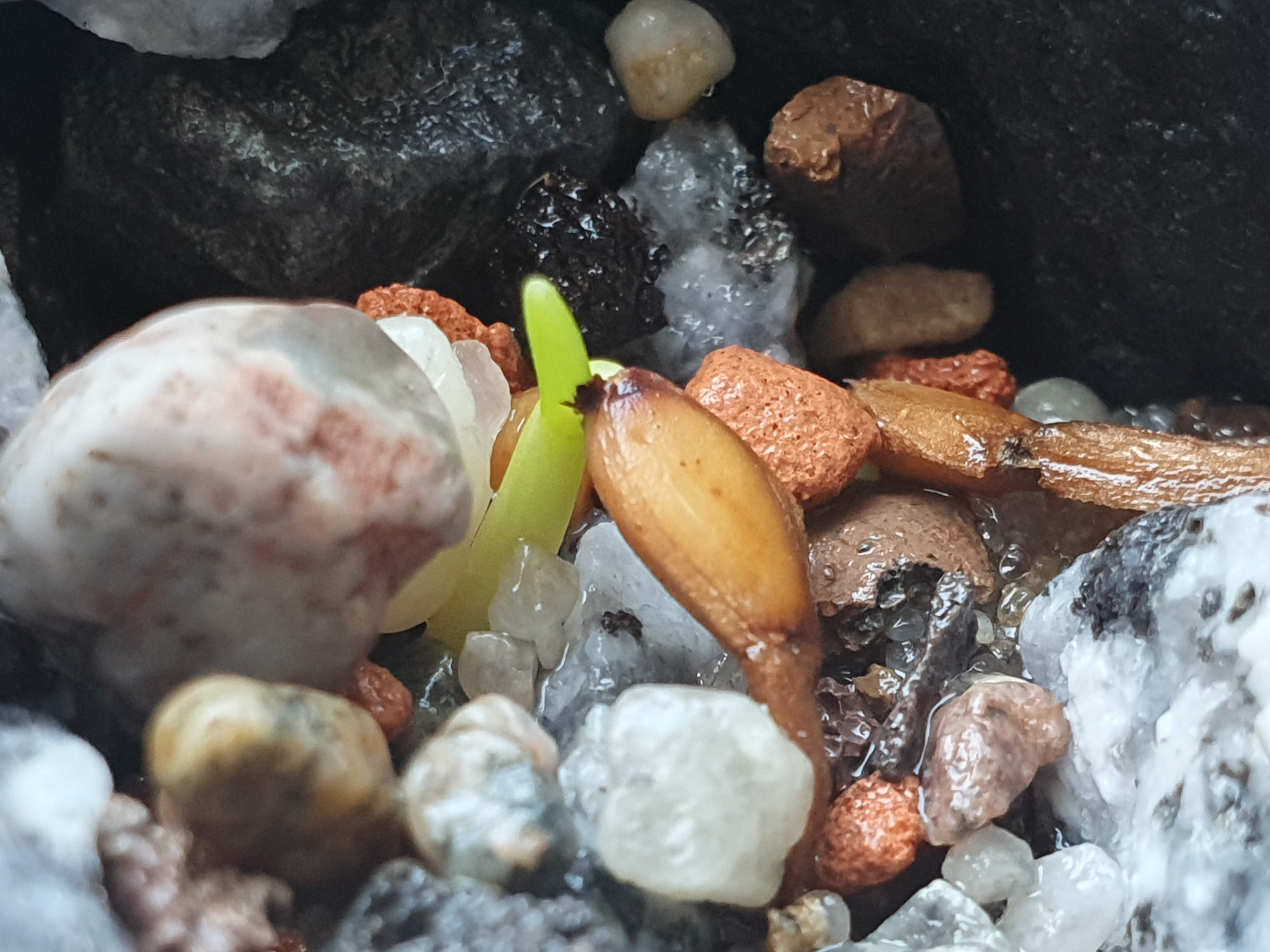
Germinating Pamianthe peruviana seed with emerging leaf

The bisexual, radially symmetrical flowers are intensely fragrant. They resemble the flowers of Pancratium. They are produced in groups of 2-4 flowers, which have a 12–25 cm long perianth tube with three nectariferous channels. These features could suggest moth pollination. The pedicel is 1.5–3 cm long. With 8 cm of length, the outer tepals are slightly longer than the 7 cm long staminal cup. The incurved stamens with dorsifixed anthers are inserted in deep notches of the staminal cup, or corona. The flowers are self compatible and the fruit takes 12–15 months to mature. Rapid germination occurs under humid conditions at 16-21 °C. Seedlings reach maturity within four to five years.

=== Cytology ===
The diploid chromosome count of Pamianthe is 2n = 46.

== Taxonomy ==
It was described by Otto Stapf in 1933. The type specimen was cultivated by Albert Pam in the United Kingdom. Pamianthe peruviana is the type species of the genus Pamianthe. It was either first discovered in 1926 on a bulb collecting expedition in Peru or bulbs were received from Peru in 1928. Pam, who introduced the species to horticulture, was a friend of the horticulturalist Edward Augustus Bowles (1865 - 1954), to whom he gave a Pamianthe peruviana specimen in the 1930s. He also donated Pamianthe peruviana to the Royal Botanic Gardens, Kew in 1937. Despite being the same taxon, it has been reported that Pamianthe cardenasii were a bulbous geophyte, and Pamianthe peruviana were an epiphyte. Some degree of possible hybridization was identified between Pamianthe peruviana and Pamianthe ecollis. According to a molecular clock analysis, both species shared a common ancestor 18.22 million years ago. This means Pamianthe peruviana diverged in the early Miocene.

=== Etymology ===
The generic name Pamianthe refers to Major Albert Pam. The specific epithet peruviana references this species origin in Peru.

== Distribution and habitat ==
It was found along streams in the warm to temperate northern region of Peru at elevations of 1800 m above sea level.

== Ecology ==
Pamianthe is presumed to be moth pollinated based on their floral morphology. Specifically sphingid moths come into question.

== Conservation ==
It is presumed to be extinct in the wild. It is not known when it was last recorded. According to the Cambridge Botanic Garden the conservation status has not been evaluated. Under its synonym Pamianthe cardenasii Traub it has also been classified as not evaluated by the national herbarium of Bolivia in 2005.

Ex-situ conservation is ensured in several living collections, such as the living collection of the Gothenburg Botanical Garden, the Royal Botanic Garden Edinburgh Living Plant Collections, the Oxford Botanic Garden, as well as private collections.

== Cultivation ==
Despite it being very rare in cultivation, it can be easily cultivated as a houseplant if kept in a well aerated substrate, because it is intolerant of waterlogged conditions, which rapidly induce root rot. Ideally, it should be cultivated under moderately bright, humid conditions at temperatures of 18-30 °C. Seeds can be sown all year round. The optimal time is March–August. The remaining months are less optimal. The germination temperature should not be below 20 °C. Pamianthe makes a good greenhouse or container display. It is also suitable as a long-lasting cut flower.
