= Pamianthe parviflora =

Conservation status
- Vulnerable (IUCN 3.1)

Scientific classification
- Kingdom: Plantae
- Clade: Tracheophytes
- Clade: Angiosperms
- Clade: Monocots
- Order: Asparagales
- Family: Amaryllidaceae
- Subfamily: Amaryllidoideae
- Genus: Pamianthe
- Species: P. parviflora

Binomial name
- Pamianthe parviflora Meerow

Species of flowering plant

Pamianthe parviflora is a species of flowering plant in the family Amaryllidaceae. It is endemic to Ecuador. Its natural habitat is subtropical or tropical moist montane forests. It is threatened by habitat loss.
