= List of Award of Garden Merit narcissus =

Below is a selected list of Narcissus species, varieties and cultivars which currently (2020) hold the Royal Horticultural Society's Award of Garden Merit (AGM). Narcissus (daffodils) are bulbous perennials which are usually planted as dormant bulbs in autumn (fall) to flower the following spring. Once established they flower reliably every year, with variously trumpet-shaped flowers in a range of colours, mostly shades of white and yellow. The central trumpet (corona) and the outer 'petals' (perianth segments) often have contrasting colours. Breeders have produced a huge range of sizes and shapes in these flowers, which are among the most popular of all plants in cultivation.

== Divisions ==
Plants are grouped by the RHS into 13 divisions, each describing a particular growth habit and flower shape. All are of garden origin except group 13.

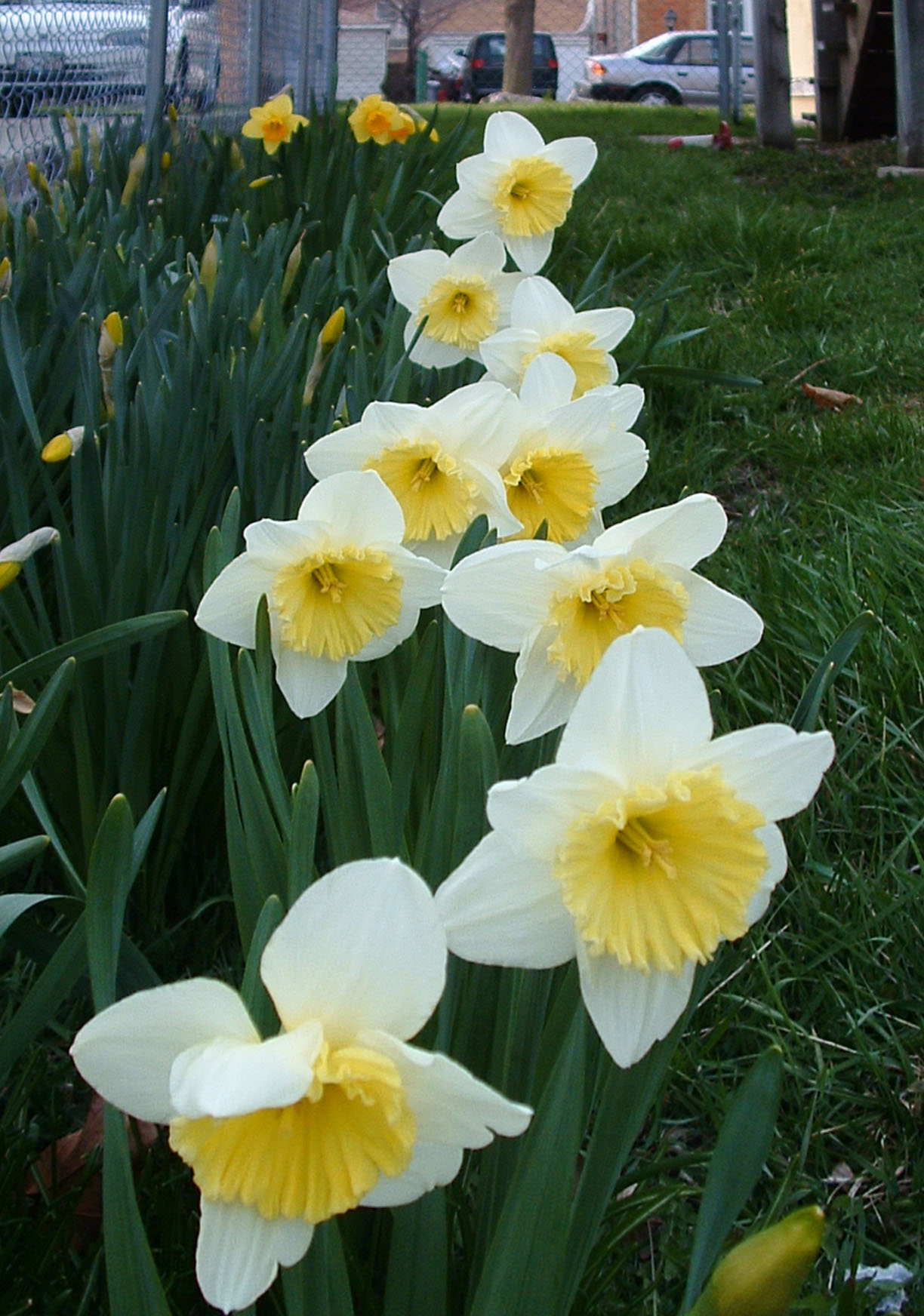
'Ice Follies' (Division 2)

1. Trumpet Daffodil cultivars: solitary flower with corona (trumpet) longer than perianth (outer petals)
2. Large-cupped Daffodil cultivars: corona shorter than perianth
3. Small-cupped Daffodil cultivars: corona less than ⅓ of the length of the perianth
4. Double flowered Daffodil cultivars
5. Triandrus Daffodil cultivars: reflexed perianth, short corona
6. Cyclamineus Daffodil cultivars: angled flowers, reflexed perianth, long corona
7. Jonquilla and Apodanthus Daffodil cultivars: scented, late-flowering, shallow cupped
8. Tazetta Daffodil cultivars: multiple flowers, scented, autumn-spring flowering
9. Poeticus Daffodil cultivars: scented, white perianth, small corona
10. Bulbocodium Daffodil cultivars: large corona, small perianth
11. (a) Split-corona Daffodil cultivars: Collar (b) Split-corona: Papillon
12. Other Daffodil cultivars
13. Daffodils distinguished solely by botanical name: all wild Narcissus species (including hybrids distinguished solely by botanical name)

The main flowering season is late February and March in the Northern Hemisphere. Early daffodils appear from November through early February, while late varieties may appear in April, depending on the weather.

== Narcissus species & cultivars ==
The AGM citation includes a hardiness rating: most of the narcissi listed here are rated H6 (−20 to −15 °C (−4 to 5 °F)]), but some are H4 (−10 to −5 °C (14 to 23 °F)]). These are indicated in brackets next to the name. Dimensions shown are all maximum heights; heights may vary according to climatic conditions. The notes show whether the flowers are double or scented, also links to the names' sources

Name	Div.	Season	Perianth colour	Corona colour	Height	Ref.	Notes	Image
'Actaea'	9	late	white	yellow/red	45 cm (18 in)		scented	
'Andrew's Choice'	7	early	yellow	orange-yellow	55 cm (22 in)		scented	
'Angel's Breath'	5	mid	yellow (pale)	yellow (pale)	32 cm (13 in)			
'Arctic Gold'	1	mid	yellow	yellow	40 cm (16 in)			
'Arkle'	1	mid	yellow	yellow	40 cm (16 in)		(Arkle)	
'Avalanche' (H4)	8	mid	white	yellow/orange	35 cm (14 in)		scented	
'Badbury Rings'	3	mid	pale yellow	bright yellow	45 cm (18 in)		scented (Badbury Rings)	
'Barnum'	1	early	yellow	yellow	50 cm (20 in)		(Barnum)	
'Bell Rock'	1	mid	white	yellow (lemon)	42 cm (17 in)			
'Border Beauty'	2	mid	yellow	orange	40 cm (16 in)			
'Boslowick'	11a	mid-late	yellow	orange	50 cm (20 in)		(Boslowick)	
'Bravoure'	1	mid	white	yellow	45 cm (18 in)			
'Bridal Crown'	4		white	yellow	30 cm (12 in)		scented	
'Bryanston'	2	mid	yellow	yellow	40 cm (16 in)		(Bryanston)	
'Carib Gipsy'	2		yellow (lemon)	white-yellow	50 cm (20 in)			
'Carlton'	2		yellow (bright)	yellow (pale)	50 cm (20 in)			
'Chanson'	1	early-mid	white	pink (peach)	50 cm (20 in)			
'Cheerfulness'	4	mid	pale yellow	yellow	40 cm (16 in)		double, scented	
'Chit Chat' (H4)	7	late	yellow	yellow	17 cm (7 in)		scented	
'Chromacolor'	2		white	orange-pink	50 cm (20 in)			
'Chukar'	4		white	orange	40 cm (16 in)		double	
'Classic Gold'	10	early	yellow	yellow	20 cm (8 in)		scented	
'Cornish Chuckles'	10	early-mid	yellow	yellow	45 cm (18 in)			
'Crackington'	4	early	yellow	yellow	40 cm (16 in)		(Crackington) double	
'Curlew'	7	mid-late	white	white	30 cm (12 in)		(Curlew) scented	
'Desdemona'	2	mid	white	white	50 cm (20 in)		(Desdemona)	
'Dickcissel'	7	early	yellow	yellow/white	50 cm (20 in)		(Dickcissel) scented	
'Dinnerplate'	2	early-mid	white	yellow	50 cm (20 in)			
'Doctor Hugh'	3	mid	white	orange	50 cm (20 in)			
'Dutch Lemon Drops'	5	early-mid	yellow (lemon)	yellow	40 cm (16 in)			
'Dutch Master'	1	mid	yellow	yellow	45 cm (18 in)			
'Elka'	1	early	white	yellow/white	26 cm (10 in)			
'Falconet'	8	early	yellow	orange	40 cm (16 in)			
'February Gold'	6	early	yellow	yellow	30 cm (12 in)			
'Gay Kybo'	4	mid	cream	orange	45 cm (18 in)		double	
'Geranium'	8	mid-late	white	orange	35 cm (14 in)		scented	
'Gold Convention'	2		yellow (deep)	yellow (deep)	50 cm (20 in)			
'Golden Dawn' (H4)	8		yellow	orange	50 cm (20 in)		scented	
'Goldfinger'	1	mid	yellow	yellow	43 cm (17 in)		(Goldfinger)	
'Hambledon'	2		yellow/cream	yellow	50 cm (20 in)			
'Hawera'	5	late	yellow	yellow	18 cm (7 in)			
'Heamoor'	4	early-mid	yellow (deep)	yellow (deep)	50 cm (20 in)		(Heamoor) double	
'High Society'	2	mid	white	cream/pink	55 cm (22 in)			
'Highfield Beauty'	8		yellow (cream)	orange-yellow	50 cm (20 in)		scented	
'Hillstar'	7	mid	yellow/white	white/yellow	35 cm (14 in)			
'Homestead'	2		white	cream	50 cm (20 in)			
'Hoopoe'	8	early-mid	yellow	orange	60 cm (24 in)		(Hoopoe) scented	
'Ice Follies'	2	mid	white	pale yellow	40 cm (16 in)			
'Ice Wings'	5	mid	white	white	35 cm (14 in)			
'Indian Maid'	7	mid-late	orange	red	50 cm (20 in)		(Indian Maid) fragrant	
'Irish Minstrel'	2		white	yellow	40 cm (16 in)			
'Itzim'	6		yellow	orange	45 cm (18 in)			
'Jack Snipe'	6	early-mid	cream	yellow	20 cm (8 in)			
'Jenny'	6	early-mid	cream	yellow	30 cm (12 in)			
'Jetfire'	6	early	cream	yellow	20 cm (8 in)			
'Jumblie'	12	early	yellow	deep yellow	17 cm (7 in)			
'Katherine Jenkins'	7	mid	yellow	orange	50 cm (20 in)		(Katherine Jenkins) scented	
'Kaydee'	6	mid	white	pink	35 cm (14 in)			
'Kokopelli'	7	mid	yellow	yellow	30 cm (12 in)		(Kokopelli) scented	
'Le Torch'	4		yellow (deep)	orange	50 cm (20 in)		double	
'Lingerie'	4		white/yellow	white/yellow	50 cm (20 in)		double	
'Little Gem'	1	early	yellow	yellow	15 cm (6 in)			
'Manly'	4	early-mid	pale yellow	pale yellow	45 cm (18 in)		double	
'Menehay'	11a		yellow	orange	50 cm (20 in)			
'Merlin'	3	mid	white	yellow/orange	45 cm (18 in)			
'Minnow'	8	mid	white	pale yellow	18 cm (7 in)			
'Mint Julep'	3	mid	yellow	yellow	50 cm (20 in)		(Mint julep)	
'Mission Bells'	5	mid	white	white	25 cm (10 in)			
'Mite'	6	early	yellow	yellow	22 cm (9 in)			
'Mount Hood'	1	mid	white	white	45 cm (18 in)		(Mount Hood)	
'My Story'	4	mid	white	pink (salmon)	45 cm (18 in)		double	
N. bulbocodium (H4)	13		yellow	yellow	15 cm (6 in)			
N. cyclamineus	13	early	yellow	yellow	20 cm (8 in)			
N. minor (H5)	13	early	yellow	yellow	15 cm (6 in)			
N. moschatus (Swan's neck daffodil)	13	early-mid	white (cream)	white (cream)	20 cm (8 in)			
N. obvallaris (Tenby daffodil)	13	early	yellow	yellow	30 cm (12 in)			
N. poeticus var. recurvus	13	late	white	yellow/red	35 cm (14 in)		scented	
N. romieuxii (H4)	13	early	yellow	pale yellow	10 cm (4 in)			
'Notre Dame'	2	late	white	yellow/orange	45 cm (18 in)			
'Passionale'	2		white	pink	40 cm (16 in)			
'Patrick Hacket'	1	early	yellow	yellow	42 cm (17 in)			
'Peeping Tom'	6		yellow	yellow	40 cm (16 in)		(Peeping Tom)	
'Penkivel'	2	mid	white	pink (peach)	50 cm (20 in)			
'Pineapple Prince'	2		yellow (lemon)	white	40 cm (16 in)			
'Pinza'	2	early	yellow	orange	40 cm (16 in)			
'Precocious'	2	mid	pale yellow	pale yellow	40 cm (16 in)			
'Punchline'	7		cream	yellow (apricot)	50 cm (20 in)			
'Quail'	7	mid	yellow	yellow	40 cm (16 in)		scented	
'Quasar'	7	mid	white	orange	60 cm (24 in)		(Quasar)	
'Queen Beatrix'	1	mid-late	yellow	yellow	50 cm (20 in)		(Queen Beatrix)	
'Rainbow'	2	mid	white	white/orange	45 cm (18 in)		scented	
'Rapture'	6	early	yellow	yellow	35 cm (14 in)			
'Reggae'	6	mid	white	pink	25 cm (10 in)		(Reggae)	
'Rijnveld's Early Sensation'	1	early	white	pink	35 cm (14 in)			
'Rising Star'	7	early-mid	white	pink	40 cm (16 in)		scented	
'Romance'	2		white	pink/orange	50 cm (20 in)			
'Rosemoor Gold'	7	mid	yellow	yellow (deep)	50 cm (20 in)		(Rosemoor) scented	
'Sabrosa' (H4)	7		yellow (lemon)	yellow (lemon)	08 cm (3 in)		(Sabrosa)	
'Sailboat'	7	mid	yellow (pale)	white	40 cm (16 in)		scented	
'Saint Keverne'	2		yellow	yellow	45 cm (18 in)		(St Keverne)	
'Salome'	2	mid	white	peach	30 cm (12 in)		(Salome)	
'Segovia'	3		white	yellow (pale)	20 cm (8 in)			
'Serena Lodge'	4	late	white	peach	50 cm (20 in)			
'Sint Victor'	1	mid	yellow	yellow	50 cm (20 in)		scented	
'Sir Winston Churchill'	4		white	orange	40 cm (16 in)		(Winston Churchill) scented	
'Skilliwidden'	2	early	yellow	yellow				
'Small Talk'	1		yellow	yellow	15 cm (6 in)			
'Spindletop'	3	early-mid	white	yellow	50 cm (20 in)			
'Spoirot'	10	early-mid	white/green	white/green	20 cm (8 in)			
'Spring Essence'	2	early	white	yellow	50 cm (20 in)			
'Stratosphere'	7		yellow	yellow	50 cm (20 in)		scented	
'Sun Disc'	7		yellow (light)	yellow (light)	15 cm (6 in)		scented	
'Surfside'	6	late	cream	yellow (pale)	20 cm (8 in)			
'Suzy'	7	mid	yellow	orange	40 cm (16 in)		scented	
'Sweetness'	7	mid	white	white	40 cm (16 in)		scented	
'Tahiti'	4	mid	yellow	yellow/orange	45 cm (18 in)		double	
'Tamar Fire'	4		yellow (deep)	orange-red	50 cm (20 in)		scented	
'Tête-à-tête'	12	early	yellow (light)	yellow	20 cm (8 in)			
'Topolino'	1		cream	yellow (lemon)	15 cm (6 in)			
'Toto'	12		white	cream	20 cm (8 in)			
'Trebah'	2	early-mid	yellow (deep)	yellow (deep)	45 cm (18 in)		(Trebah)	
'Trena'	6	mid-late	white	yellow (lemon)	30 cm (12 in)			
'Trigonometry'	11a		white	pink/cream	50 cm (20 in)		(Trigonometry)	
'Tripartite'	11a	late	yellow	yellow	45 cm (18 in)			
'Triple Crown'	3	mid	yellow	yellow/red	50 cm (20 in)			
'Tuesday's Child'	5	mid	white	pale yellow	35 cm (14 in)		(Tuesday's Child)	
'Twinkling Yellow'	7	early-late	yellow	yellow	50 cm (20 in)		scented	
'Tyrone Gold'	1	early	yellow	yellow	45 cm (18 in)			
'Unique'	4	early	white	yellow	65 cm (26 in)		double	
'Vernal Prince '	3	mid	white	yellow (pale)	50 cm (20 in)			
'Verona'	3	mid	white	cream	45 cm (18 in)			
'Viking'	1	mid	yellow	yellow	45 cm (18 in)			
'Warbler'	6	mid	yellow	yellow				
'Wheal Coates'	7	mid-late	yellow	orange	70 cm (28 in)		(Wheal Coates) fragrant	
'Wheatear'	6	mid	yellow	white			(Wheatear)	
'White Lion'	4		white	yellow (pale)	45 cm (18 in)		double	
'Wimbledon County Girl'	2	early-mid	yellow	yellow	50 cm (20 in)			
'Wisley'	6		white	yellow	50 cm (20 in)		(Wisley)	
'Yellow Cheerfulness'	4	mid	yellow	yellow	45 cm (18 in)		double, scented	
