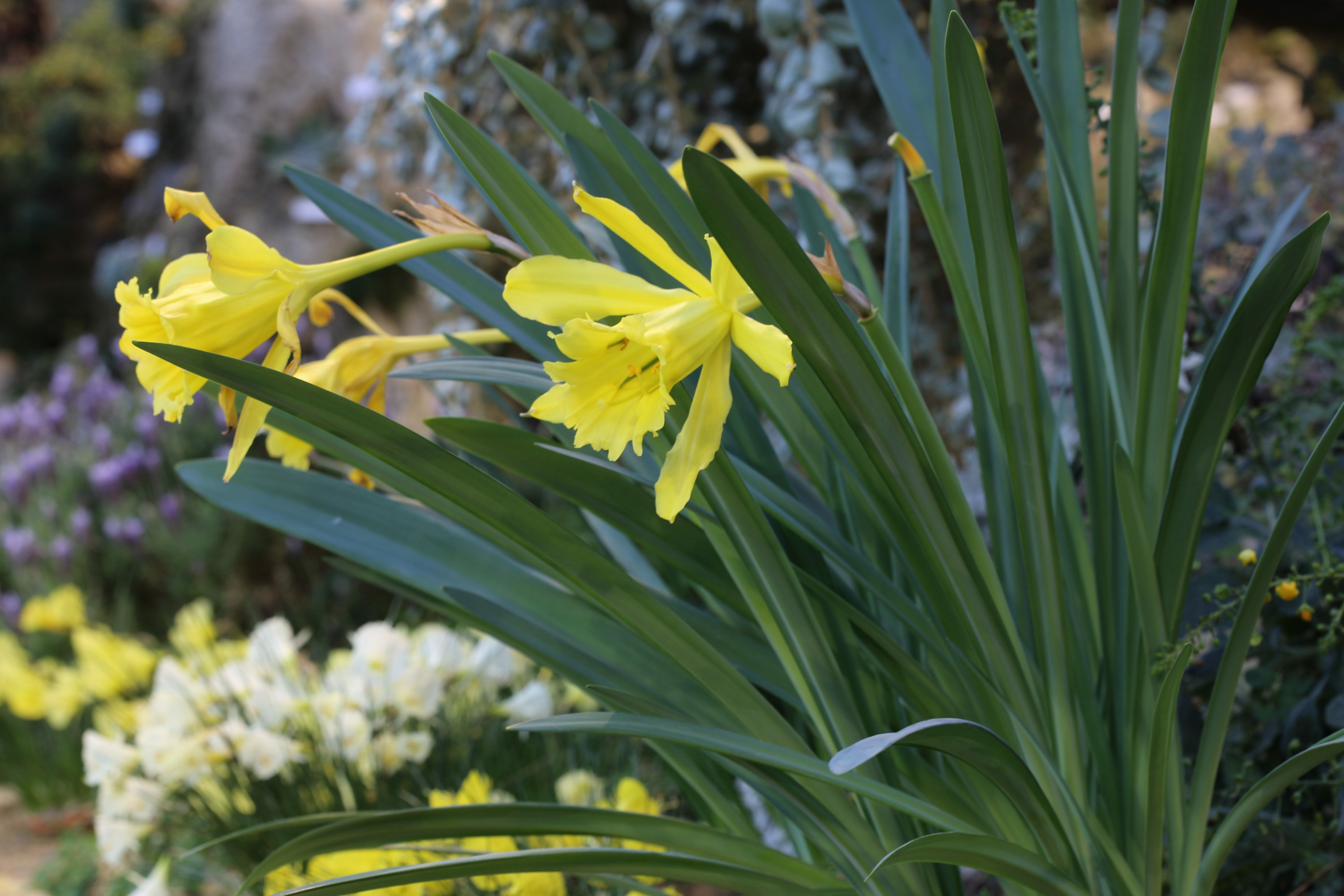
- Paramongaia weberbaueri
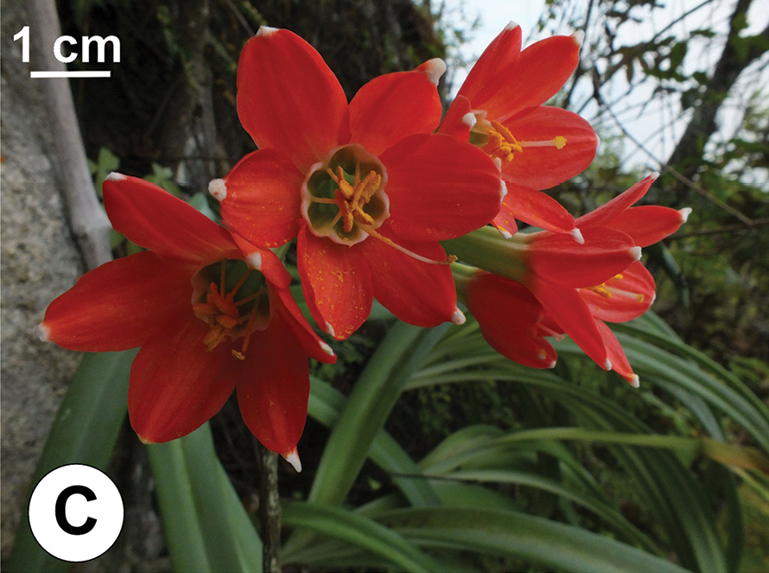
- Detail of Paramongaia milagroantha flowers

Scientific classification
- Kingdom: Plantae
- Clade: Tracheophytes
- Clade: Angiosperms
- Clade: Monocots
- Order: Asparagales
- Family: Amaryllidaceae
- Subfamily: Amaryllidoideae
- Tribe: Clinantheae
- Genus: Paramongaia; Velarde

Type species
- Paramongaia weberbaueri Velarde

Synonyms
- Anax Ravenna; Callithauma Herb.

= Paramongaia =

Species of plant

Paramongaia is a genus of South American plants in the family Amaryllidaceae, the most important species being Paramongaia weberbaueri found only in the Andes of Peru and Bolivia. Common names are "giant Peruvian daffodil", and Cojomaria. Its flower superficially resembles a 'King Alfred' daffodil, but the flower is much larger, up to 18.5 cm (7.3 in) long by 18.5 cm (7.3 in) wide with a corona 8.5 cm (3.3 in) by 8.5 cm (3.3 in) long by 8 cm (3.1 in) wide.

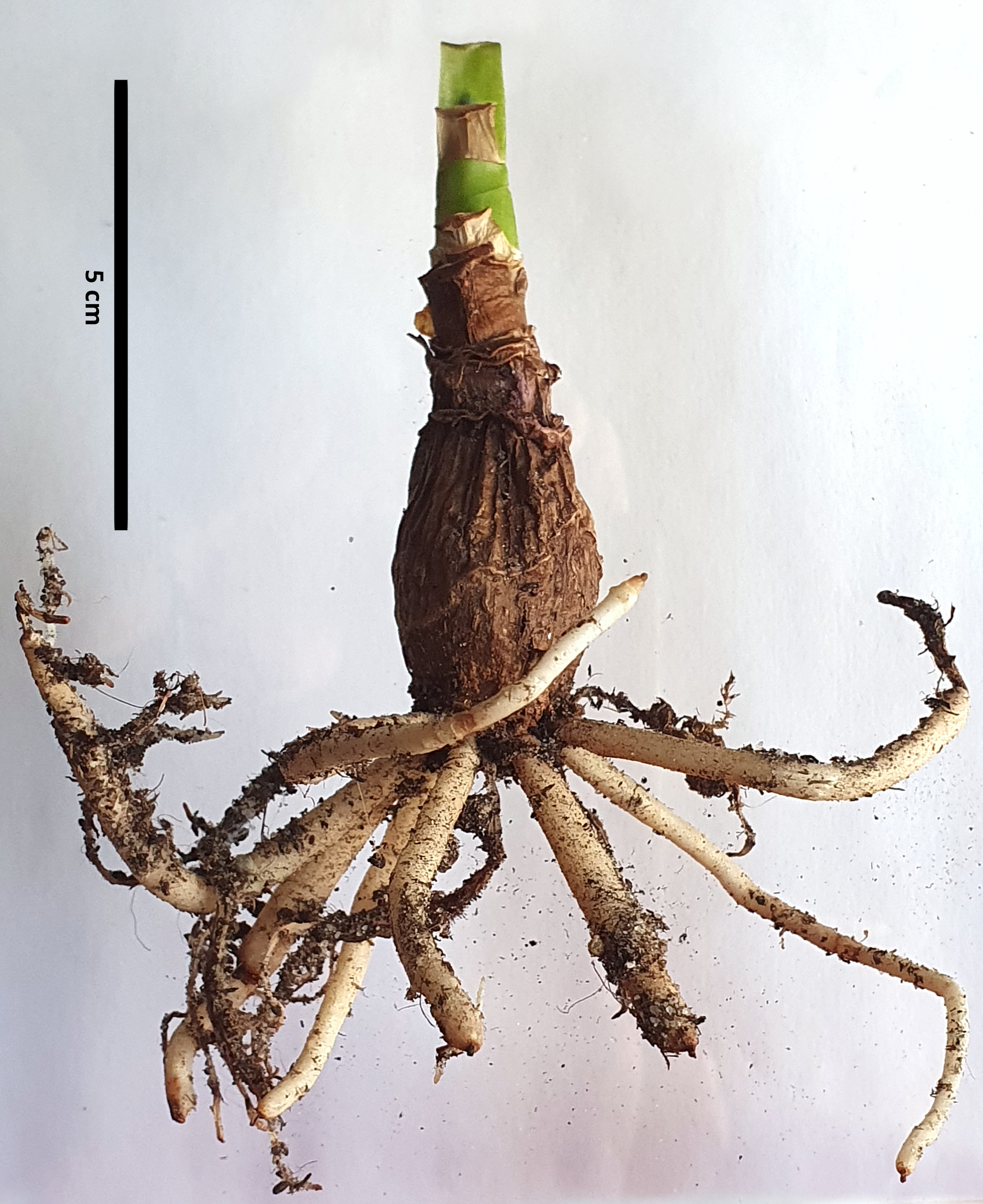
Immature bulb of Paramongaia weberbaueri Velarde

== Taxonomy ==
It was published by Octavio Velarde in 1949 with Paramongaia weberbaueri Velarde as the type species. After the genus was expanded, Paramongaia Velarde was conserved against the genus Callithauma Herb. published by William Herbert in 1837 with Callithauma viridiflorum (Ruiz & Pav.) Herb. as the type species.

=== Species ===
There are five recognized species:

- Paramongaia milagroantha (S.Leiva & Meerow) Meerow
- Paramongaia mirabile (Ravenna) Meerow
- Paramongaia multiflora Meerow
- Paramongaia viridiflora (Ruiz & Pav.) Meerow
- Paramongaia weberbaueri Velarde

== Phylogeny ==
The following relationships were reported:

- - - Paramongaia milagroantha
    - Paramongaia mirabile
  - - - Paramongaia viridiflora
      - Paramongaia multiflora
    - Paramongaia weberbaueri

== Etymology ==
The generic name Paramongaia refers to Paramonga, Peru.

== Conservation ==
The rare species Paramongaia weberbaueri has successfully been artificially propagated.

== Ecology ==
=== Pollination ===
The flowers may possibly be moth-pollinated.
