= Narcissus abscissus =

Scientific classification
- Kingdom: Plantae
- Clade: Tracheophytes
- Clade: Angiosperms
- Clade: Monocots
- Order: Asparagales
- Family: Amaryllidaceae
- Subfamily: Amaryllidoideae
- Genus: Narcissus
- Species: N. abscissus

Binomial name
- Narcissus abscissus (Haw.) Roem. & Schult.f.
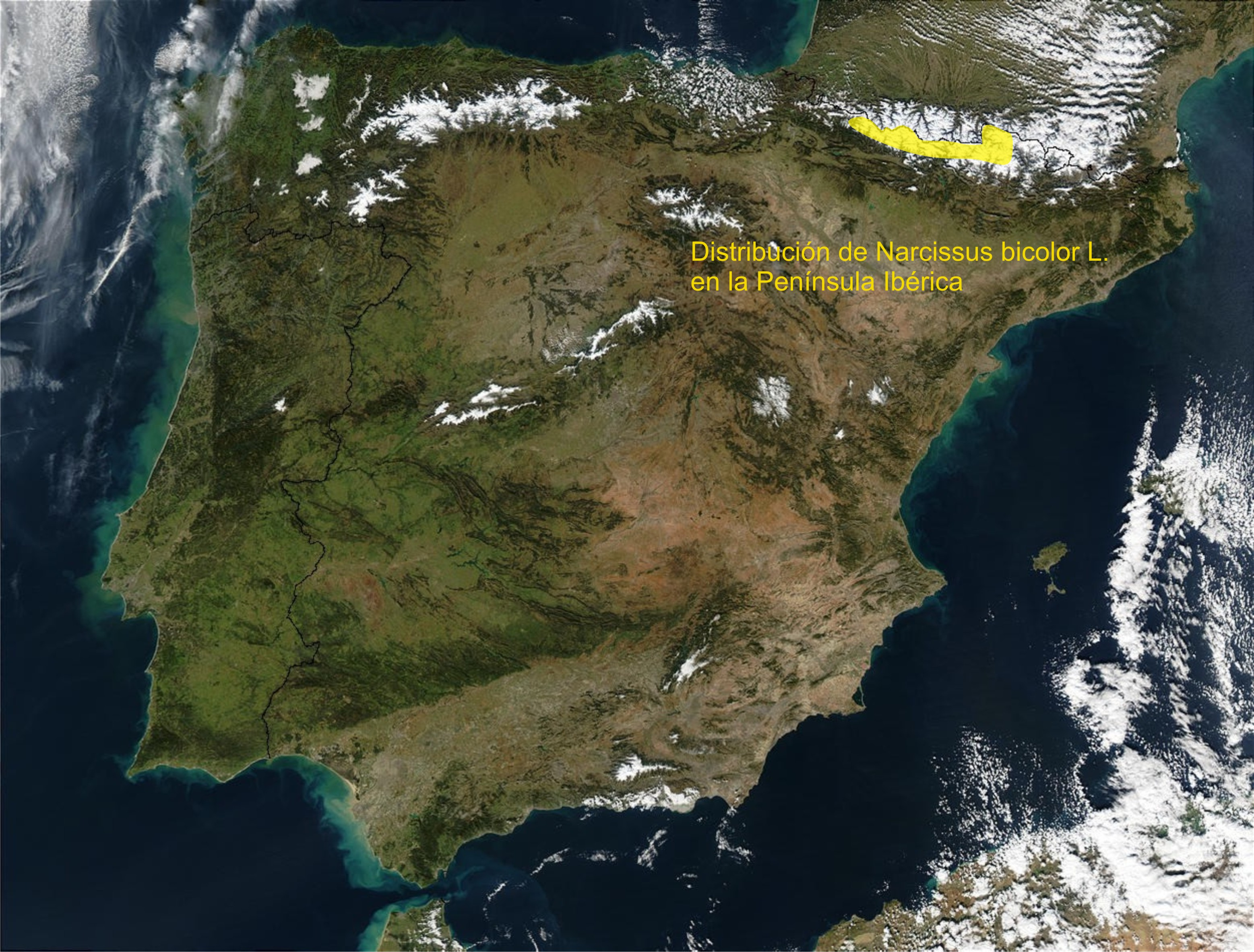
- Distribution range of N. abscissus and Narcissus pseudonarcissus subsp. bicolor (L.)

Synonyms
- Ajax abscissus Haw.; Narcissus pseudonarcissus subsp. abscissus (Haw.) K.Richt.

Species of daffodil

Narcissus abscissus is a species of the genus Narcissus (Daffodils) in the family Amaryllidaceae. It is classified in Section Pseudonarcissus. It is native to France and Spain in the region of the Pyrenees.

== Description ==
A classic daffodil; its leaves are green or slightly blue-green, erect, between two and four leaves, 30 cm long to approximately 1 cm wide. Its stem is compressed, sharply double-edged 35 cm long and its pedicel 2.5 cm long. Its flowers are solitary and horizontal with large blooms of 10 cm in diameter. The flowers are large with cream colored tepals and a deep yellow corona that does not expand distally. Narcissus abcissus blooms in late spring and grows on slopes and high mountain valleys of the Pyrenees along the French-Spanish border.

== Taxonomy ==
Narcissus abscissus was described by (Haw.) Schult. & Schult.f. and published on Syst. veg. 7: 941, in the year 1830.

=== Etymology ===
Narcissus: generic name that refers to the young narcissist from Greek mythology Νάρκισσος (Narkissos), son of the river god Cephissus and the nymph Liriope; that was distinguished by his beauty.

The name derives from the Greek word: ναρκὰο, narkào (= narcotic) and refers to the pungent and intoxicating smell of the flowers of some species (some argue that the word derives from the Persian word نرگس and is pronounced Nargis, indicating that this plant is intoxicating).

abscissus: Latin epithet meaning "cut".

=== Synonyms ===
- Ajax abscissus Haw.
- Ajax serotinus Jord.
- Ajax tubulosus Jord.
- Narcissus muticus J.Gay
- Narcissus pseudonarcissus subsp. abscissus (Haw.) K.Richt.
- Narcissus pseudonarcissus subsp. muticus (J.Gay) Baker
- Oileus abscissus (Haw.) Haw.

== Bibliography ==
- "Narcissus abscissus". Tropicos.org. Missouri Botanical Garden.
- Narcissus abscissus The Plant List
- Narcissus abscissus World Checklist
