= Narcissus 'King Alfred' =

Daffodil cultivar

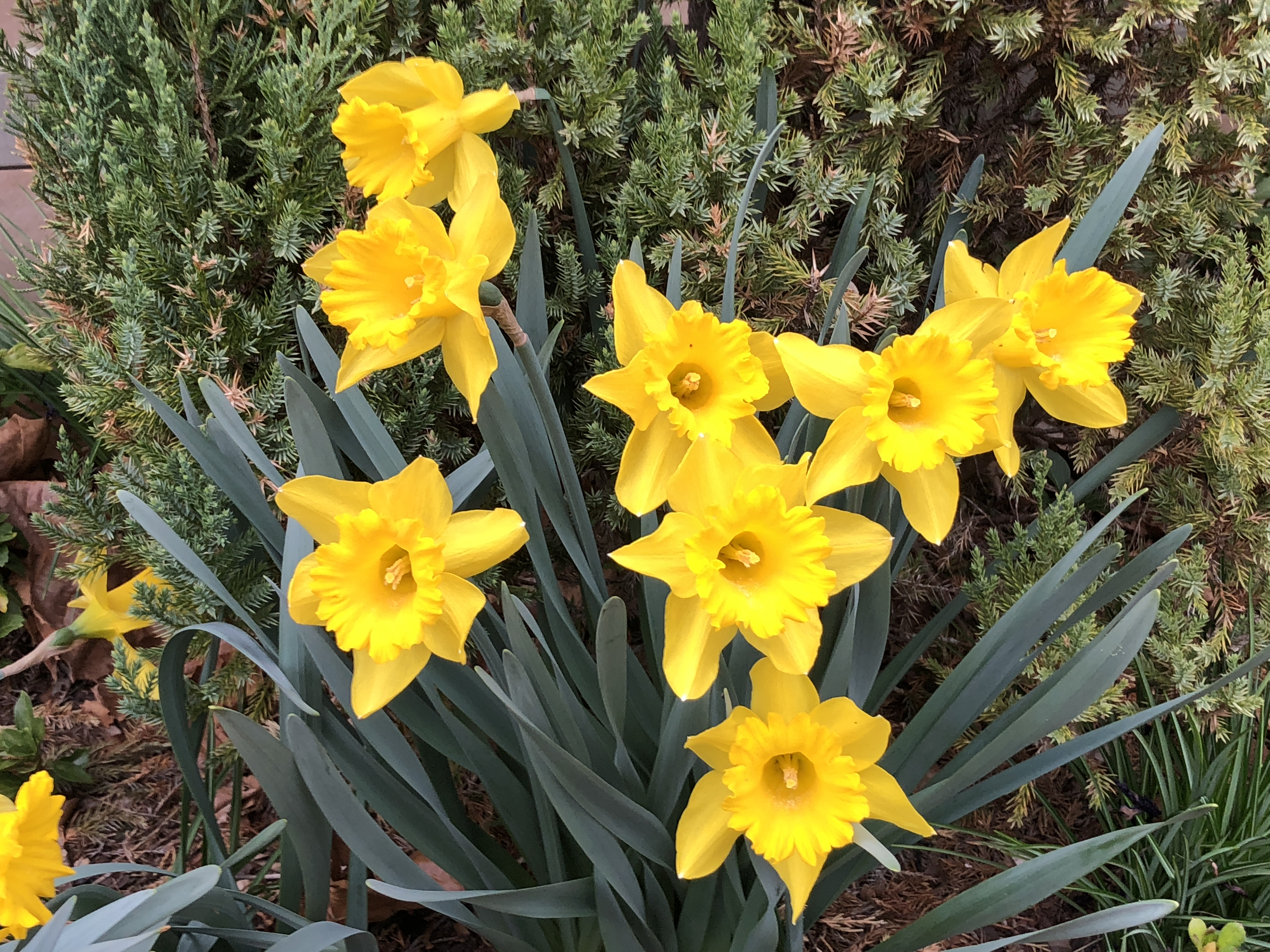
- Genus: Narcissus
- Hybrid parentage: Narcissus 'Emperor' × Narcissus 'Maximus'
- Cultivar: King Alfred
- Breeder: Walter Hill
- Origin: Devon, United Kingdom

Narcissus 'King Alfred' is a cultivar of daffodil which originates in the county of Devon, United Kingdom. The cultivar is named after English king of the Anglo-Saxons, Alfred the Great.

== Description ==
Narcissus 'King Alfred' is a bulbous perennial plant, which emerges in the spring. Leaves are green, narrow and strap-shaped. Stems possess single flowers, which are 10cm wide and golden yellow in colour. The perianth segments are slightly twisted and the trumpet is cylindrical with a serrated rim. Plants grow up to 40cm tall.

== History ==
The first step towards the cultivars creation was taken by a former solicitor known as John Kendall, who lived in Newton Poppleford. He is credited for successfully cross-pollinating Narcissus 'Emperor' and Narcissus 'Maximus' together before his death in 1890. The seedlings were then developed further by Walter Hill. Walter worked for John Kendall's son, Percy Kendall who owned both the market garden of Newton Poppleford and a florist shop in Sidmouth. Walter rented a property in the village where he painstakingly bred the daffodil, which would go on to be known as Narcissus 'King Alfred'.

In 1899, Percy Kendall brought Narcissus "King Alfred" before the Narcissus Committee of the Royal Horticultural Society. At its first showing, it was instantly recognised for its "best large yellow trumpet" and given the highest award of a First Class Certificate. It was originally registered in Kendell's name and was introduced into commercial distribution in 1900. At that time, a single bulb from the cultivar would be sold for 10 guineas each. In 1910, Percy died and Walter took over the rights to the daffodil he had bred. Walter became one of Newton Poppleford's largest employers selling "King Alfred" daffodil bulbs and flowers throughout the United Kingdom. During the flowering period of Narcissus 'King Alfred', hundreds of blooms would be sent by train to London. The sale of flowers and blooms continued after Walter's death in 1935.

Narcissus 'King Alfred' remained popular up until the 1950s, when new Narcissus cultivars with larger blooms, better form and greater performance began to be distributed. By the beginning of the 1950s, bulb production of Narcissus 'King Alfred' had dwindled to the point where it is rarely seen in cultivation outside of specialized nurseries by the 21st century. This is largely due to the fact that similar looking cultivars such as 'Dutch Master' are being falsely sold under the iconic name of 'King Alfred'. Many daffodils are also marketed and sold as "improved King Alfred" or "King Alfred type", which further causes confusion in the cultivars cultivation.

== Genetics ==
Narcissus 'King Alfred' possesses 28 chromosomes. Narcissus species like Narcissus hispanicus, Narcissus bicolor and Narcissus pseudonarcissus are all present in the cultivars ancestry. Despite having multiple hybridizations in its ancestry, 'King Alfred' is both seed and pollen fertile and has been used to produce various lesser known daffodil cultivars.
