= Narcissus 'Sun Disc' =

Daffodil cultivar

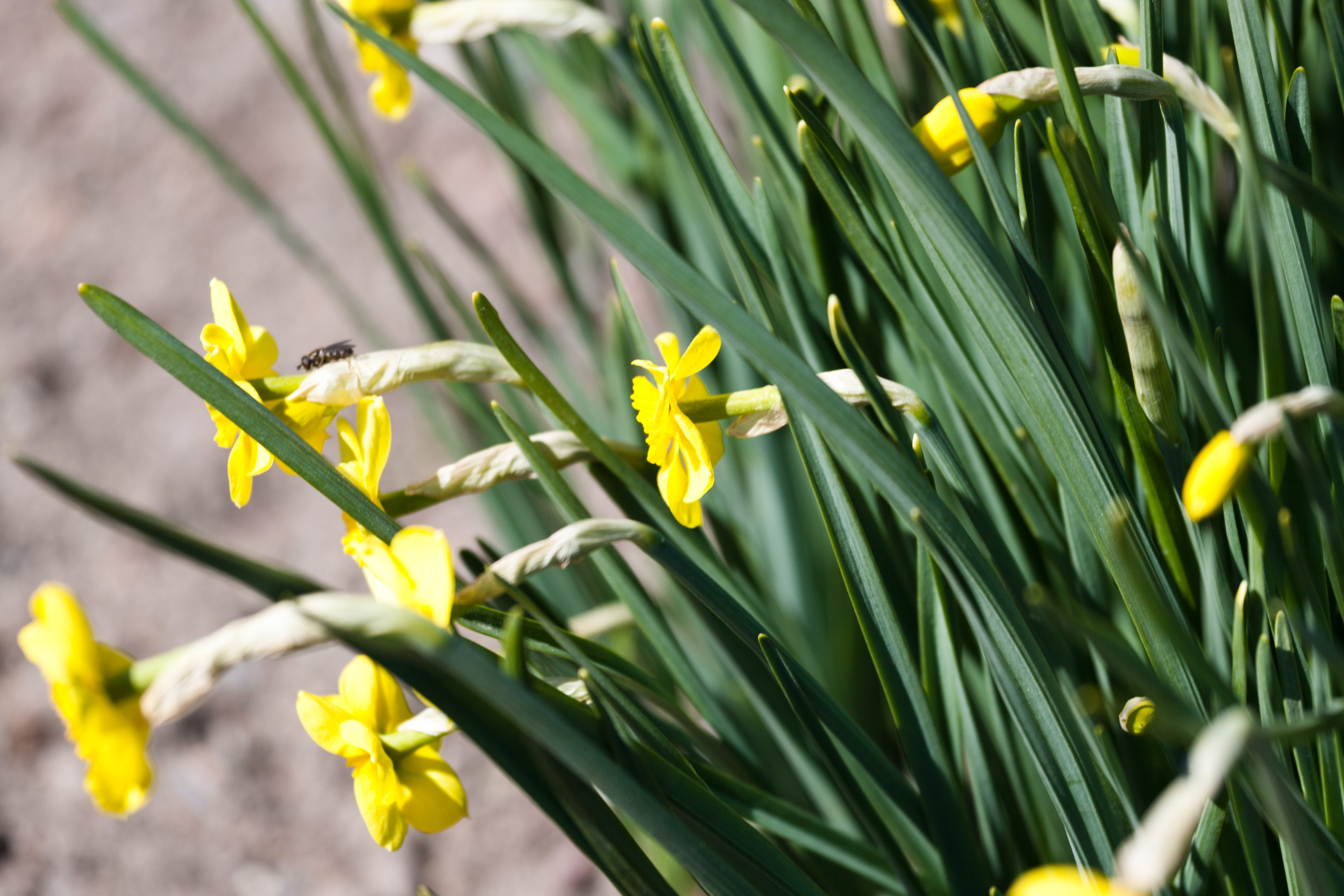
- Genus: Narcissus
- Hybrid parentage: Narcissus rupicola × Narcissus poeticus
- Cultivar: 'Sun Disc'
- Breeder: Alec Gray (1895-1986)
- Origin: Cornwall, United Kingdom

Narcissus 'Sun Disc' is a hybrid cultivar of daffodil, which was introduced in 1949. It is one of 110 cultivars produced by British daffodil breeder Alec Gray. The cultivar was produced by hybridizing Narcissus rupicola with Narcissus poeticus.

== Description ==
Narcissus 'Sun Disc' is a dwarf variety of daffodil. It is a bulbous perennial, which emerges in the Spring. Plants possess strap-like, green leaves and reach a maximum height of 15cm tall. Each mature bulb can produce a single stem, which can host from 1 to 3 flowers. Flowers are rounded, flat and 50mm wide. Blooms can possess either yellow or white petals, however the corona is short and always yellow.
