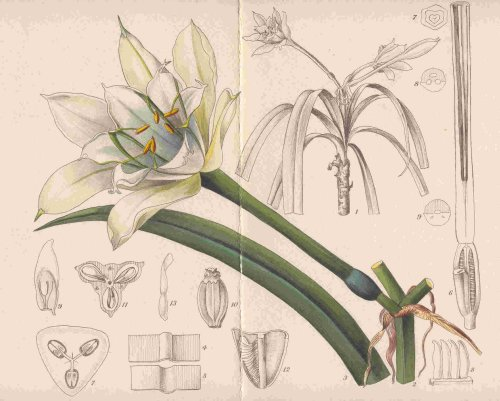
- Pamianthe peruviana

Scientific classification
- Kingdom: Plantae
- Clade: Embryophytes
- Clade: Tracheophytes
- Clade: Spermatophytes
- Clade: Angiosperms
- Clade: Monocots
- Order: Asparagales
- Family: Amaryllidaceae
- Subfamily: Amaryllidoideae
- Tribe: Clinantheae
- Genus: Pamianthe; Stapf

Type species
- Pamianthe peruviana Stapf

= Pamianthe =

Peruvian daffodil

Genus of flowering plants

Pamianthe is a genus of South American bulbous perennials in the Amaryllis family, subfamily Amaryllidoideae. They can be found in sandy, but rocky areas in Colombia, Ecuador, Peru, and Bolivia.

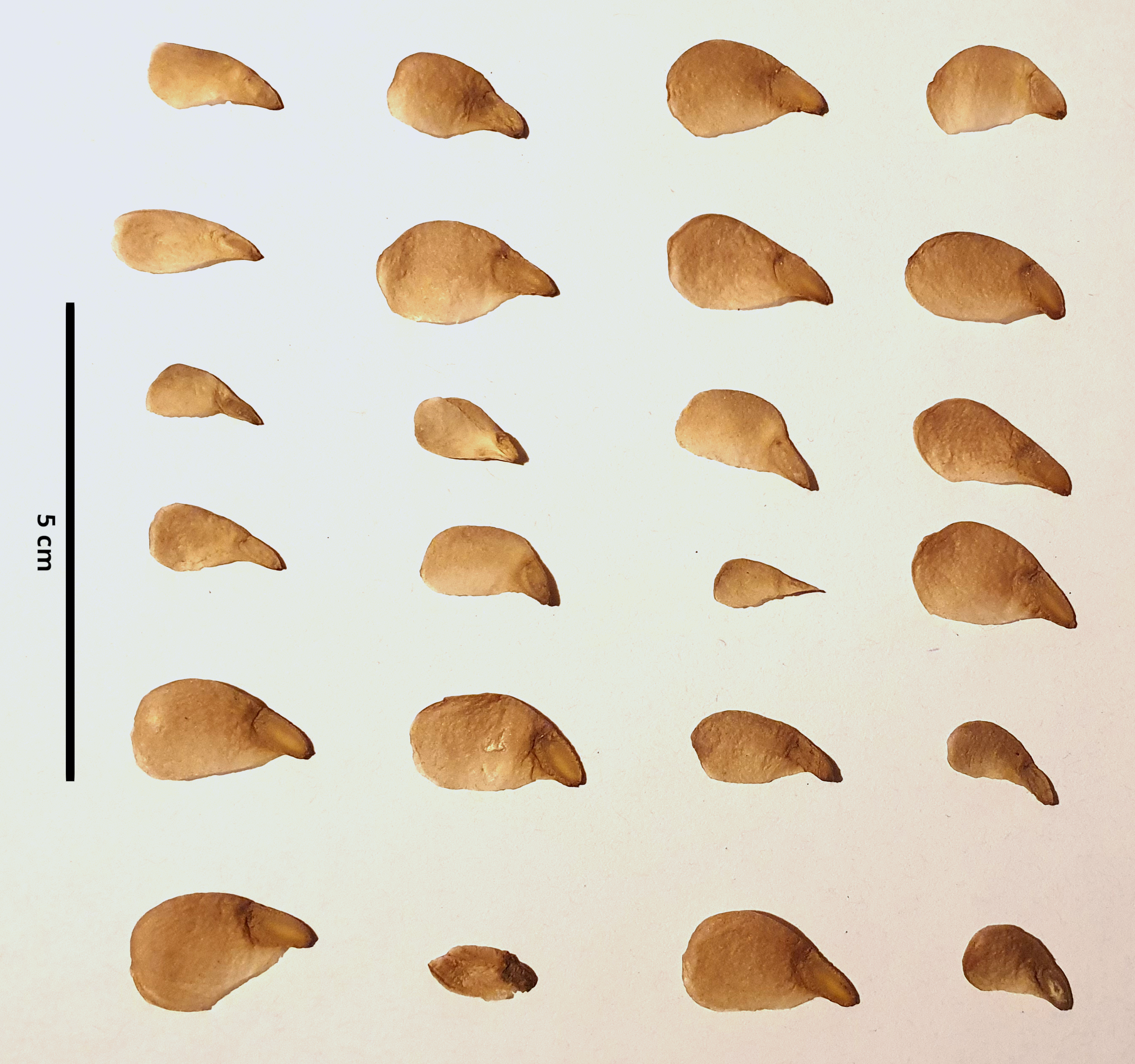
Papery thin seeds of Pamianthe peruviana

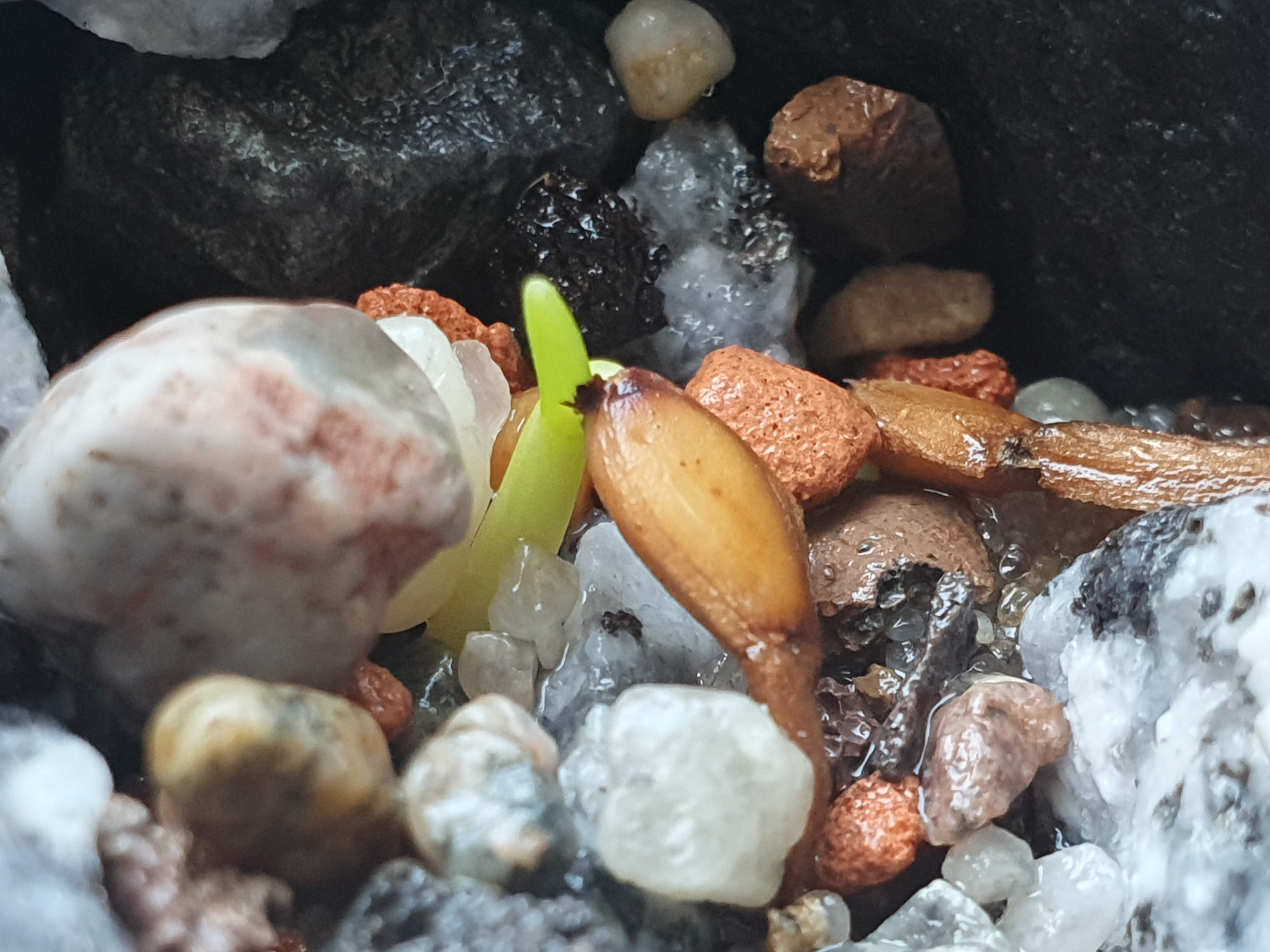
Germinating Pamianthe peruviana Stapf seed with emerging leaf

== Description ==
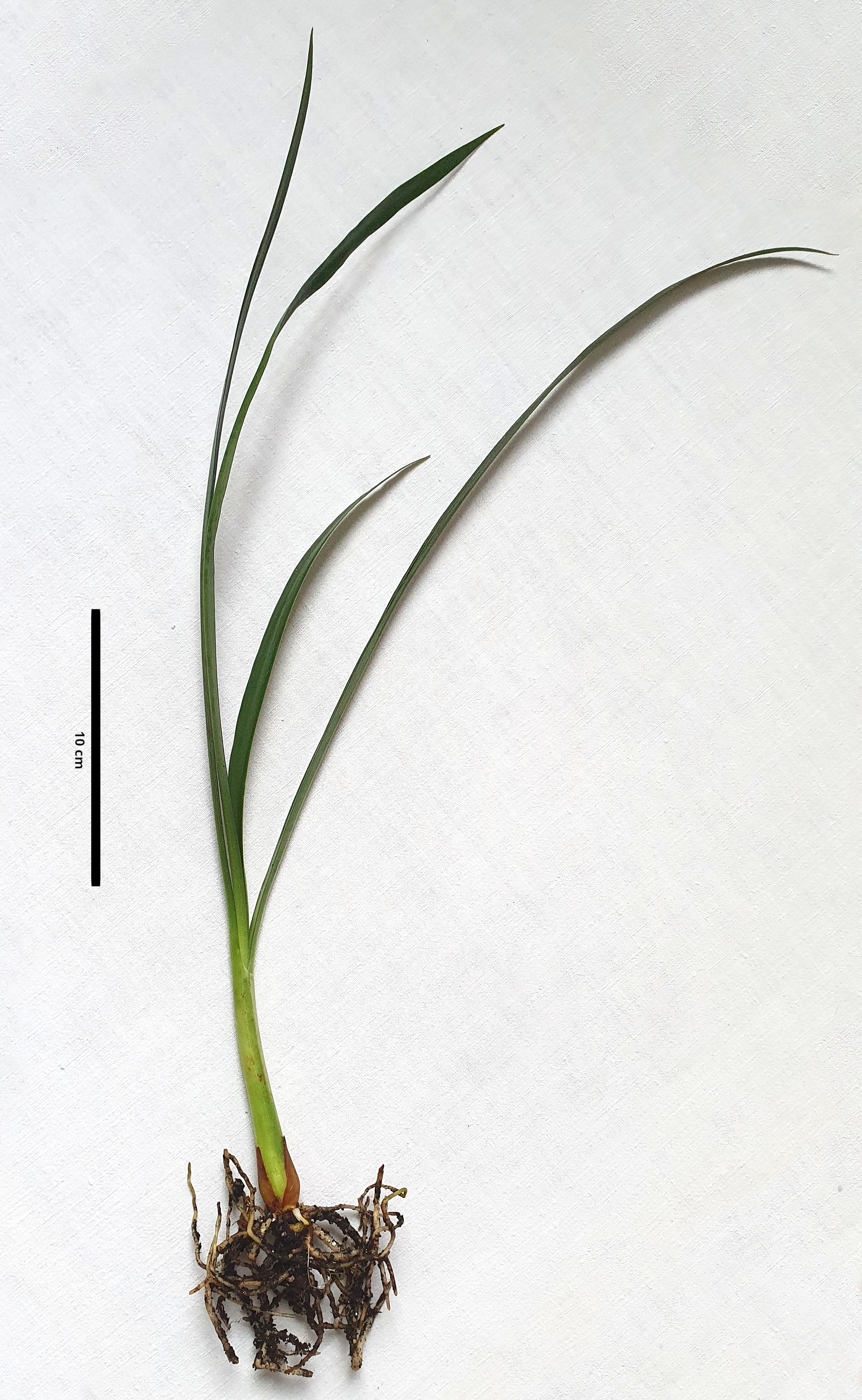
Immature Pamianthe peruviana Stapf bulb

=== Generative characteristics ===
The plants produce umbels of large, fragrant white flowers in the spring. They resemble daffodils, hence the common name Peruvian daffodil for at least one of the species. Pamianthe pollen grains are large and the surface structure is coarsely reticulate. The winged, flattened seeds of Pamianthe have a brownish-black seed coat.

== Taxonomy ==
It was published by Otto Stapf in 1933. The type species is Pamianthe peruviana Stapf. It is placed in the tribe Clinantheae.

=== Etymology ===
The genus name Pamianthe honours Major Albert Pam who imported plants to the United Kingdom in 1928.

=== Species ===
As of July 2019, Plants of the World Online accepts three species:

- Pamianthe ecollis Silverst., Meerow & Sánchez-Taborda – Colombia (Cauca)
- Pamianthe parviflora Meerow – Ecuador (Zamora-Chinchipe)
- Pamianthe peruviana Stapf (syn. Pamianthe cardenasii) (Peruvian Daffodil) – Peru, Bolivia (Cochabamba)

Formerly included

see Leptochiton

- Pamianthe andreana - Leptochiton quitoensis
- Pamianthe quitoensis - Leptochiton quitoensis

== Conservation ==
Pamianthe peruviana is believed to be extinct in the wild. Pamianthe parviflora is classified as vulnerable (VU).

== Ecology ==
=== Pollination ===
The flowers may possibly be moth-pollinated.
