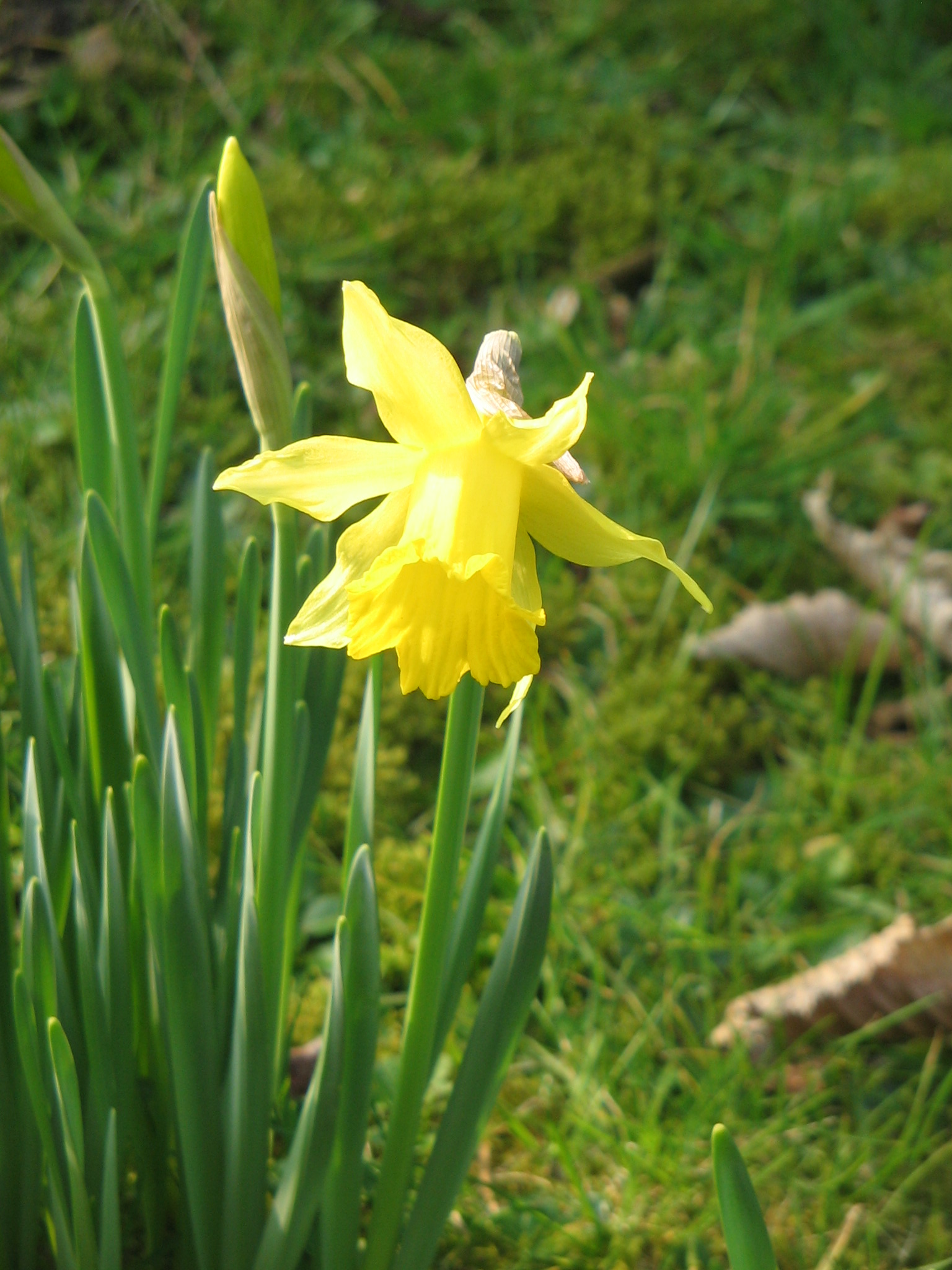

Scientific classification
- Kingdom: Plantae
- Clade: Tracheophytes
- Clade: Angiosperms
- Clade: Monocots
- Order: Asparagales
- Family: Amaryllidaceae
- Subfamily: Amaryllidoideae
- Genus: Narcissus
- Species: N. hispanicus

Binomial name
- Narcissus hispanicus Gouan
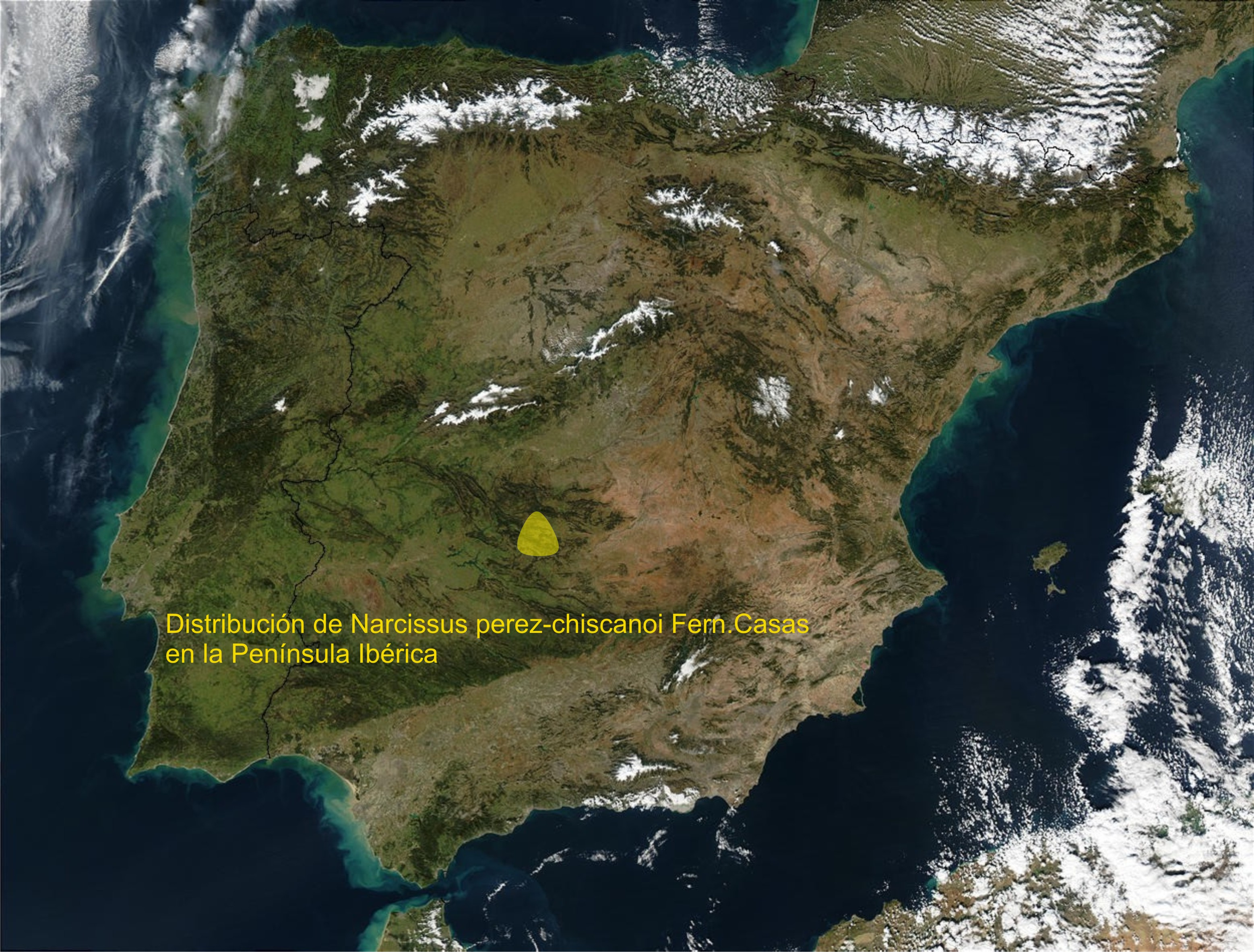
- Distribution range

Synonyms
- Ajax hispanicus (Gouan) M. Roem.; Moskerion hispanicum (Gouan) Raf.

= Narcissus hispanicus =

Species of daffodil

Narcissus hispanicus, the Spanish daffodil, or great daffodil, is a plant species native to France, Spain and Portugal. It is naturalized in the United Kingdom and cultivated elsewhere.

Also considered as a subspecies of Narcissus pseudonarcissus (N. pseudonarcissus subsp. major)

== Bibliography ==
- Zonneveld, B.J.M. (8 July 2010). "The involvement of Narcissus hispanicus Gouan in the origin of Narcissus bujei and of cultivated trumpet daffodils (Amaryllidaceae)". Anales del Jardín Botánico de Madrid. 67 (1): 29–39. Bibcode:2010AJBM...67...29Z. doi:10.3989/ajbm.2219.
