= Apennine deciduous montane forests =

Ecoregion in Italy

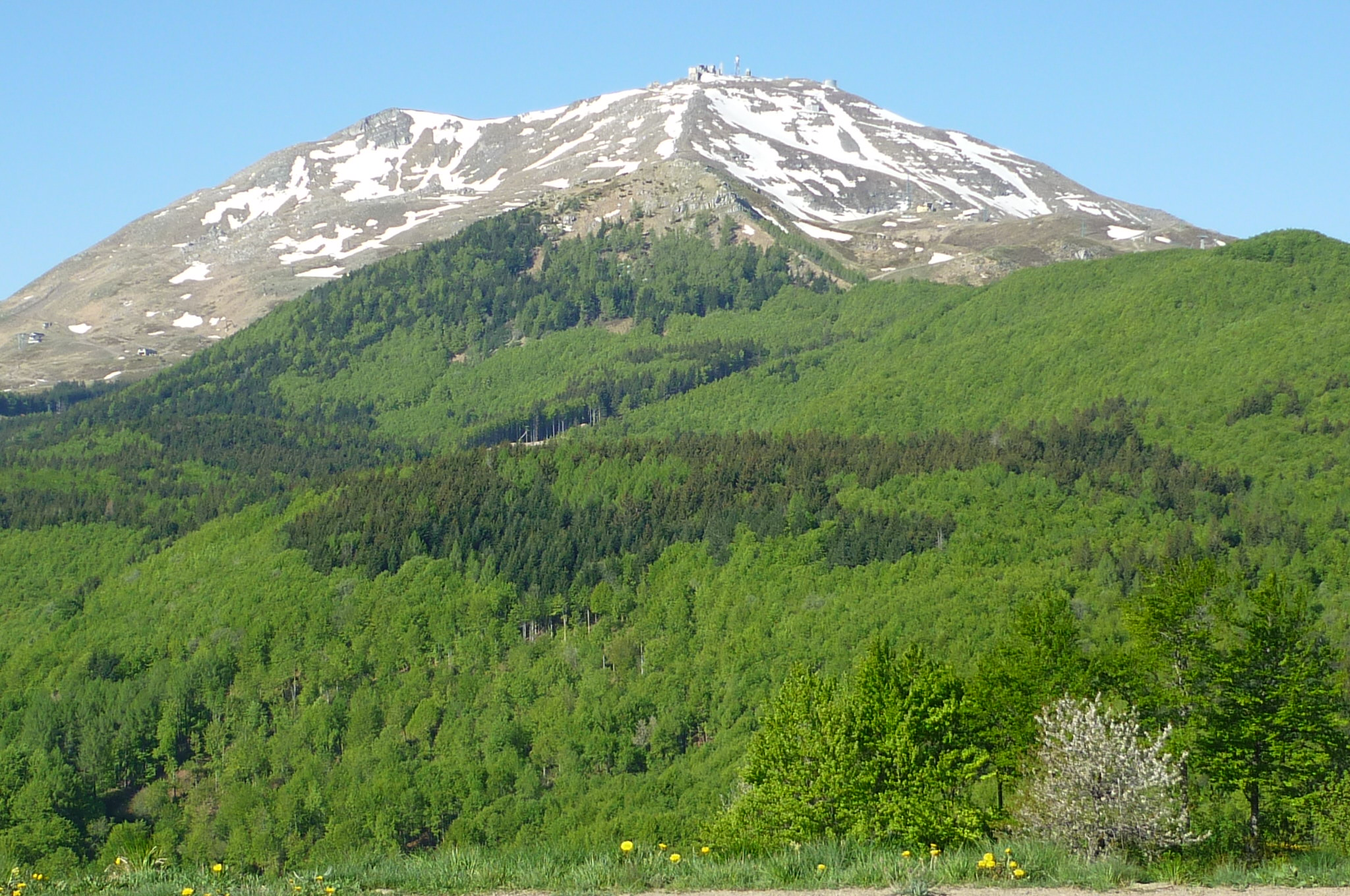
- Mixed forest (Abies alba and Fagus sylvatica) in Cimone Mountain, northern Apennines

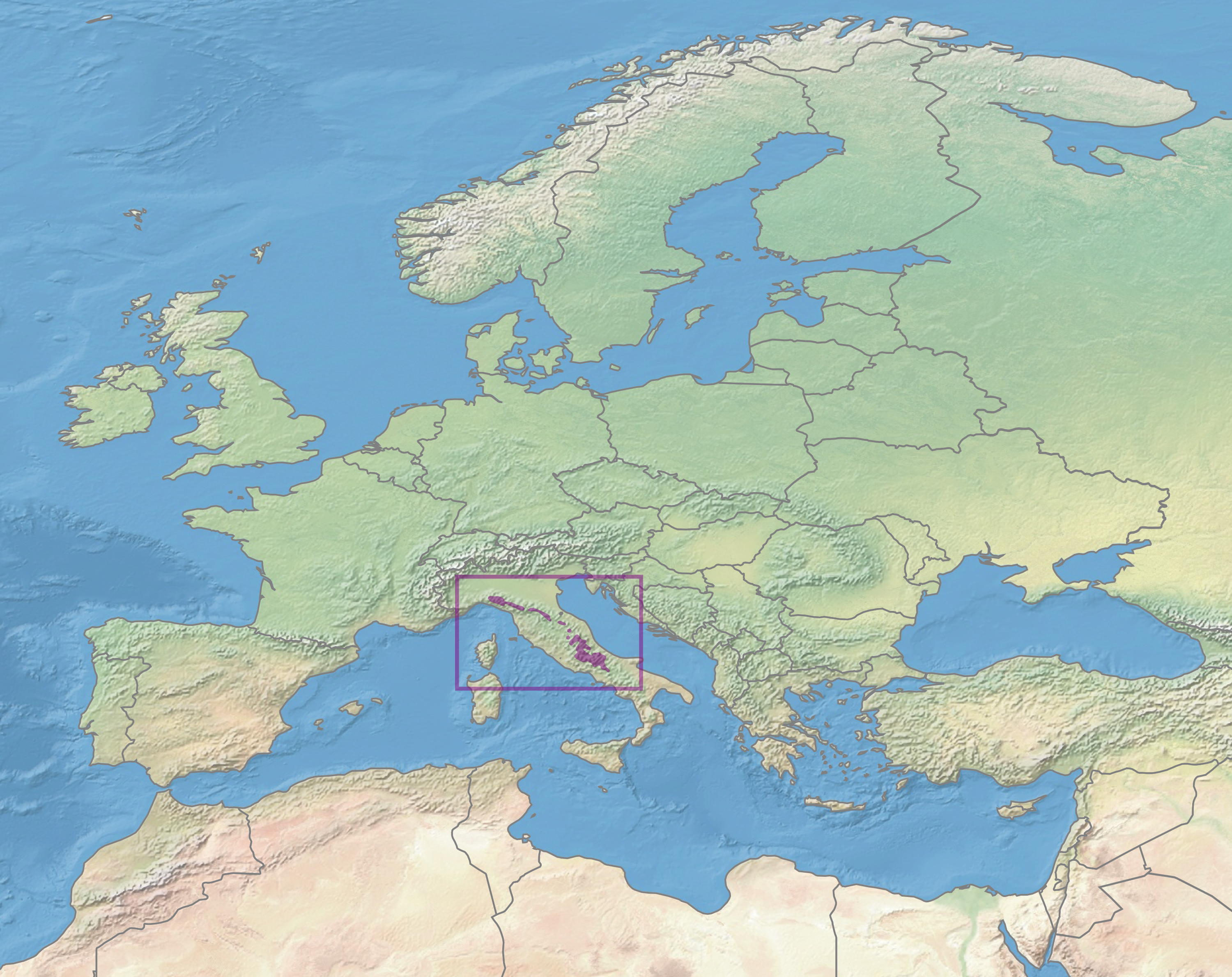
- Location of the Apennine deciduous montane forests

Ecology
- Realm: Palearctic
- Biome: temperate broadleaf and mixed forests
- Borders: Italian sclerophyllous and semi-deciduous forests

Geography
- Area: 16,147 km^{2} (6,234 mi^{2})
- Country: Italy

Conservation
- Conservation status: Critical/endangered
- Global 200: European-Mediterranean montane mixed forest
- Protected: 7,403 km^{2} (46%)

The Apennine deciduous montane forests are a temperate broadleaf and mixed forests ecoregion in the Apennine Mountains of Italy. The development of these forests is ensured by the high rainfall in the Apennines (from 1000 mm in the southern mountains to 2500 mm in the north), combined with a temperate-cool climate. Because of climate change, the presence of silver fir (Abies alba), although still widespread, has been dramatically reduced in favour of beech.

== Flora ==
The ecoregion has two major vegetation zones, montane forests and mountain meadows.

The beech forests are characterized by European beech Fagus sylvatica. Beech often grows with deciduous oaks (Quercus spp.) maples (Acer pseudoplatanus, Acer opalus ssp. obtusatum, and A. lobelii), Aria edulis, A. torminalis, Sorbus aucuparia, Ulmus glabra, Tilia platyphyllos, Populus tremula, Ilex aquifolium, and the evergreen conifer yew (Taxus baccata).

There are also mixed stands of beech and silver fir (Abies alba), along with relict stands of Italian black pine (Pinus nigra var. italica) and relict stands of Picea abies and Pinus sylvestris in the northern Apennines.

The mountain summits are covered with alpine meadows and woody cushion shrublands. Cushion shrubs include alpine juniper (Juniperus communis subsp. nana), Aria chamaemespilus, Arctostaphylos uva-ursi, Vaccinium vitis-idaea, and relict Pinus mugo on Maiella mountain. Alpine meadow plants include Gentiana dinarica, Gentiana nivalis, Androsace alpina, Polygala chamaebuxus, Saxifraga oppositifolia, Ranunculus seguieri, and Carlina acaulis.

The ecoregion has a high number of plant species. The Abruzzo Mountains have 1,200 species, Gran Sasso and Monti della Laga have 1,500 species, and the Maiella Mountains have 1,800 species. Endemic species represent between 10 and 20% of the total number of species, increasing at higher elevations. Endemic species include Androsace mathildae, Ranunculus magellensis, Aquilegia magellensis, and Soldanella minima samnitica.

== Fauna ==
The endangered Marsican brown bear (Ursus arctos arctos) is endemic to the ecoregion, surviving in the Abruzzo, Lazio and Molise National Park and neighboring reserves. Other native mammals include the Italian wolf (Canis lupus italicus), roe deer (Capreolus capreolus), the Apennine endemic Abruzzo chamois (Rupicapra pyrenaica ornata), forest cat (Felis silvestris), pine marten (Martes martes), beech marten (Martes foina), and Eurasian otter (Lutra lutra).

The ecoregion is home to several endemic and limited-range amphibians, including the northern spectacled salamander, (Salamandrina perspicillata) Italian newt (Lissotriton italicus, Italian stream frog (Rana italica), and Italian fire salamander (Salamandra salamandra ssp. gigliolii).

== Protected areas ==
A 2017 assessment found that 7,403 km^{2}, or 46%, of the ecoregion is in protected areas. About 55% of the unprotected area is still forested. Protected areas include Monte Cimone, Appennino Tosco-Emiliano National Park, Foreste Casentinesi, Monte Falterona, Campigna National Park, Gran Sasso e Monti della Laga National Park, Abruzzo, Lazio, and Molise National Park, Sirente-Velino Regional Park, and Matese Regional Park.
