= Tyrrhenian–Adriatic sclerophyllous and mixed forests =

Ecoregion in Southern Europe

Tyrrhenian-Adriatic sclerophyllous and mixed forests
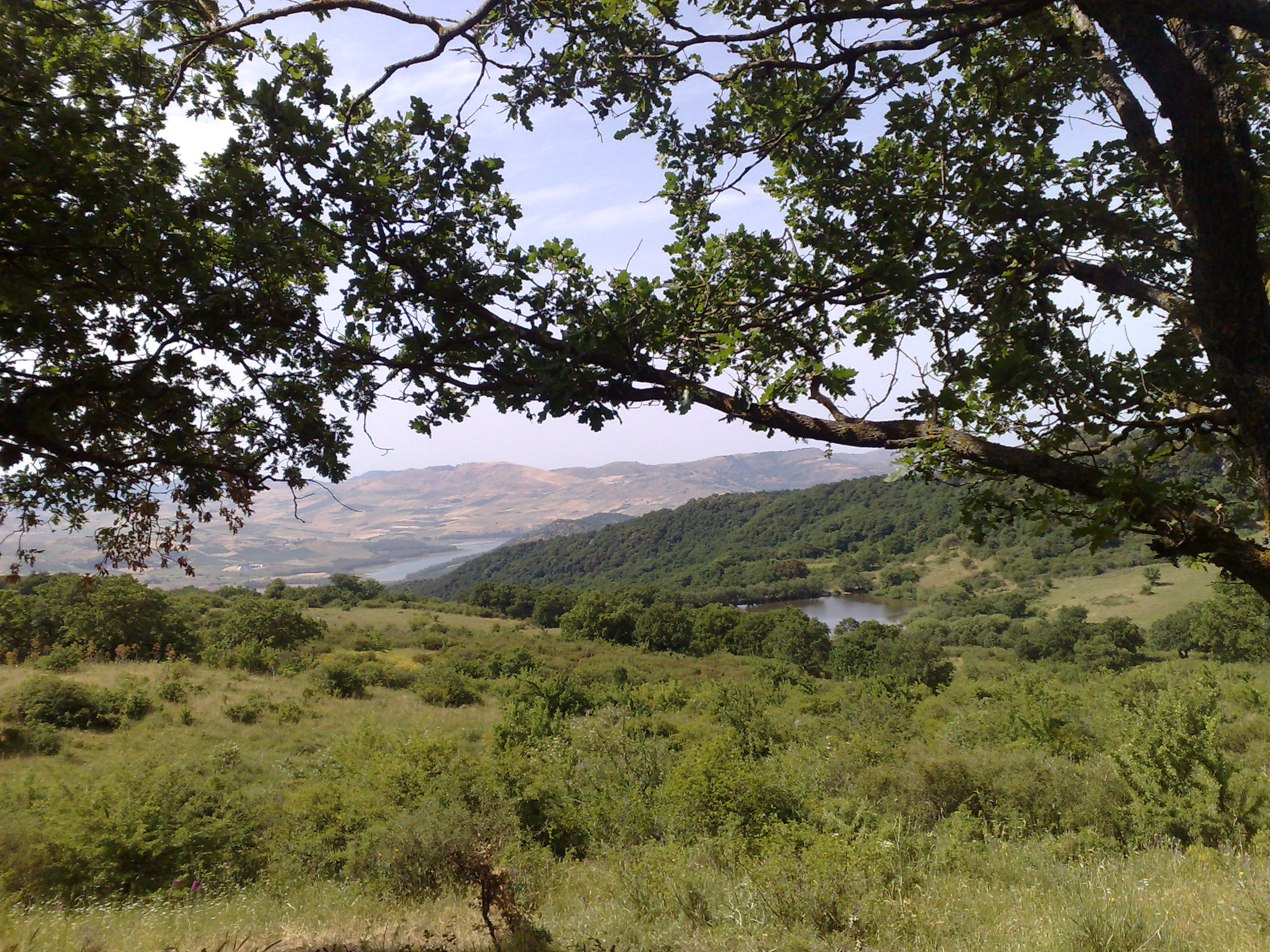
- Ficuzza Reserve, Sicily

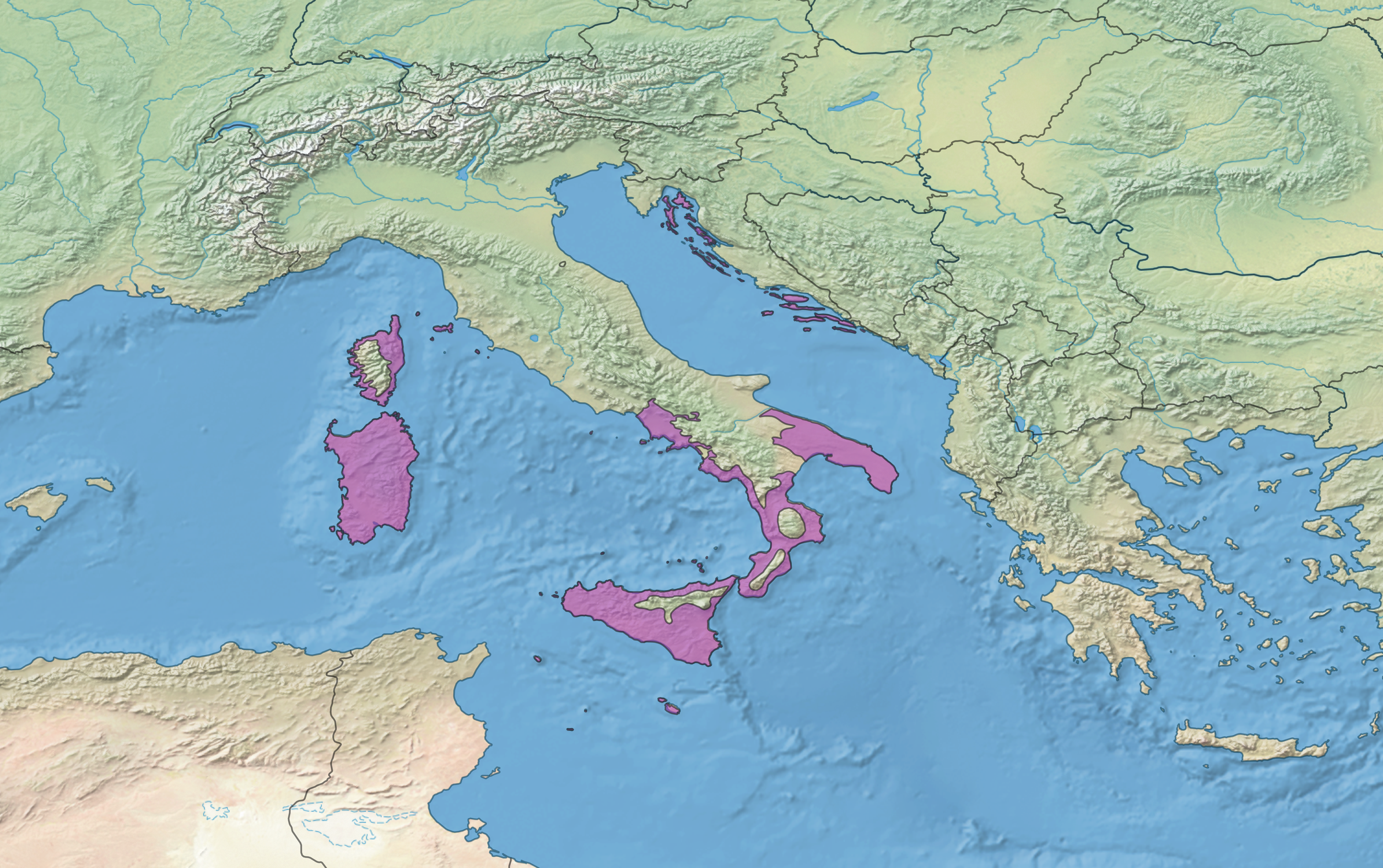
- Map of the Tyrrhenian-Adriatic Sclerophyllous and Mixed Forests Ecoregion

Ecology
- Realm: Palearctic
- Biome: Mediterranean forests, woodlands, and scrub
- Borders: Corsican montane broadleaf and mixed forests; Illyrian deciduous forests; Italian sclerophyllous and semi-deciduous forests; South Apennine mixed montane forests

Geography
- Area: 80,279 km^{2} (30,996 sq mi)
- Countries: Italy; France (Corsica); Croatia; Malta

Conservation
- Conservation status: critical/endangered
- Protected: 16,489 km^{2} (21%)

The Tyrrhenian-Adriatic sclerophyllous and mixed forests is an ecoregion in southern Italy, Sicily, Sardinia, Corsica, the Dalmatian Islands and Pelješac peninsula of Croatia, and Malta.

The ecoregion has a Mediterranean climate, and is in the Mediterranean forests, woodlands, and scrub biome.

== Flora ==
The Tyrrhenian-Adriatic sclerophyllous and mixed forests has six major plant communities.

- The Tyrrhenian mixed oak forests are dominated by the sclerophyllous evergreen oak Quercus ilex, Quercus suber and Quercus coccifera, and by deciduous species such as Quercus pubescens, Quercus cerris, Fraxinus ornus, Celtis australis, and Ostrya carpinifolia. The understory of the forest is dominated by maquis shrubs. Quercus ichnusae is a species of oak endemic to Sardinia, where it grows in hill and mountain woodlands with other deciduous oaks.
- Shrublands occur across the ecoregion. The dominant species of maquis shrubland are Olea europaea, Ceratonia siliqua, Laurus nobilis, Arbutus unedo, Pistacia terebinthus, Pistacia lentiscus, Myrtus communis, Erica arborea and Nerium oleander. Juniperus phoenicea, Erica scoparia and Chamaerops humilis grow near the Tyrrhenian, Arbutus andrachne, Juniperus oxycedrus and Juniperus macrocarpa grow in Dalmatia. These trees and shrubs often occur in the undestory of evergreen sclerophyllous and pine forests. Low shrubland known as garrigue grows on dry, south facing slopes near the coast.
- Some surviving temperate deciduous oak woodlands, mainly of Quercus robur, appear in coastal wetlands on the Italian peninsula and on the island of Corsica. Stone pine Pinus pinea is found on some coastal sand dunes, maritime pine (Pinus pinaster) grows on higher elevations on the island of Corsica and Sardinia.
- Berber thuja woodlands occur on the island of Malta and are one of the only populations of Tetraclinis in Europe.
- The Southeastern Italian woodlands, in the region of Apulia, contain the oak species Quercus trojana and Quercus macrolepis, endemic to the Eastern Mediterranean, together with the evergreen holm oak Quercus ilex, kermes oak Quercus coccifera, cork oak Quercus suber, olive Olea europaea, carob Ceratonia siliqua and the deciduous oak Quercus pubescens. The Aleppo pine Pinus halepensis is also found in these woodlands.
- The Islands of Dalmatia are dominated by Aleppo pine Pinus halepensis, kermes oak Quercus coccifera and holm oak Quercus ilex with maquis shrubs and deciduous trees Quercus pubescens, Quercus cerris, Carpinus orientalis, Fraxinus ornus, Cotinus coggygria, Paliurus spina-christi, Cercis siliquastrum. The Dalmatian black pine (Pinus nigra subsp. dalmatica), a relict and endemic subspecies of pine, is native to the southern Dalmatian islands of Brač, Hvar, and Korčula and the Pelješac peninsula, from 400 to 700 metres elevation. These black pine populations are severely fragmented, with a continuing decline of mature trees, due mostly to habitat degradation by feral goats. The islands are home to several endemic species, including species of Centaurea. The Dalmatian cranesbill (Geranium dalmaticum) is endemic to the Pelješac peninsula.

== Fauna ==
Two subspecies of large mammal herbivore, the European mouflon (Ovis aries musimon) and Corsican red deer (Cervus elaphus corsicanus), are endemic to Corsica and Sardinia.

Marmora's warbler (Curruca sarda) breeds in low scrubland in Corsica and Sardinia, including Cistus garrigue and low to medium-height maquis of tree-heath (Erica arborea), strawberry tree (Arbutus unedo) and Pistacia lentiscus, from March to July. The species winters across the Mediterranean in Tunisia, Libya, and Algeria.

== Protected areas ==
16,489 km^{2} (21%) of the ecoregion is in protected areas.
