= Italian sclerophyllous and semi-deciduous forests =

Ecoregion in Italy

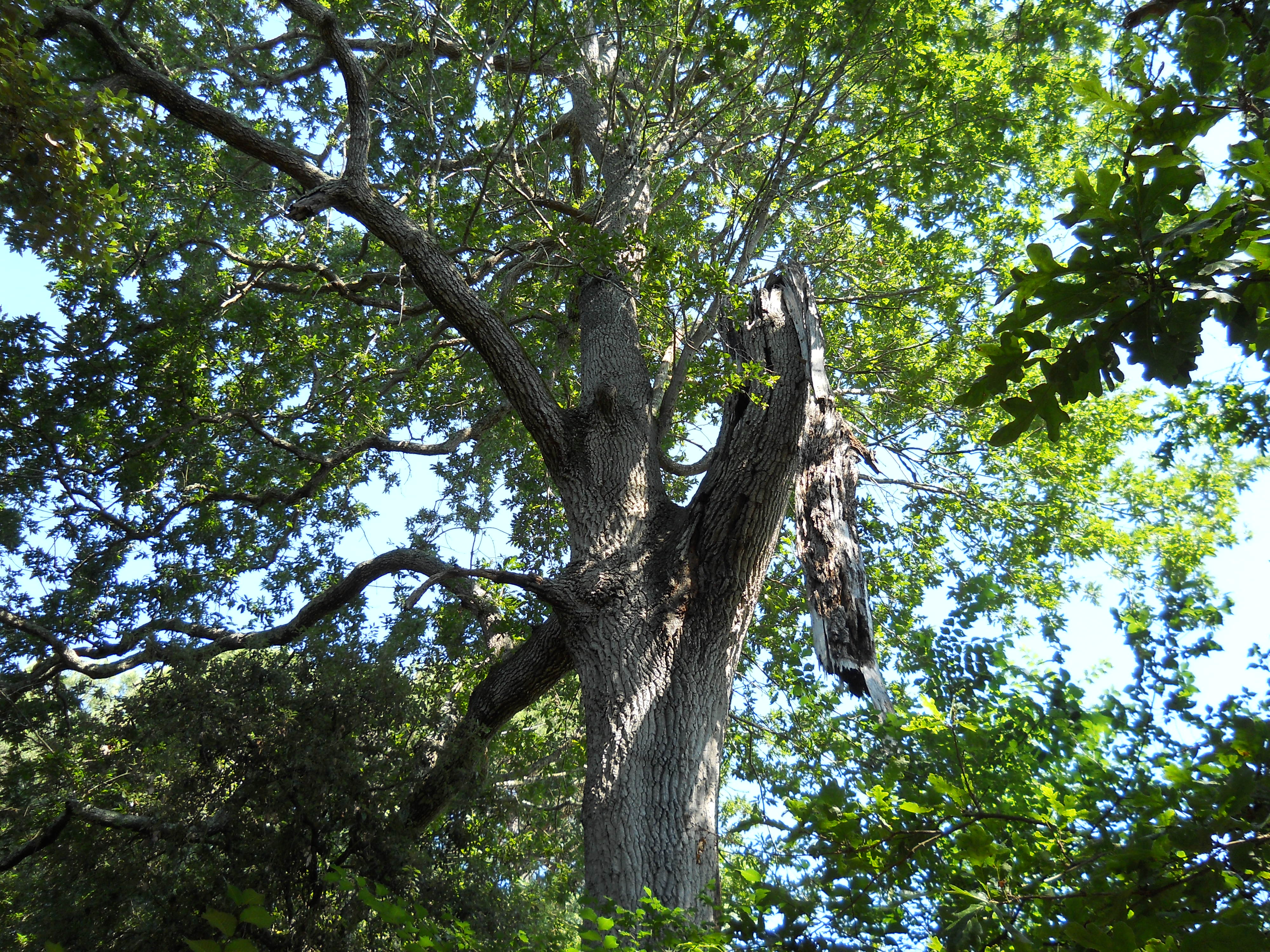
- Migliarino, San Rossore, and Massaciuccoli Natural Park, Tuscany

- Map of the ecoregion

Ecology
- Realm: Palearctic
- Biome: Mediterranean forests, woodlands, and scrub
- Borders: List: Alps conifer and mixed forests; Apennine deciduous montane forests; Northeast Spain and Southern France Mediterranean forests; Po Basin mixed forests; South Apennine mixed montane forests; Tyrrhenian-Adriatic sclerophyllous and mixed forests

Geography
- Area: 101,052 km^{2} (39,016 mi^{2})
- Countries: List: Italy; France; Monaco; San Marino; Vatican City

Conservation
- Conservation status: Critical/endangered
- Protected: 18,302 km² (18%)

The Italian sclerophyllous and deciduous forests ecoregion, part of the Mediterranean forests, woodlands, and scrub biome, is in Italy. The ecoregion covers most of the Italian Peninsula and includes both evergreen and deciduous forests.

== Geography ==
The ecoregion extends from the southern Po Basin in northern Italy to the southern Apennine Mountains of Basilicata and Calabria. It covers the lowlands of central Italy, including the valleys of the Arno and Tiber rivers, the Tyrrhenian Sea (western) coast of central Italy and Liguria, extending into southeastern France, and central Italy's Adriatic coast, as well as the middle elevations of the Apennines.

The Apennines' higher-elevation montane forests are considered separate ecoregions – the Apennine deciduous montane forests in central Italy and the South Apennine mixed montane forests in southern Italy. The coastal lowlands and foothills of Campania, Calabria, and Apulia in southern Italy are part of the Tyrrhenian-Adriatic sclerophyllous and mixed forests ecoregion.

Rock types are limestone, dolomite, marl, schist-marl, and sandstone.

Cities in the ecoregion include Rome, Florence, Genoa, and Nice.

== Flora ==
The forests vary in species composition with elevation and soils.

Lower elevation forests are dominated by sclerophyllous evergreen oaks, including holm oak (Quercus ilex), often on limestone-derived soils, and cork oak (Quercus suber), often on soils derived from volcanic rocks. They are accompanied by deciduous trees and conifers such as: downy oak (Quercus pubescens), flowering ash (Fraxinus ornus), hop-hornbeam (Ostrya carpinifolia), nettle tree (Celtis australis), Montpellier maple (Acer monspessulanum), Oriental hornbeam (Carpinus orientalis), Mediterranean pines (Pinus pinaster, Pinus pinea, Pinus halepensis), and hawthorn (Crataegus monogyna).

At middle elevations, forests are predominantly deciduous oaks (Quercus cerris, Quercus pubescens, and Quercus frainetto) with sweet chestnut (Castanea sativa) and hop-hornbeam.

In the highest portions of the Apennines, the sclerophyllous and semi-deciduous forests transition to the Apennine deciduous montane forests and South Apennine mixed montane forests, which are dominated by deciduous European beech (Fagus sylvatica), together with other deciduous broadleaf trees sycamore maple (Acer pseudoplatanus), Italian maple (Acer opalus subsp. obtusatum), and the strict endemic Lobel's maple (Acer lobelii), as well as whitebeam (Aria edulis), rowan (Sorbus aucuparia), chequer tree (Aria torminalis), whych elm (Ulmus glabra), broadleaf lime (Tilia platyphyllos), aspen (Populus tremula), holly (Ilex aquifolium) and the conifers yew (Taxus baccata) and Silver fir (Abies alba).

The ecoregion is home to thousands of plant species, with over 2000 on the Gargano Peninsula alone. Endemic species are from 10 to 20% of the total, and occur from sea level up to the high mountains. The ecoregion's orchids are diverse, particularly in the mountains; the Maiella Mountains have 60 known species, and the Gargano Mountains have 56 species.

== Conservation and threats ==
Much of the ecoregion is still forested. There are areas of old-growth forest in relatively inaccessible mountains, and larger areas of coppice woodlands, many of which are no longer harvested and are regenerating naturally. Grazing and timber harvesting has altered the forest structure and species composition across much of the ecoregion.

Population is concentrated in cities, valleys, and along the coast, and much of the countryside is thinly populated. Many rural areas have been abandoned since World War II as Italy urbanized and industrialized.

== Protected areas ==
A 2017 assessment found that 18,302 km^{2}, or 18%, of the ecoregion is in protected areas. Protected areas include Gargano National Park, Alta Murgia National Park, Cinque Terre National Park, Capanne di Marcarolo Natural Park, and Bracciano-Martignano Regional Park.
