= Corsican montane broadleaf and mixed forests =

Ecoregion on the island of Corsica

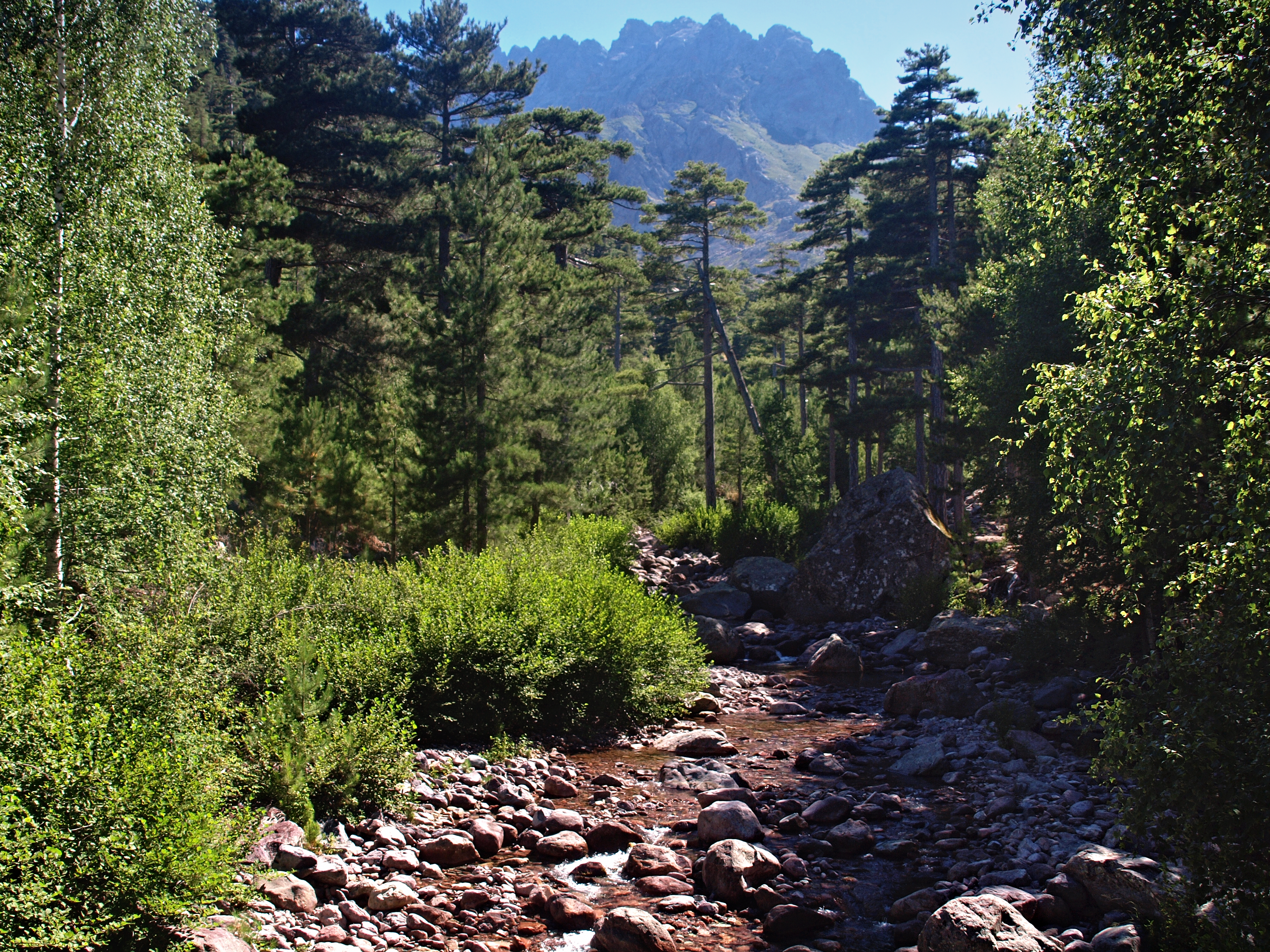
- Stranciacone stream near Asco, Haute-Corse

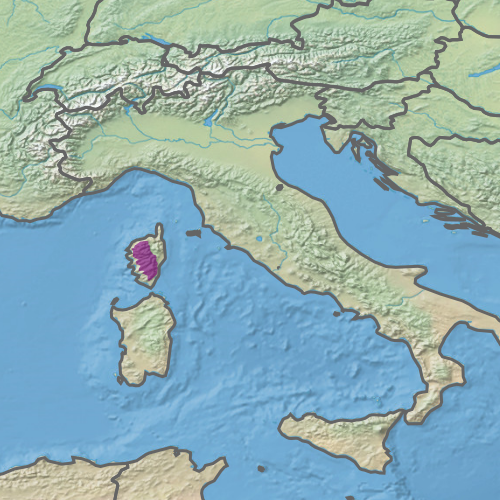
- Ecoregion territory (in purple)

Ecology
- Realm: Palearctic
- Biome: Mediterranean forests, woodlands, and scrub
- Borders: Tyrrhenian-Adriatic sclerophyllous and mixed forests

Geography
- Area: 3,634 km^{2} (1,403 mi^{2})
- Country: Corsica (France)

Conservation
- Conservation status: critical/endangered
- Protected: 2829 km² (78%)

The Corsican montane broadleaf and mixed forests ecoregion, in the Mediterranean forests, woodlands, and scrub biome, are on the island of Corsica. The ecoregion includes the high-elevation areas of Corsica's mountainous interior.

== Setting ==
The ecoregion covers an area of 3,600 square kilometers (1,400 sq mi), approximately 40% of the area of the island. The montane forests are surrounded at lower elevations by the Tyrrhenian-Adriatic sclerophyllous and mixed forests. The highest elevations in the ecoregion are Monte Cinto (2,710 m) and Monte Rotondo (2,625 m).

== Flora ==
The ecoregion is home to several distinct forest communities, which vary with elevation and exposure.

Lower elevations are occupied by forests of evergreen sclerophyll oaks, including holm oak (Quercus ilex) and cork oak (Quercus suber).

Middle elevations are predominantly forests of maritime pine (Pinus pinaster) interspersed with forests of mixed broadleaf deciduous trees, including downy oak (Quercus pubescens), sessile oak (Quercus petraea), English oak (Quercus robur), European hop-hornbeam (Ostrya carpinifolia), Italian alder (Alnus cordata) and sweet chestnut (Castanea sativa).

At the higher elevations, forests of Corsican pine (Pinus nigra subsp. salzmannii var. corsicana) predominate on the warmer south-facing slopes, while silver fir (Abies alba) and European beech (Fagus sylvatica) predominate on the cooler north-facing slopes. The highest elevations are subalpine shrublands, with green alder (Alnus viridis), juniper (Juniperus communis subsp. alpina), sycamore maple (Acer pseudoplatanus), and stands of silver birch (Betula pendula).

== Protected areas ==
2829 km^{2} (78%) of the ecoregion's area is protected, mostly in the Regional Natural Park of Corsica.
