= Austrian Resin Extraction =

Pecherei is the common expression in southern Lower Austria for the practice of resin extraction from black pine trees and other evergreens. This profession centers around the extraction of tree resin, also known as "pitch," that will ultimately be used in the production of further chemical products. Those who extract resin for a living are described as Pecher or "resin workers." In the year 2011, Pecherei was incorporated into the register of Intangible Cultural Heritage in Austria, which was drafted in the context of the UNESCO Convention for the Preservation of Intangible Culture.

The most important tree for use in resin extraction is the black pine (Pinus nigra), which has the greatest resin content of all of the European coniferous trees, and it was even used as early as by the Romans for this very purpose. These trees are generally best tapped for their resin between the ages of 90 and 120 years old. In Lower Austria, the Austrian black pine is the predominant tree, and its resin is of particularly high-quality, thereby making the Austrian pitch one of the best in the world.

== History ==
In the southern part of Lower Austria, most prominently in the Industrial Quarter and the Vienna Woods, Pecherei became an established practice probably as early as the 17th century. From the beginning of the 18th century, lords of local manors began to promote pitch extraction, which led to the emergence of Pitch Huts for resin processing. In fact, at this time, Pecherei and the trading business surrounding it became an important source of income for some members of the population.

In the early decades of the 19th century, resin extraction experienced its first heyday, as an increase in demand led to increasing prices and production. However, throughout the 1960s, the industry gradually came to a standstill. The main reason for this was that cheaper, comparable products were being imported from eastern-bloc countries (communist countries during the cold war) as well as from Turkey, Greece, and Portugal. Also, around this time there were numerous advances in technical chemistry that made resin less necessary for numerous products.

Austrian Social Security Law still recognizes the Pecherei profession in the context of independent practitioners. This profession is defined as follows:

"Self-employed Resin Workers are people who, without being employed on the basis of a service or apprenticeship relationship, pursue a seasonally recurring, monetarily gainful activity by extracting resin products in forests outside their home area, provided that they usually pursue this gainful activity without the help of non-family workers."

== Raw Materials and Processing ==
The raw resin is light yellow in color. It is rich in organic hydrocarbons, but it has a low oxygen content and is nitrogen-free. Additionally, raw resin is largely a mix of terpene-derived substances, with many having acidic properties. The resin owes its spicy, aromatic smell to the abundant essential oils it contains.

The resin flow within a tree differs based on the time of year and the weather, with warmth and humidity having beneficial effects. Between 3 and 4 kilograms of Pitch could be obtained from a single trunk in one year. So, in order for a Resin Worker to live modestly with his family, he had to extract resin from about 3000 trees. The workdays usually began before sunrise with the commute to the work area in the pine forest, and Resin Workers would often work 10 to 12 hours.

The tree resin was melted from the raw resin balm in special huts through a distillation process, the so-called the "Boiling Pitch". During this process, the impurities were first skimmed off or sieved before the oil and water were evaporated and collected in a collection container. The lighter turpentine oil floated to the top of the mixture during this process, and it was poured out. The "Boiling Pitch," now freed from water and Turpentine oils, became a dark yellow, hard and brittle mass after cooling—this is known as: "Rosin."

This collected Terpentine Oil and the Rosin were primarily used in the paper, varnish, soap, wire, and shoe-polish industries.

== Seasonal Work and Working Methods ==
The work of a Resin Worker varied based on the season. The most important work in the winter was the preparation of equipment, especially the making of pitch notches via the use of a special tool called a "Notch Planar." Pitch notches were wooden planks, which were inserted against the tree after bark removal (between the bare trunk and the remaining bark on the edges) to help direct resin flow. The most complex work took place in the spring, when the actual resin collection was done, and different methods were used.

=== Pitch Container Variations and General Collection Methods ===
"Grandl" or "Scrap" Method

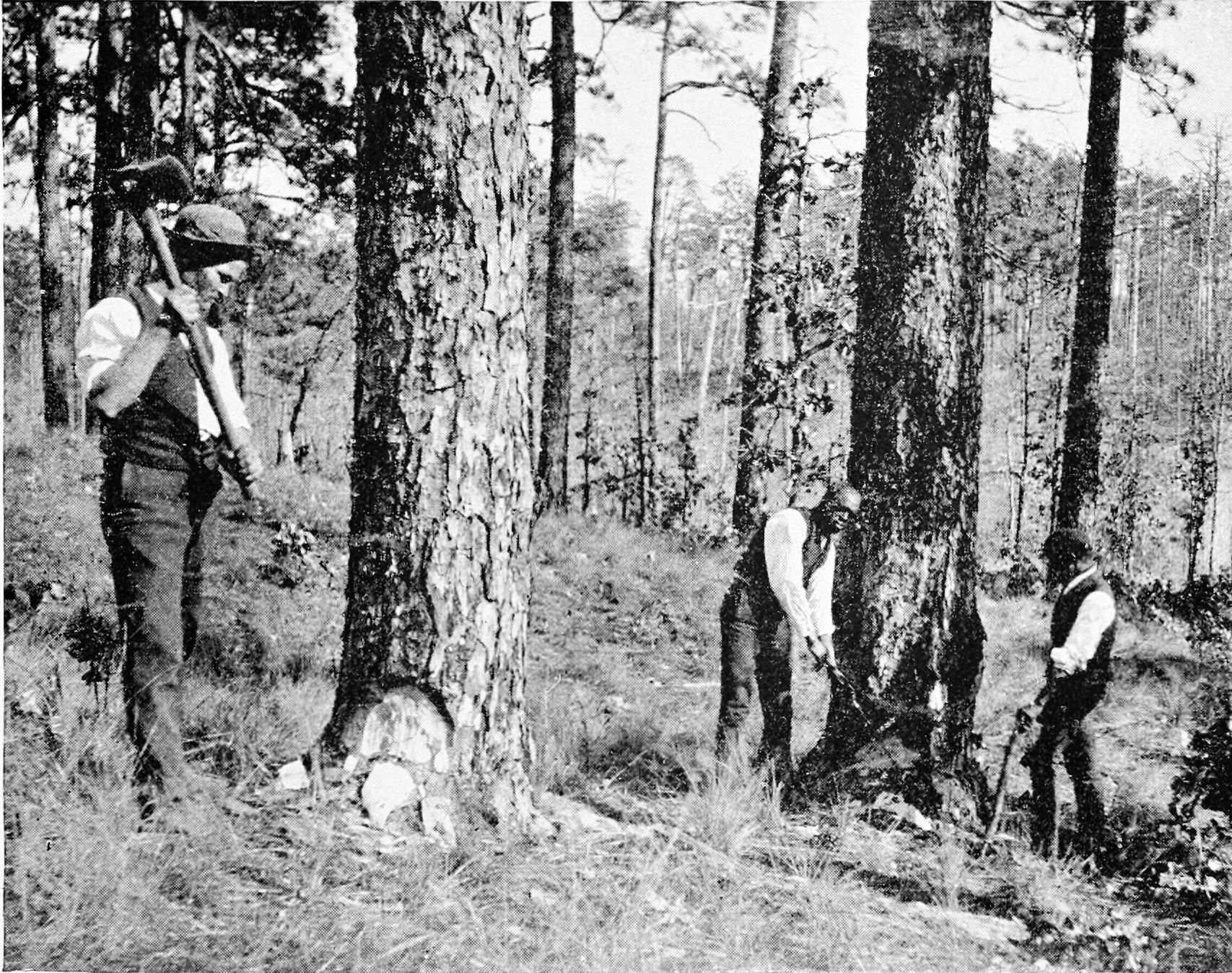
A tree being worked in the early stages of what could be described as a process similar to the Scrap method. Note the opening at the bottom of the tree, digging into the trunk.

In the earliest method of resin extraction, the resin was collected near the base of the trunk in simple earthen pits smeared with clay. Because this led to resin contamination, the "Grandl" or Scrap Method was eventually developed. When using this method, the Resin Worker would create a recess—which was called a "Scrap"—out of the wood near the ground with a hoe. This Scrap became the new site of resin collection. Since this new resin container had to be smooth and clean, the Scrap was smoothed with a narrower, rounded hoe (called the "moon" or "scrap" hoe). The resulting wood chips from this process were removed via the use of a pointed stick—referred to as the "Rowisch"—which at the same time served as a counting tool: after each new scrap was cut, the Resin Worker would carve an indentation into the stick so that the number of trees that had been extracted was always known.

With the "Adze," which later became the guild symbol of the Pecherei profession, and with a hoe, the Resin Worker subsequently removed the bark from the tree trunk. In order to be able to direct the resin flow into the resin-collection area (the Scrap), pitch notches had to be inserted across the trunk.

About three times every two weeks, from spring to early autumn, de-barking was the oldest working method. The Resin Worker removed the bark piece-by-piece with a special de-barking Adze down to the trunk so that the surface free from bark continued to grow and the resin flow remained upright.

Depending on its size, a Scrap could take up between 0.25 and 0.35 kg of pitch. A tree worked in this way could provide pitch for 12 to 18 years of resin extraction.

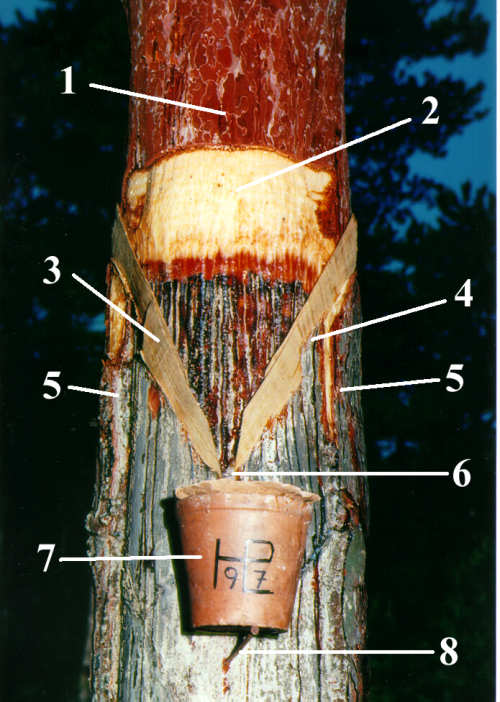
A tree treated according to the "Beer Mug" method. Note the wooden pitch notches inserted between the remaining bark and the de-barked region, in a V-shape. Also, note the trimmed bark below the mug. (Ignore the numbers).

The Beer Mug Method

In the inter-war period, the transition from the "Scrap" to the "Beer Mug" method began, in which pitch mugs were used for the resin collection. To do this, the bark of new pitch trees, called the "Heurigen", had to be trimmed from the ground up with a hoe. During this process, the bark was removed from about a third of the circumference of the trunk first with an axe and then with the Rintler (which is essentially a scraper) so that a V-shaped demarcation was created.

Then, the Resin Worker had to create an elongated recess on the sides of the tree trunk to accommodate the pitch notches, chopping and pulling them in. Just below the narrowest point, an opening was hacked out to hold the pitch-collecting mug; a pitch nail was hammered in just below it, and finally the collecting mug with its lid was put in. The tree was now ready for resin extraction and, as described above, had to be de-barked at regular intervals.

The trees that had been pitched for several years were processed in a similar way.

=== General Description of Bark Removal Methods ===
While the Scrap and Beer Mug methods were essentially the two approaches used in setting up a tree for resin extraction, some variation existed in terms of how the bark was removed and how the resin flow was managed. Some of these bark removal and resin flow methods are described below.

Adze-based Bark Removal (de-barking):

As mentioned in the collection methods described above, bark was originally removed via the use of an Adze or similar tools. This, however, was time-consuming and required much effort, as only small pieces of bark could be removed per hit with this device.

The Planing Method

Due to the strenuous nature of the Adze-based bark removal, the planing method was developed. Not only was it less strenuous; it also took less time.

The working method for new pitch trees as well as those that had been worked on for several years remained the same as described above, only planing was used instead of the usual, Adze-based, de-barking. With the plane (a tool for smoothing surfaces), the Resin Worker cut a wide, flat chunk from the trunk with a single cut. When de-barking in earlier methods, this could only be achieved with many hits from the Adze.

The Groove Method

As with all processing methods, the upper section of tree bark had to be removed beforehand for the grooving method. Then, the Resin Worker removed a layer of bark several millimeters thick with a scraper. A precise cut was important. With this planing process, no contiguous surfaces were created, but rather V-shaped grooves within the trunk itself. This saved the Resin Worker from inserting the pitch notches, as the resin could flow through the grooves into the pitch mug.

Although the Groove Method saved work and time by eliminating chopping, it was only used sporadically in southern Lower Austria, as the yield was up to 50% lower than that of the two other resin extraction approaches, namely adze-based de-barking and planing. A big problem with the grooving process was the clogging of the grooves with resin.

== Other Tools and Facilities ==
The ladder was an indispensable tool for working on trees that had been pitched for several years. It was made from two thin, long pine trees that served as stiles and tough dogwood for the rungs. A professional extractor climbed up to 22 rungs of the ladder, which corresponds to a height of 6 m, several hundred times a day, worked the trunk and then slid down with the leather slip patches attached to the thighs and knees.

According to old custom, a wooden Pecher hut was built in the middle of the forest. It resembled a wood chopper's hut and was mainly used for protection and refuge in bad weather. Inside there was usually a roughly timbered table and a bench. The Resin Worker ate here occasionally. Now and then, there was also a stove. The Pecher went home nearly every day; only in exceptional cases did he spend the night in the hut. A ladder area was set up so that the ladders needed to work on the trees of different heights did not always have to be taken home.
