= Panfilia Wood =

Forest near Ferrara, italy

Coordinates: 44°46′57″N 11°22′53″E

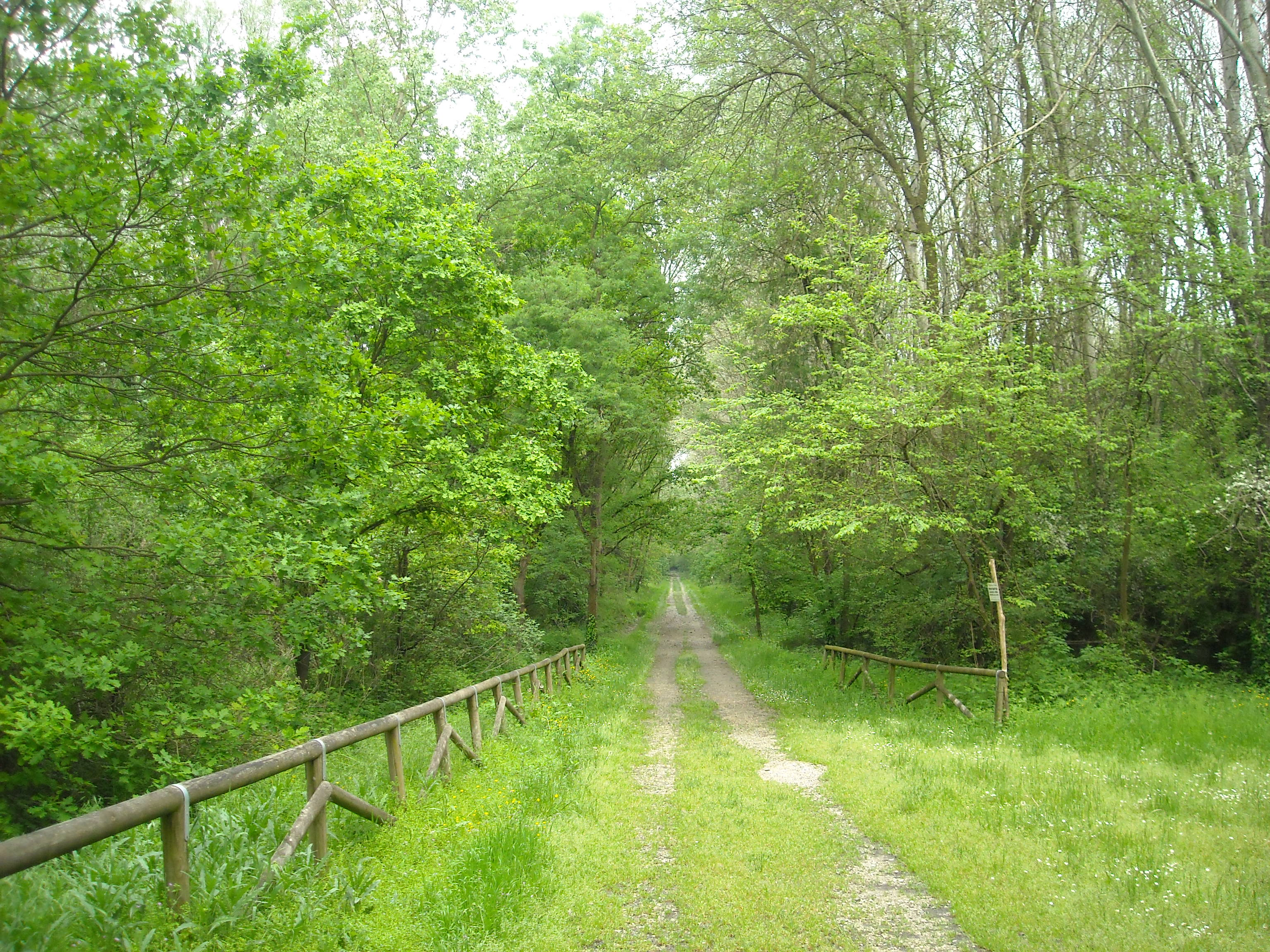
Trailhead in Panfilia Wood

Panfilia Wood (Italian: Bosco della Panfilia) is an 81-hectare (200-acre) forest in the municipality of Sant'Agostino in the comune of Terre del Reno, in the region of Emilia-Romagna, Italy. It is located along the northern edge of a bend of the river Reno. It is bounded to the west by the Cavo Napoleonico, a canal connecting the rivers Reno and Po, to the north by the township of Sant'Agostino, to the east by countryside and farms, and to the south by the Reno.

The wood is a relic tract of the Po Basin mixed forests, and the largest such relic in the region.

== History ==
In 1750, a seasonal flood of the Reno destroyed the villa and lands of Panfilo Fachinetti, a local marquis and landowner. The area became referred to as the rotta Panfilia, "Panfilo's break". The modern forest grew on the alluvial deposit left by the flood.

== Ecology ==
Panfilia Wood is partly flooded by the Reno when the river reaches its high water marks in spring and autumn. The dominant tree cover consists of pedunculate oak, narrow-leaved ash, and white poplar. Other tree species include elm, false acacia, field maple, black poplar, and black alder The understory layer includes blackthorn, hazel, common hawthorn, cornel, and privet. The herbaceous layer is comparatively low in diversity. It is dominated by pendulous sedge, and additionally includes false brome. Riparian environments consist primarily of white willow over bittersweet nightshade. False indigo-bush, an invasive plant, is also found in this area.

Several kinds of fungi occur, including white truffles.

The wood is home to diverse bird species. Nesting songbirds include wrens, great tits, European goldfinches, Eurasian chaffinches, Eurasian skylarks, Eurasian jays, common starlings, common blackbirds, common cuckoos, spotted flycatchers, Eurasian golden orioles, Eurasian wrynecks, Eurasian hoopoes, and woodpeckers. The shore of the Reno hosts waterbirds such as common kingfishers, black-crowned night-herons, purple herons, grey herons, mallards, Eurasian coots and great crested grebes. Birds of prey include the Eurasian sparrowhawk and the common buzzard.

Mammal fauna includes the European polecat. Reptile and amphibians of the wood include the European pond turtle and Italian crested newt. Native insects include the large copper and great capricorn beetle.
