= Assidat zgougou =

Tunisian dessert

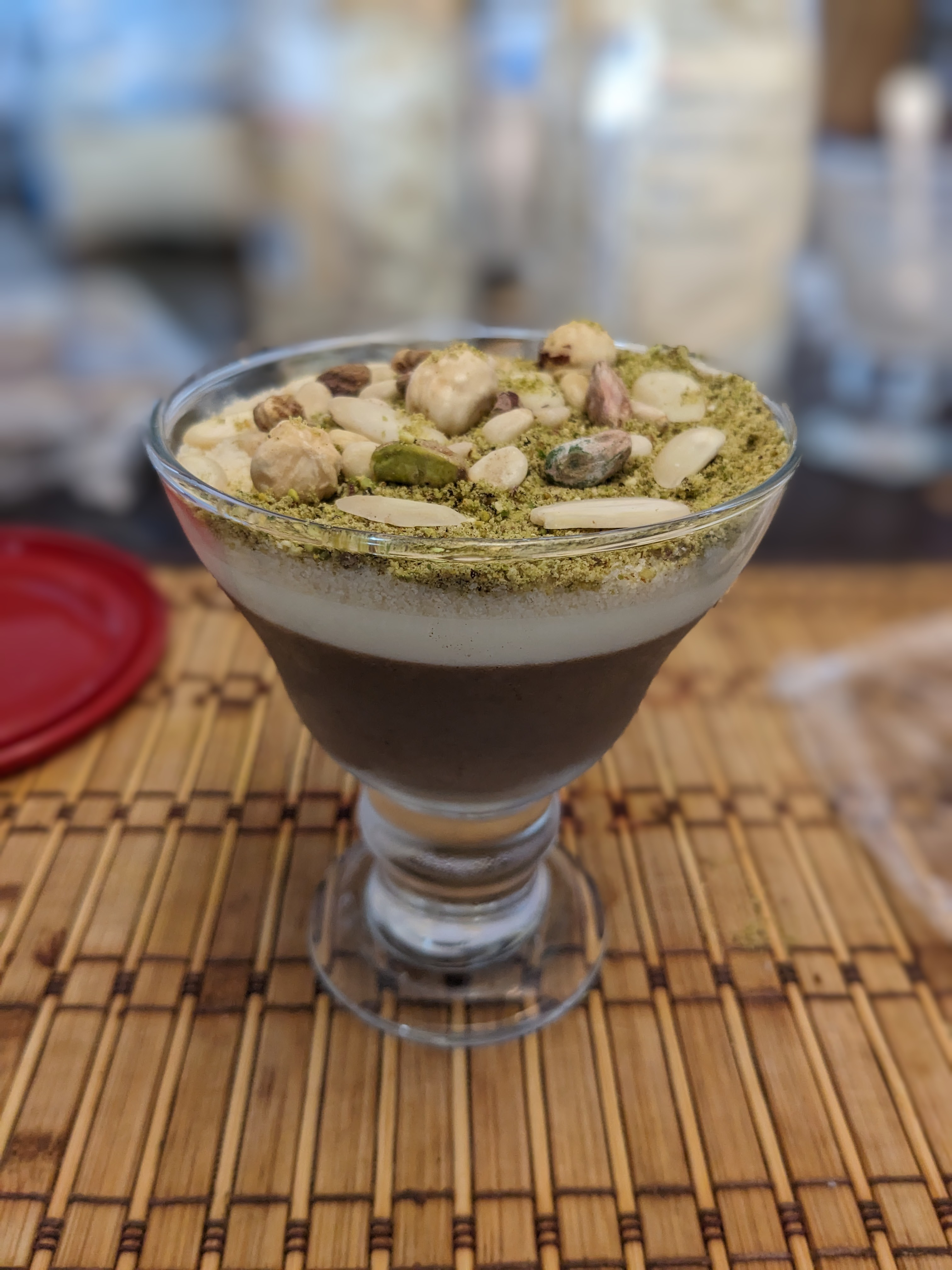
- An assidat zgougou cup
- Course: Dessert
- Place of origin: Tunisia
- Region or state: Tunisia
- Main ingredients: Grains of Aleppo pine

Assidat zgougou (Arabic: عصيدة الزقوقو, /ʕsˁiːdət (ɪ̈z)zɡuːɡuː/), literally Aleppo nut cream, is a Tunisian dessert often adorned with decorative patterns of pine nuts, pistachios and hazelnuts. It is prepared to celebrate the Mawlid and is made out of Aleppo pine powder, flour, milk, concentrated milk, and sugar.

== History ==
Assidat Zgougou was born out of the 1864-1867 famine in Tunisia. Northwest Tunisians found that they could turn Aleppo pine seeds into a nutritious flour. Originally seen as a humble dish, it eventually turned into a well-regarded and sophisticated dessert, key to Mawlid festivities in Tunisia.

== Preparation ==
The lower layer is made of the seeds of Aleppo pines, "zgougou", not to be confused with pine nuts of stone pines or Pinus armandii. The grains are cleaned, then ground in water, and sieved to very small sizes. The resulting juicy substance is then mixed with wheat flour and/or starch depending on the recipe. Sometimes concentrated milk is added. Then everything is cooked at low heat while stirred. Powdered sugar is added gradually as the mixture thickens, giving rise to a grayish-brown color.

The result is poured hot into a bowl and covered in a white custard made from milk, starch, sugar, eggs, and a bit of orange blossom essence, then decorated with nuts, whole or ground, and small candy like dragée.

It is also possible to make an assida (porridge/cream) out of other nuts instead of the Aleppo pine's grains, like hazelnuts, chestnuts or pistachios.

== Usage ==
Traditionally, Tunisians exchange bowls of assidat zgougou among neighbors and family members on the Mawlid, thus rendering decoration as important as the taste. Many use all sorts of seeds and nuts, ground or whole, to vary the forms and colors of the decoration.
