= Po Basin mixed forests =

Ecoregion in Italy

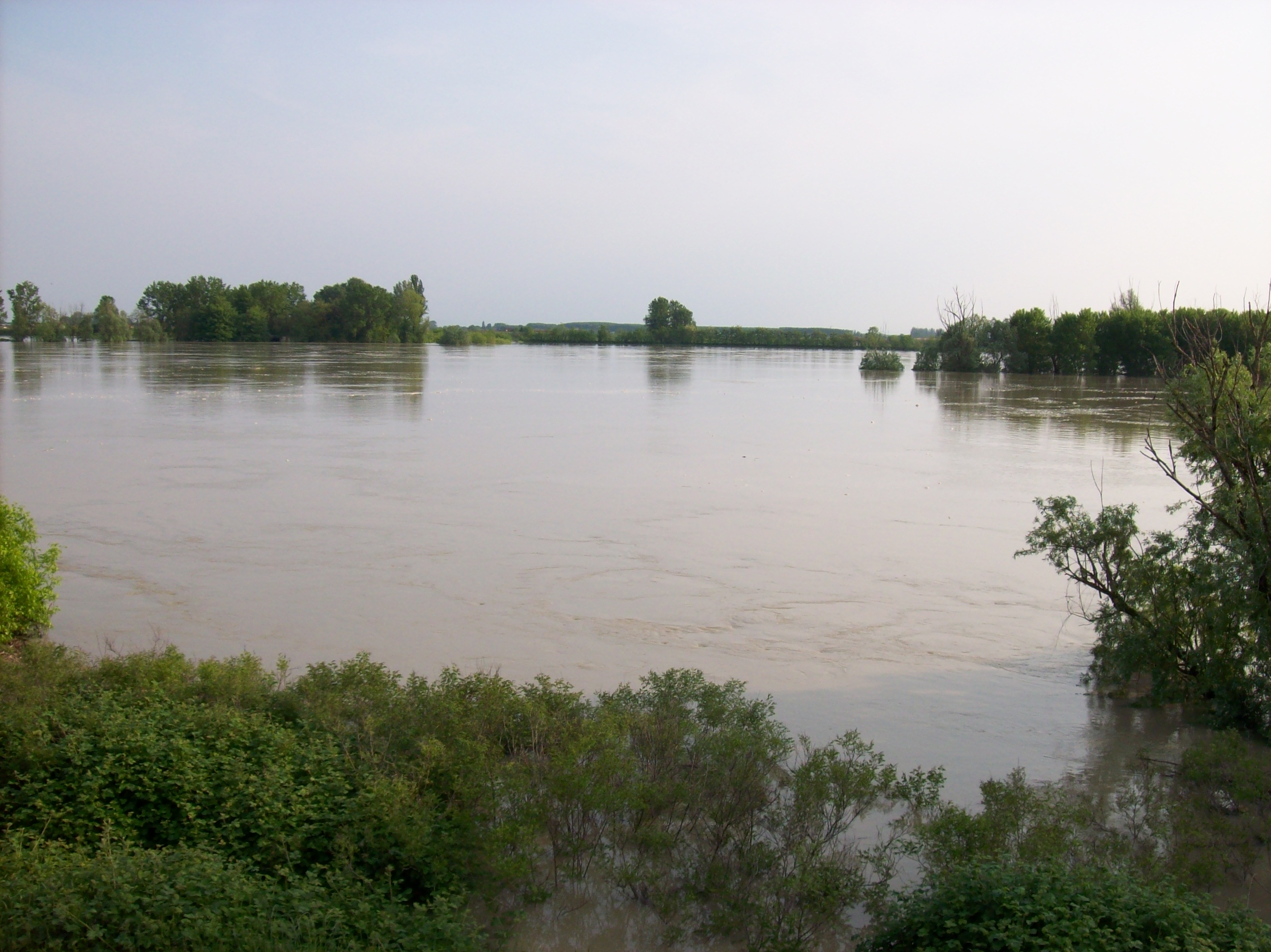
- Po River at San Benedetto

- Location of the Po Basin mixed forests

Ecology
- Realm: Palearctic
- Biome: Temperate broadleaf and mixed forests
- Borders: Alps conifer and mixed forests; Dinaric Mountains mixed forests; Illyrian deciduous forests, Italian sclerophyllous and semi-deciduous forests

Geography
- Area: 42,149 km^{2} (16,274 sq mi)
- Countries: Italy; Switzerland

Conservation
- Conservation status: Critical/endangered
- Protected: 3,572 km^{2} (8%)

The Po Basin mixed forests is a temperate broadleaf and mixed forests ecoregion in the basin of the Po River in northern Italy and Switzerland's Ticino canton.

== Geography ==
The Po Basin is bounded on the north and west by the Alps, and on the south by the Apennine Mountains. It opens onto the Adriatic Sea on the east.

== Flora ==
=== Terrestrial plants ===
The Po Basin mixed forests consists of remnants of:
1. Mixed deciduous oak/hornbeam forest -

- Quercus robur
- Quercus cerris
- Carpinus betulus
- Ulmus minor
- Fraxinus ornus

2. Riparian forest, as well as flood-plain vegetation of the Po Basin -

- Fraxinus oxycarpa
- Salix alba
- Alnus glutinosa
- Ulmus minor
- Populus alba
- Populus nigra
- Quercus robur

3. Coastal submediterranean forest -

- Quercus ilex
- Quercus cerris
- Olea europaea
- Pinus pinea
- Carpinus betulus
- Fraxinus ornus

=== Aquatic plants ===
The freshwater ecosystems (zona umida) have a high level of biodiversity.
Threatened (in Italy) plant species include

- Leucojum aestivum
- Halocnemum strobilaceum
- Nymphaea alba
- Bassia hirsuta
- Limonium bellidifolium
- Utricularia australis
- Thelypteris palustris
- Salvinia natans
- Sagittaria sagittifolia
- Plantago cornuti

== Fauna ==
Less-disturbed wetlands which are important breeding areas for many bird species are most significant biodiversity of the ecoregion. Examples are grey heron, purple heron, great egret, little egret, squacco heron, cattle egret, great bittern, little bittern, pygmy cormorant and ferruginous duck.

== Conservation ==
The region is industrialised and has a long history of human pressure (shrinkage of wetlands, invasive species, and unsustainable hunting of waterfowl).

=== Protected areas ===
A 2017 assessment found that 3,572 km^{2}, or 8%, of the ecoregion is in protected areas. Only 2% of the unprotected area remains in natural habitat. Protected areas include Panfilia Wood, the Euganean Hills Regional Park, Po Delta Regional Parks, and Valli del Mincio Nature Reserve.
