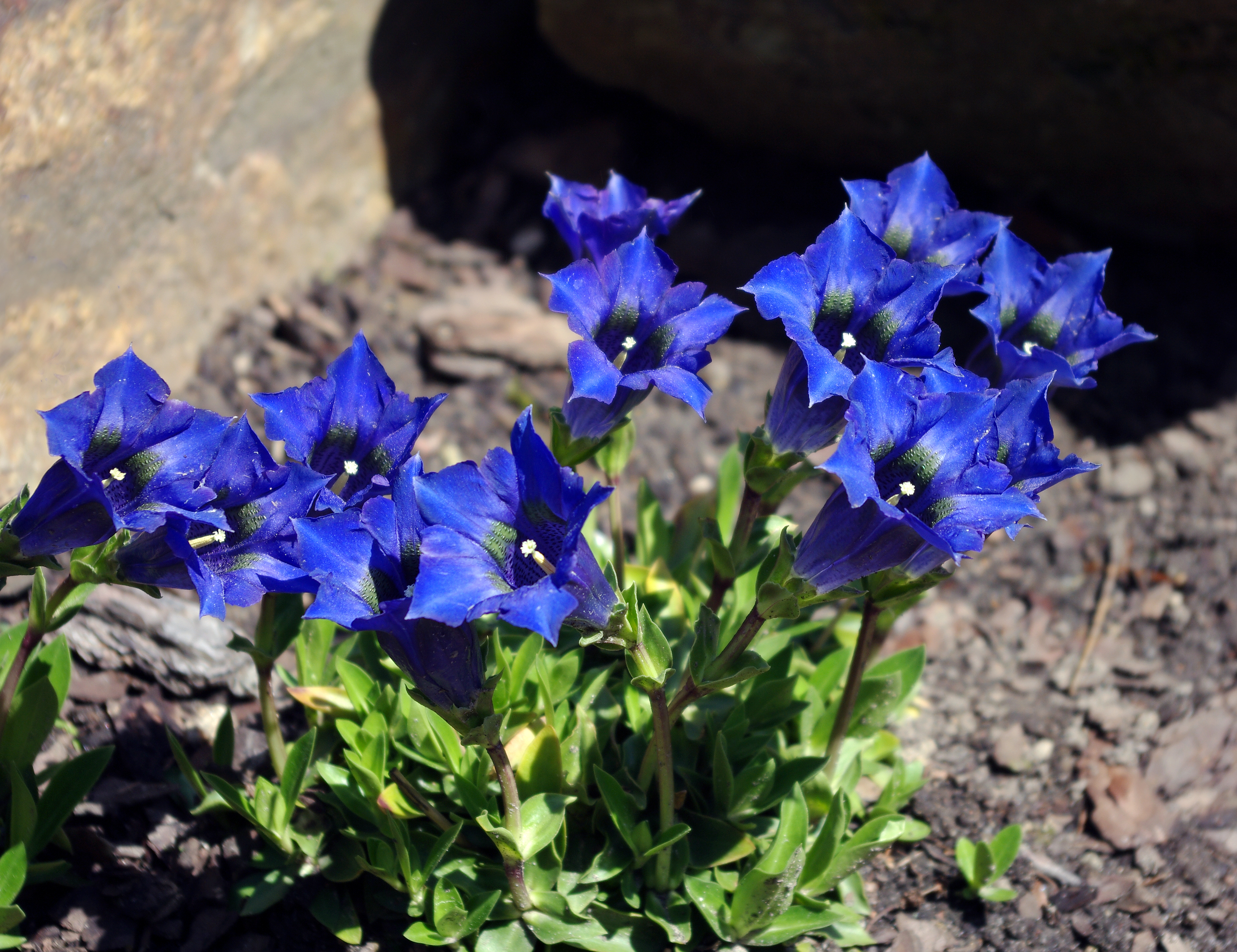

Scientific classification
- Kingdom: Plantae
- Clade: Embryophytes
- Clade: Tracheophytes
- Clade: Spermatophytes
- Clade: Angiosperms
- Clade: Eudicots
- Clade: Asterids
- Order: Gentianales
- Family: Gentianaceae
- Genus: Gentiana
- Species: G. dinarica

Binomial name
- Gentiana dinarica Beck, 1887

= Gentiana dinarica =

Species of flowering plant

Gentiana dinarica, also known as the Dinaric Alpine gentian, is a species of flowering plant in the family Gentianaceae. It is found in southeastern Europe, primarily in the Carpathian region and near the Danube.

== Description ==
Gentiana dinarica is a broadleaf deciduous perennial groundcover with green foliage. In summer blue flowers emerge. When fully matured it has a hight of 4 in (10.16 cm) and a width of 12 in (30.48 cm).
