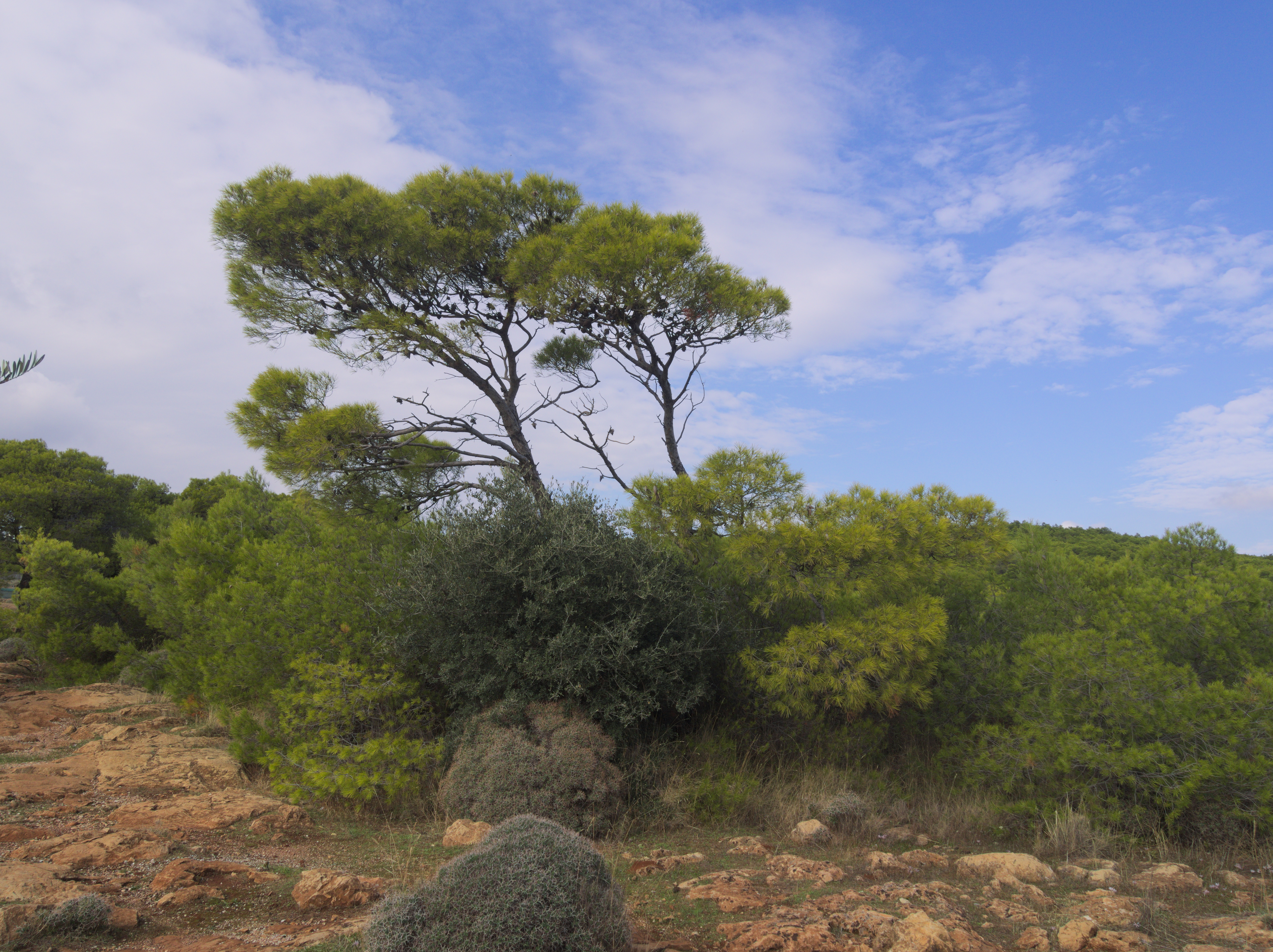
- Pinus halepensis in Sounion Natural Park, Greece

Conservation status
- Least Concern (IUCN 3.1)

Scientific classification
- Kingdom: Plantae
- Clade: Tracheophytes
- Clade: Gymnosperms
- Division: Pinophyta
- Class: Pinopsida
- Order: Pinales
- Family: Pinaceae
- Genus: Pinus
- Subgenus: P. subg. Pinus
- Section: P. sect. Pinus
- Subsection: Pinus subsect. Pinaster
- Species: P. halepensis

Binomial name
- Pinus halepensis Mill.
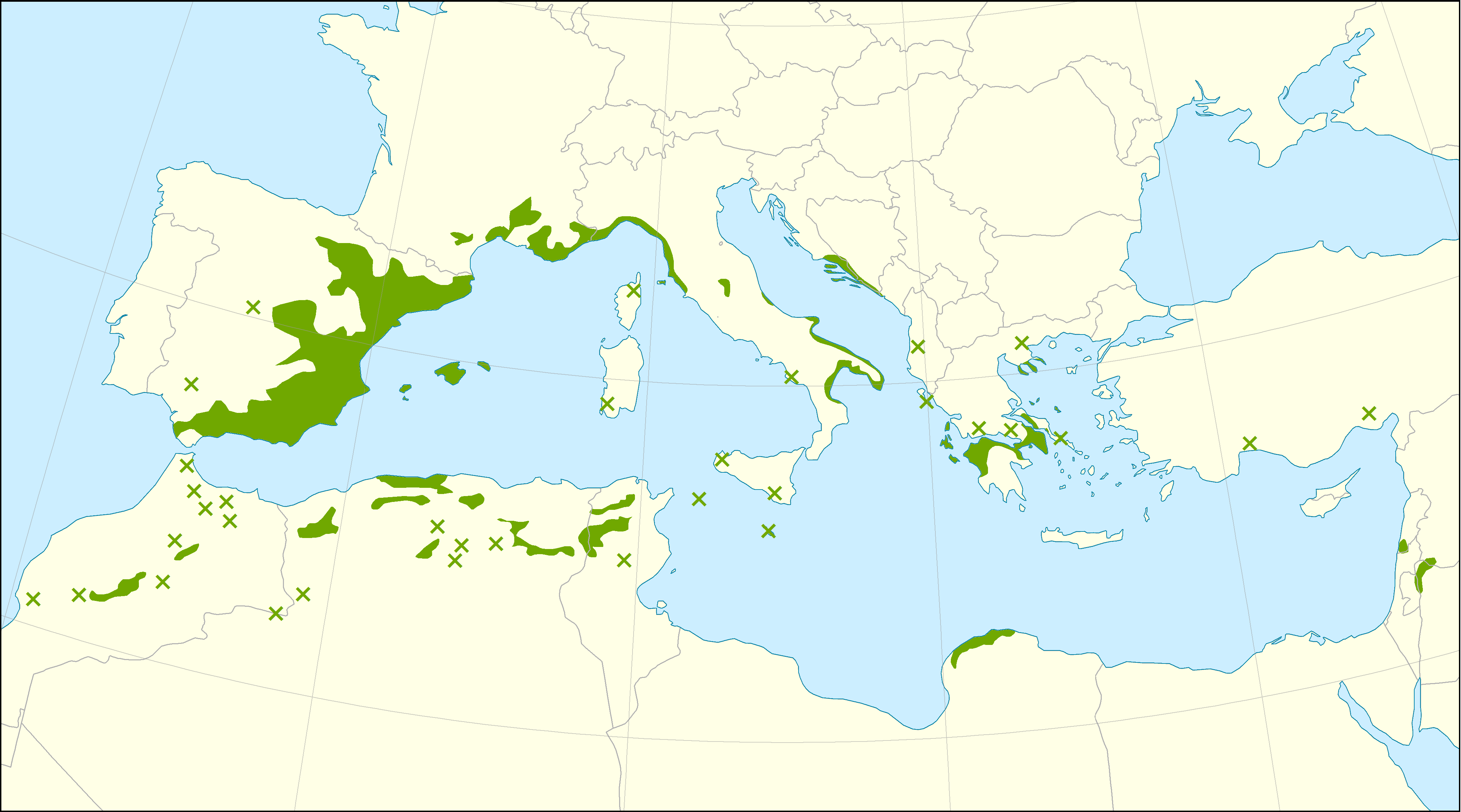
- Distribution map

= Pinus halepensis =

Species of conifer

Pinus halepensis, commonly known as the Aleppo pine, also known as the Jerusalem pine, is a species of conifer in the family Pinaceae, a pine native to the Mediterranean region. It was officially named by the botanist Philip Miller in his 1768 book The Gardener's Dictionary; he probably never went to Aleppo but mentions seeing large specimens at Goodwood in the garden of the Duke of Richmond, which were transplanted (perhaps sent by Alexander Russell from Syria) in 1739.

== Description ==
Pinus halepensis is a small to medium-sized tree, 15–25 metres (49–82 feet) tall, with a trunk diameter up to 60 centimetres (24 inches), exceptionally up to 1 m (3 ft 3 in). The bark is orange-red, thick, and deeply fissured at the base of the trunk, and thin and flaky in the upper crown. The leaves ('needles') are very slender, 6–12 cm (2 1/4–4 3/4 in) long, distinctly yellowish green, and produced in pairs (rarely a few in threes). The cones are narrow conic, 5–12 cm (2–4 3/4 in) long and 2–3 cm (3/4–1 1/4 in) broad at the base when closed, green at first, ripening glossy red-brown when 24 months old. They open slowly over the next few years, a process quickened if they are exposed to heat such as in forest fires. The cones open 5–8 cm (2–3 1/4 in) wide to allow the seeds to disperse. The seeds are 5–6 millimetres (3/16–1/4 in) long, with a 20 mm (13/16 in) wing, and are wind-dispersed.

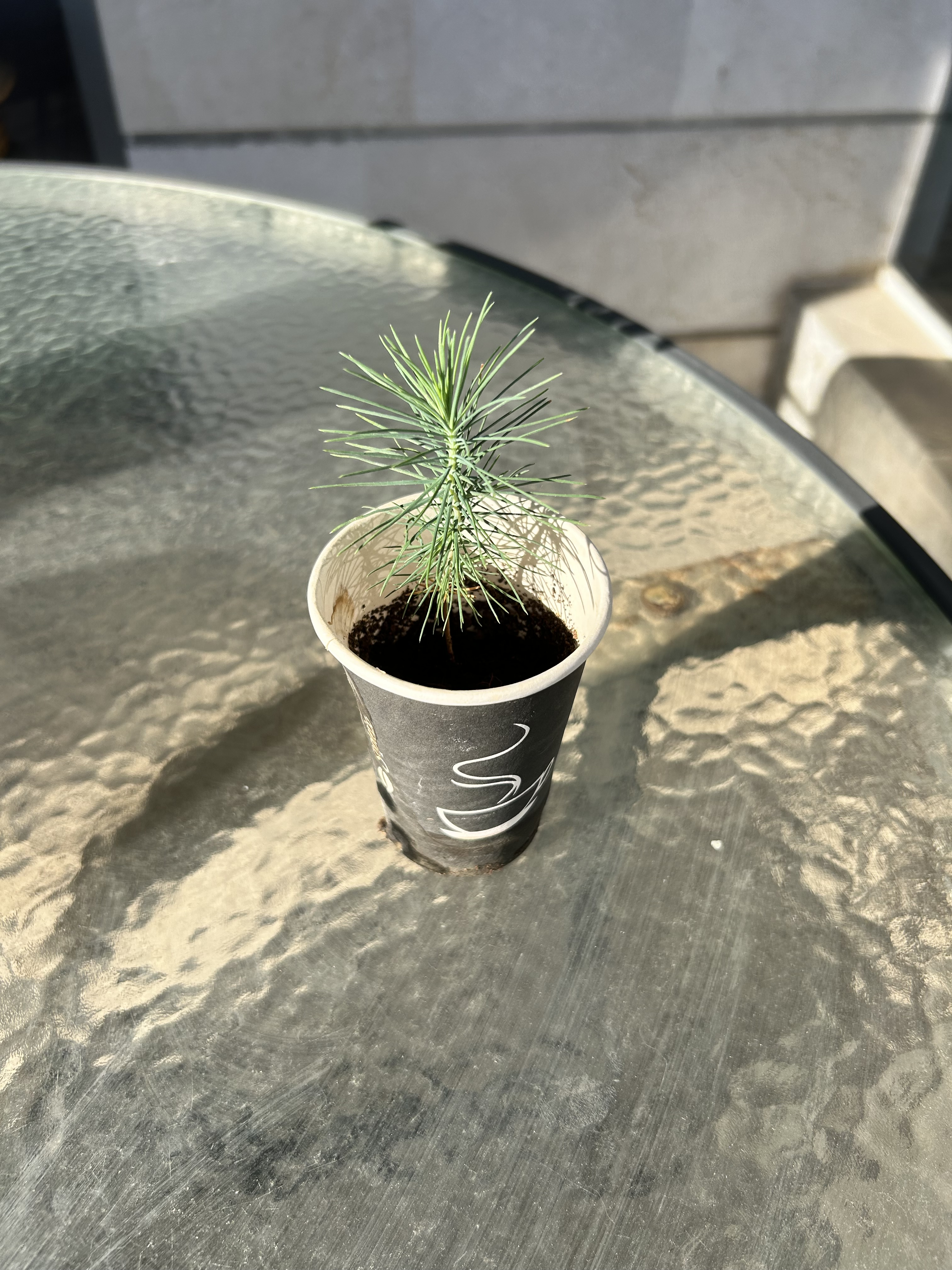
A seedling approximately six months of age

=== Related species ===
The Aleppo pine is closely related to the Turkish pine, Canary Island pine, and maritime pine, which all share many of its characteristics. Some authors include the Turkish pine as a subspecies of the Aleppo pine, as Pinus halepensis subsp. brutia (Ten.) Holmboe, but it is usually regarded as a distinct species. It is a relatively nonvariable species, in that its morphological characteristics stay constant over the entire range.

== Distribution and habitat ==
The native range of Pinus halepensis extends from Morocco, Algeria, Tunisia, and Spain north to southern France, Malta, Italy, Croatia, Montenegro, and Albania, and east to Greece. It has been introduced into many parts of the world, including Portugal. There is an outlying population (from which it was first described) in Syria, Lebanon, southern Turkey, Jordan, Israel and Palestine.

The species is generally found at low altitudes, mostly from sea level to 200 m (660 ft), but can grow above 1,000 m (3,300 ft) in southern and eastern Spain, well over 1,200 m (3,900 ft) on Crete, and up to 1,700 m (5,600 ft) in the south, in Morocco, Algeria and Tunisia. The tree is able to colonise open and disturbed areas quickly. It is classed as an invasive species in South Africa. It can grow on all substrates and almost in all bioclimates in the Mediterranean.

Pinus halepensis is a diagnostic species of the vegetation class Pinetea halepensis.

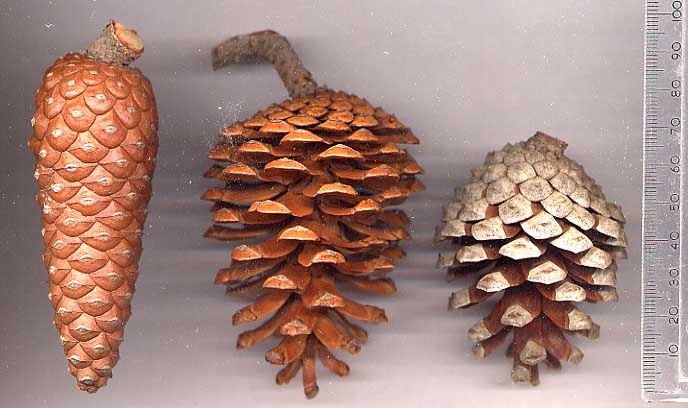
Cones

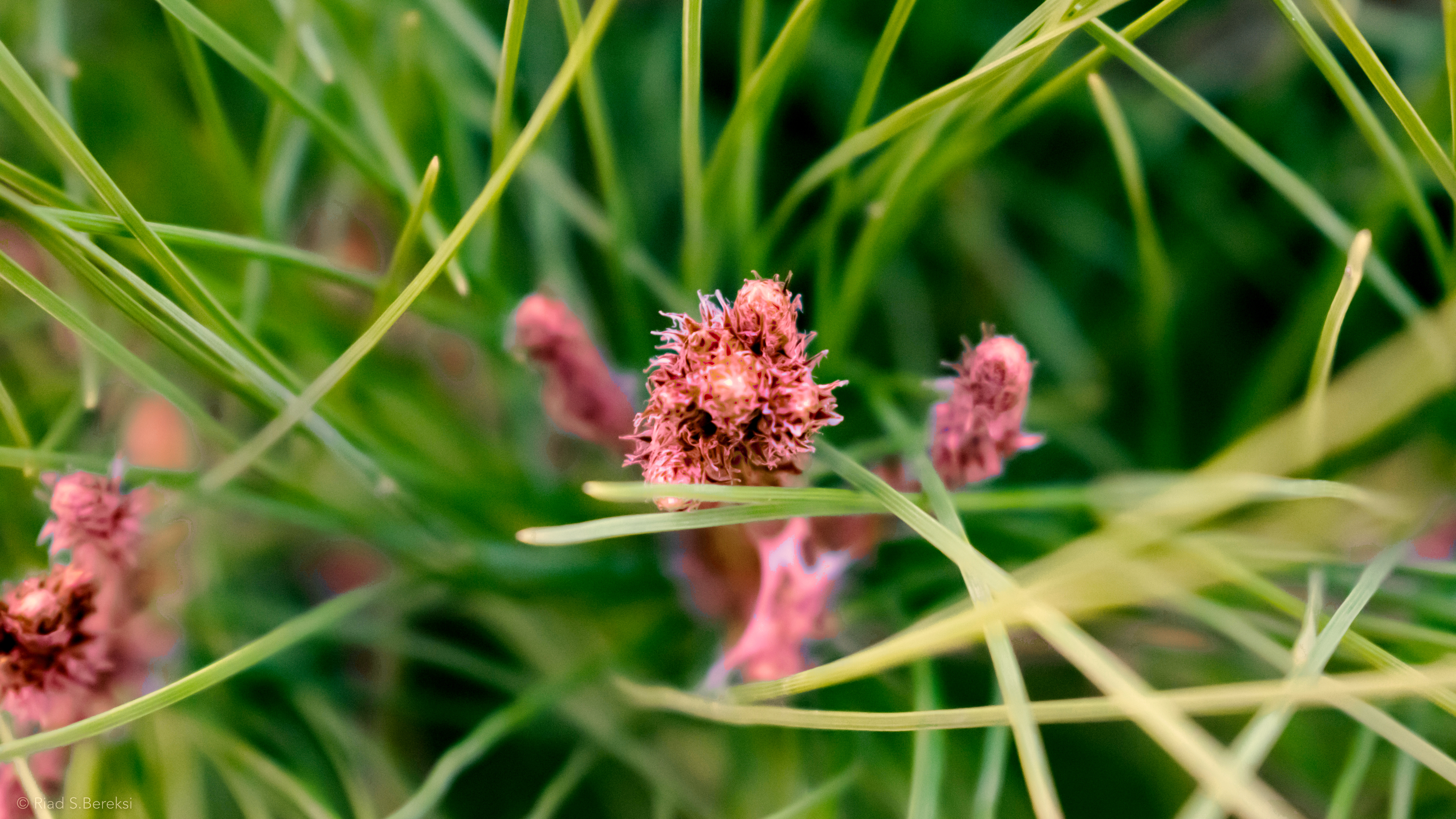
Pinus halepensis, Afhir Forest in Tlemcen.

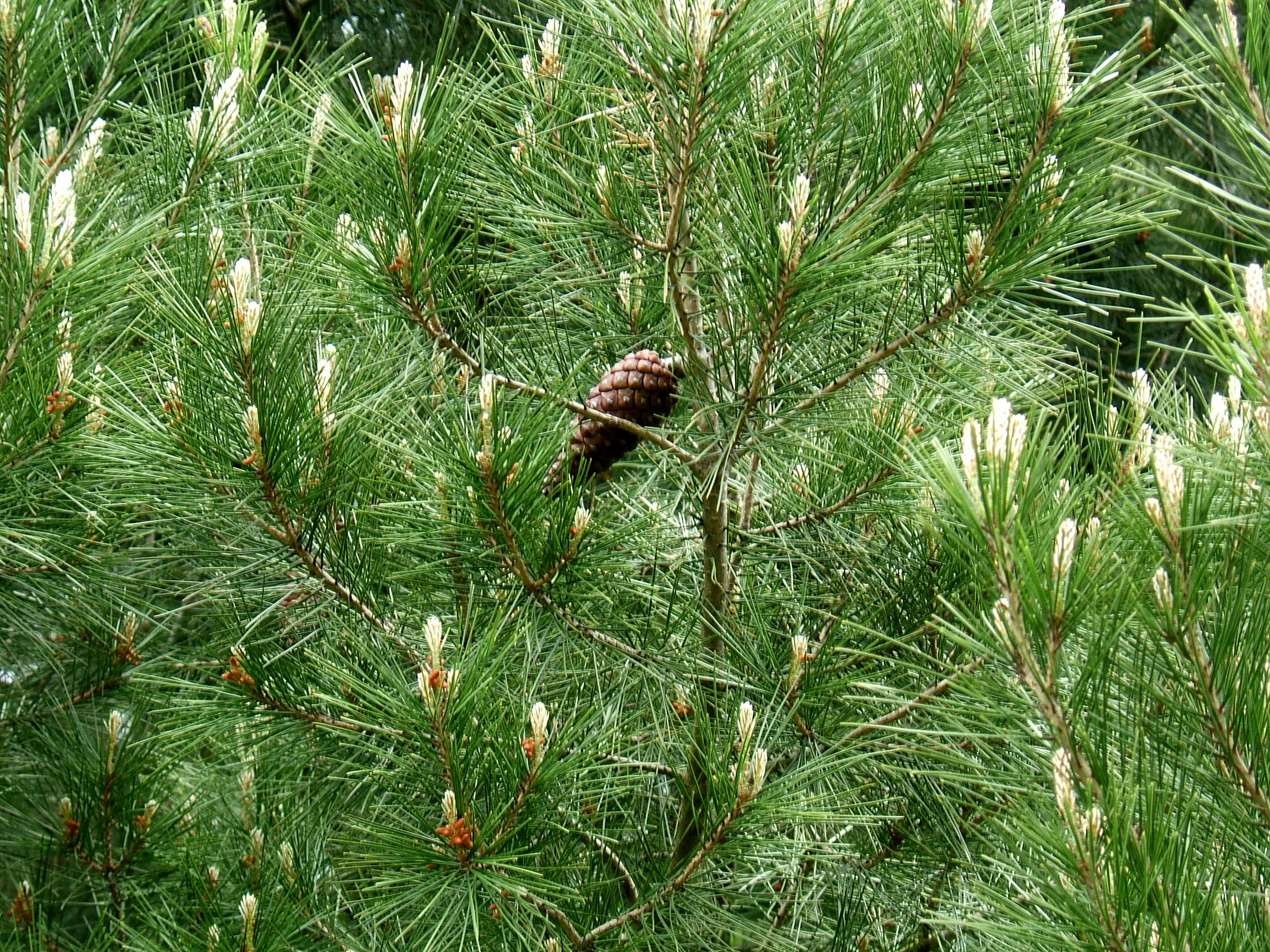
Foliage

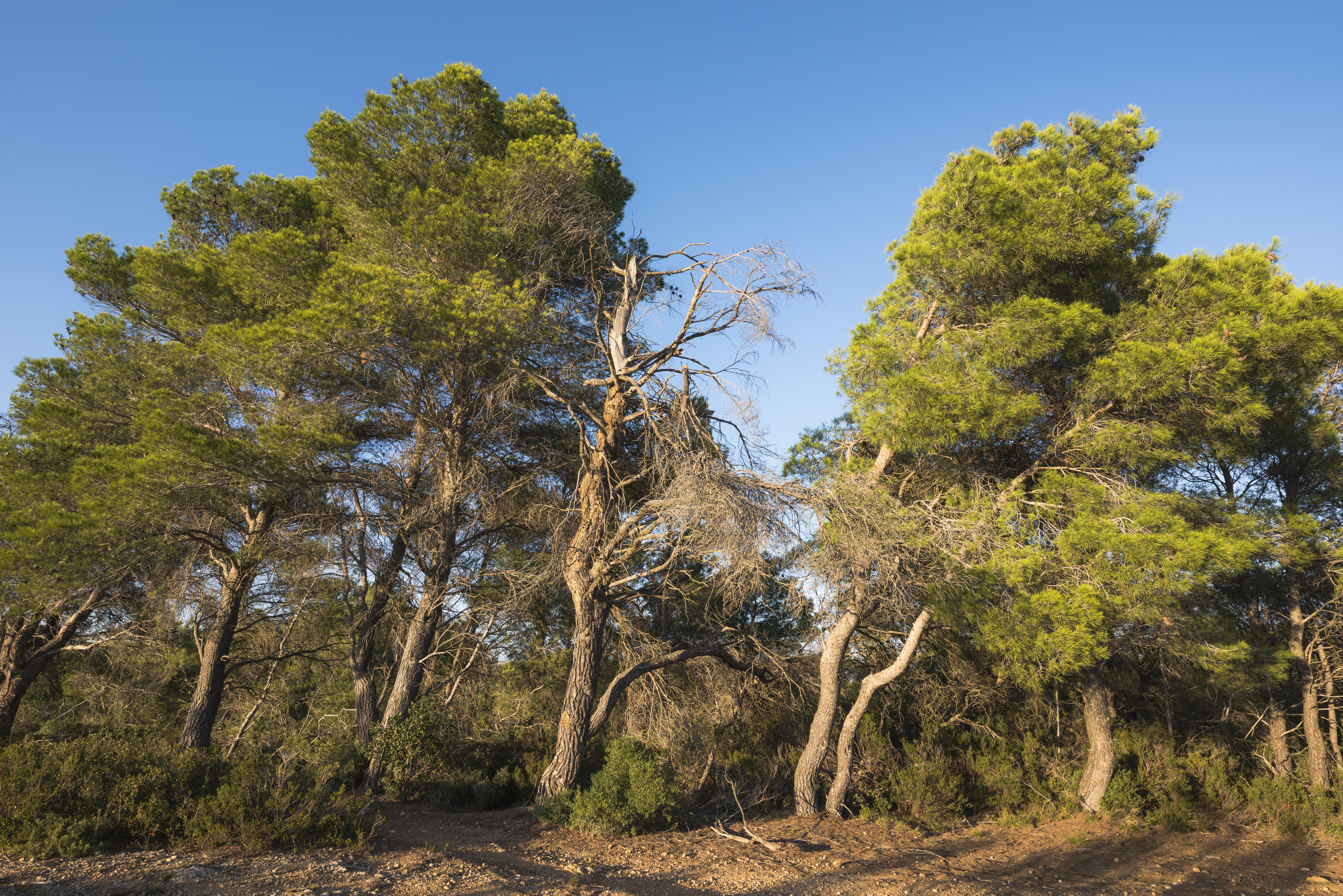
A grove of Aleppo pines in Pinet

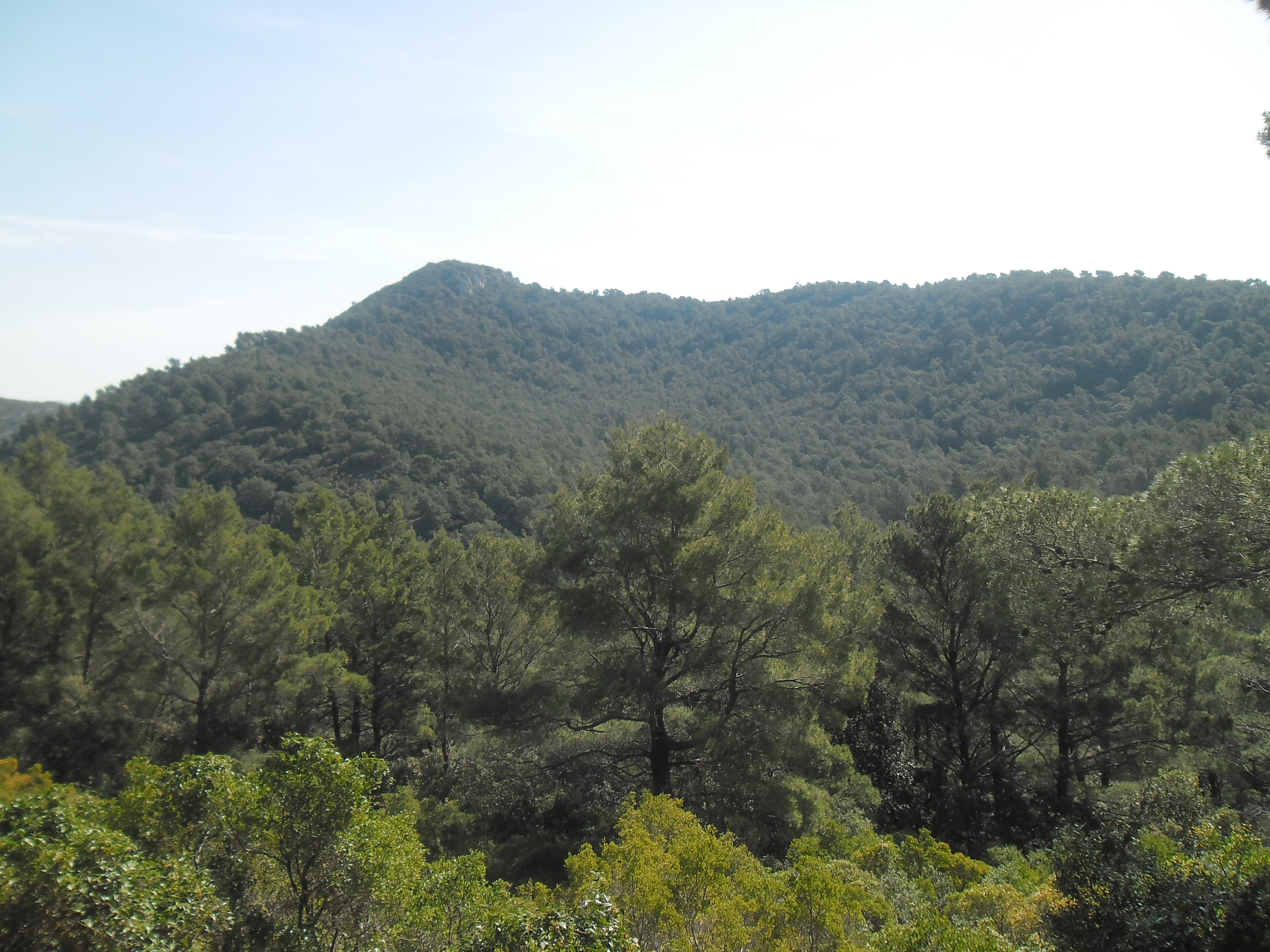
Pinus halepensis forest at the island of Mljet

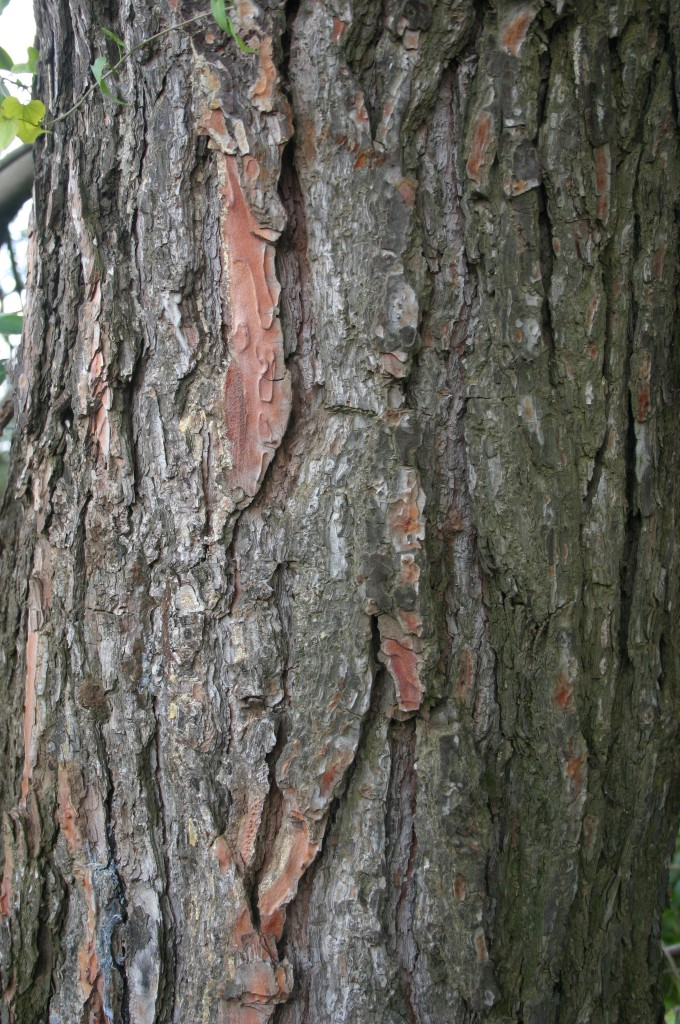
Bark and trunk

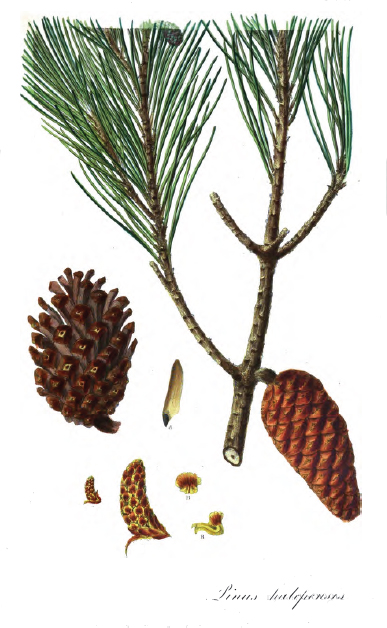
Plate from Lambert's Description of the Genus Pinus

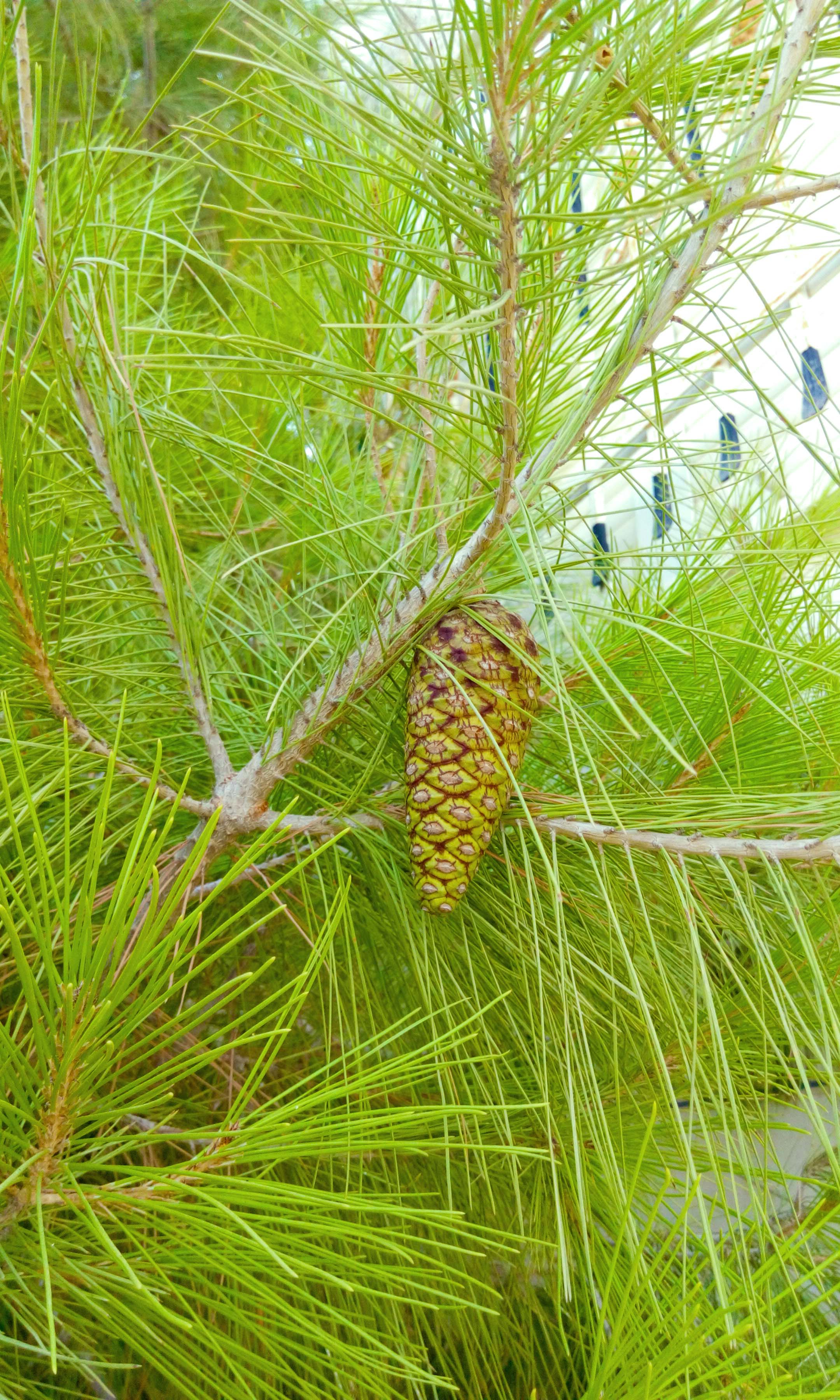
Cone of pinus halepensis in Hebron

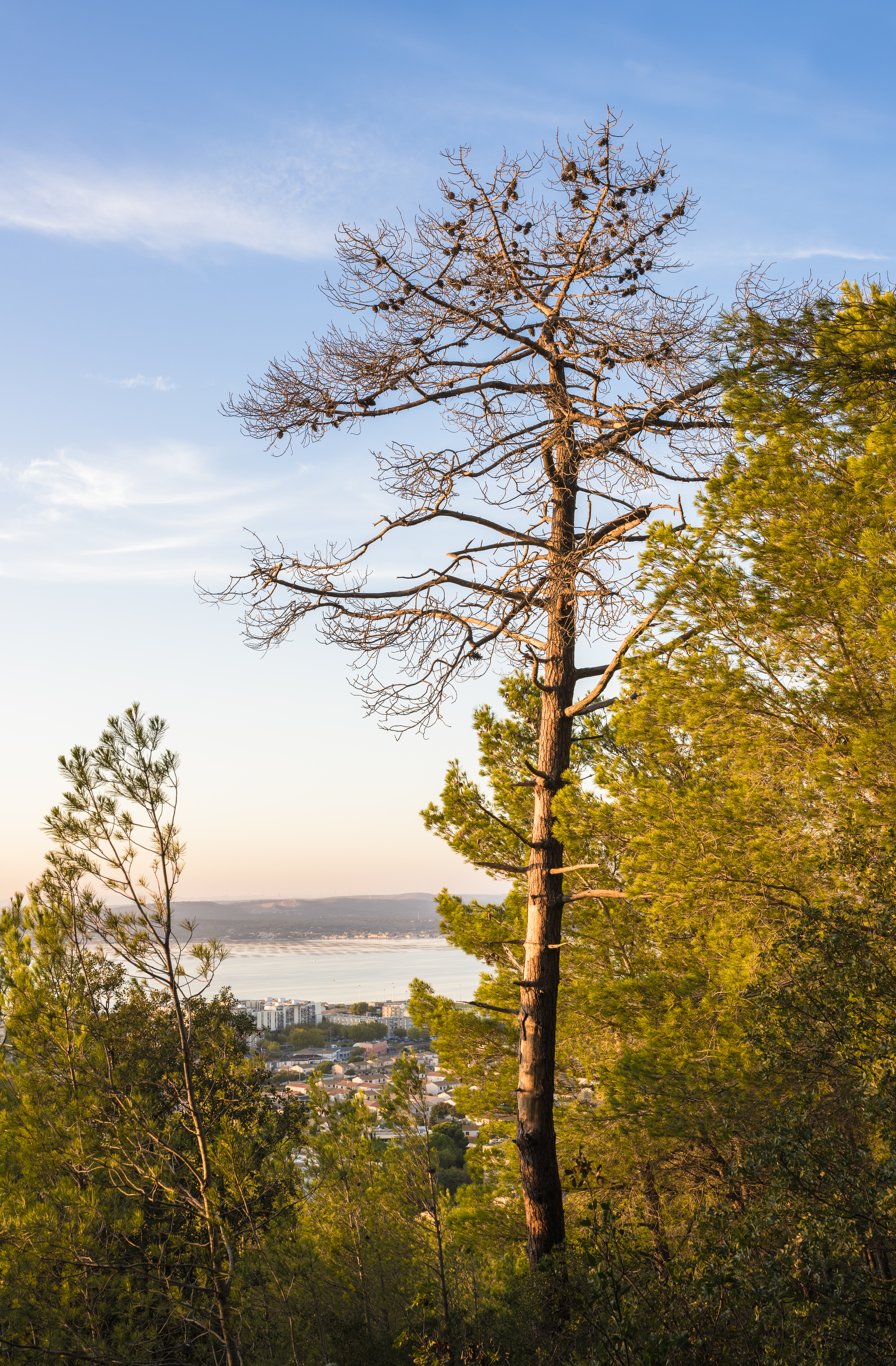
A dead Aleppo pine in front of the Étang de Thau

== Uses ==
=== Local cuisines ===
The resin of the Aleppo pine is used to flavour the Greek wine retsina.

From the pine nuts of the Aleppo pine is made a pudding called asidet zgougou in the Tunisian dialect; it is served in bowls, covered with cream, and topped with almonds and small candies.

The Maltese dessert prinjolata is also prepared using these pine nuts, both in its filling as well as a topping.

=== Forestry ===
In its native area, P. halepensis is widely planted for its fine timber, making it one of the most important forestry trees in Algeria and Morocco.

In Israel, natural patches of Aleppo pine forests can be found in the Carmel and Galilee regions. The Aleppo pine, along with Pinus brutia, has been planted extensively by the Jewish National Fund. It proved very successful in Yatir Forest in the northern Negev (on the edge of the desert), where foresters had not expected it to survive. Many Aleppo pine forests exist today in Israel and are used for recreational purposes. Although it is a local species, some argue that the historical replacement of natural oak maquis shrubland and garrigue with tall stands of pine has created "ecological deserts" and has significantly changed the species assemblage of these regions. The species produces timber which is valued for its hardness, density and unproblematic seasoning. Seasoned timber is inclined to tear out with planing, but this can be avoided by using sharp blades or adjusting the sharpening angle of tools.

The Aleppo pine is considered an invasive species though useful in South Africa; in South Australia, a control program is in place on Eyre Peninsula.

=== Landscape ===
Pinus halepensis is a popular ornamental tree, extensively planted in gardens, parks, and private and agency landscapes in hot dry areas such as Southern California and the Karoo in South Africa, where the Aleppo pine's considerable heat and drought tolerance, fast growth, and aesthetic qualities are highly valued.

Aleppo pine are used for bonsai.

== In culture ==
Paul Cézanne had an Aleppo pine in his garden at Aix-en-Provence; this tree was the inspiration and model for his painting The Big Trees. As of 2005, the tree is still growing in Cézanne's garden.

The Aleppo pine is associated with ANZAC Day and the ANZACs in Australia due to its use by soldiers in the Battle of Lone Pine during the Gallipoli campaign. It is often planted at war memorials.
