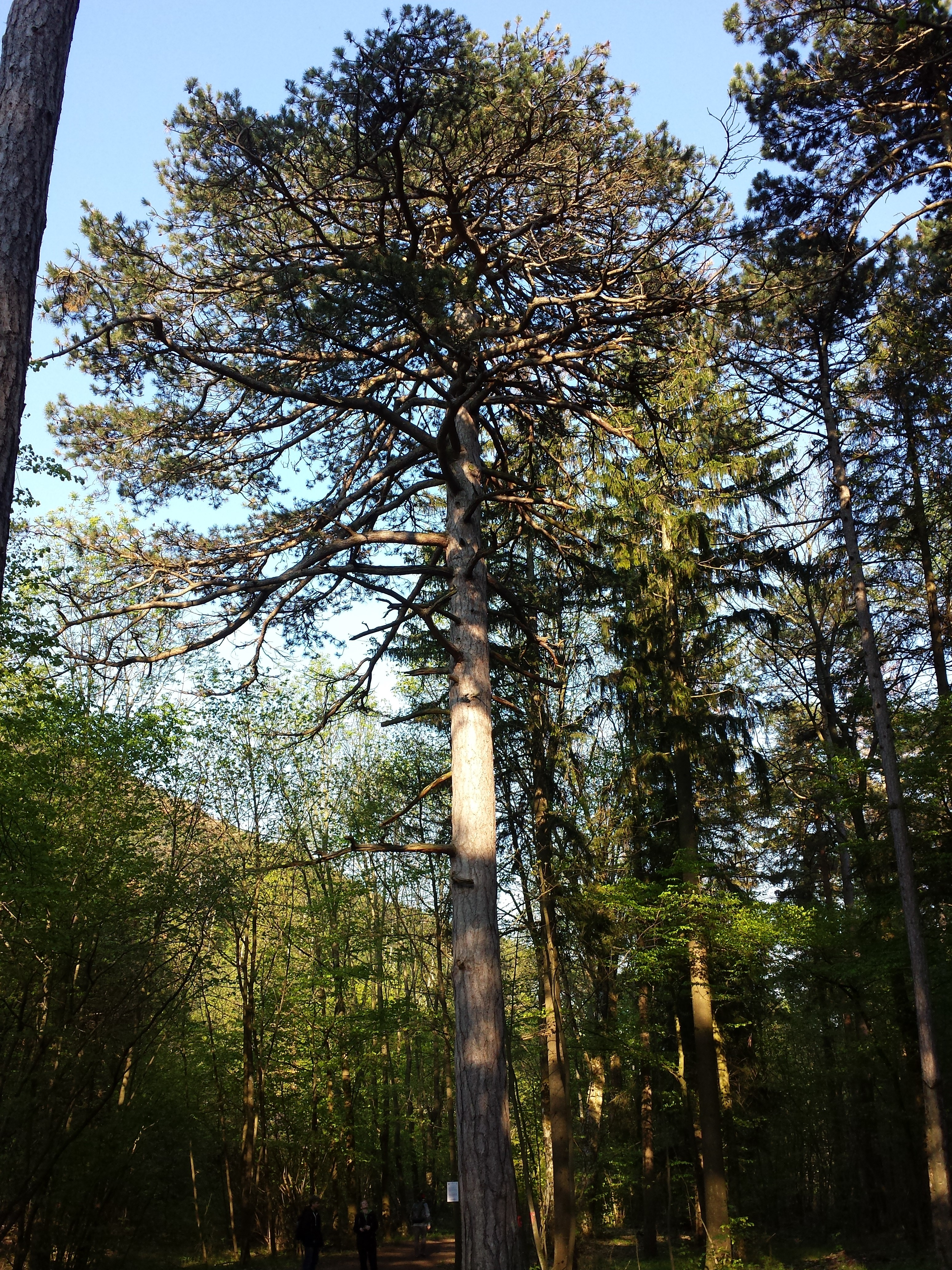
- Pinus nigra subsp. nigra, Bad Vöslau, Lower Austria

Conservation status
- Least Concern (IUCN 3.1)

Scientific classification
- Kingdom: Plantae
- Clade: Tracheophytes
- Clade: Gymnosperms
- Division: Pinophyta
- Class: Pinopsida
- Order: Pinales
- Family: Pinaceae
- Genus: Pinus
- Subgenus: P. subg. Pinus
- Section: P. sect. Pinus
- Subsection: P. subsect. Pinus
- Species: P. nigra

Binomial name
- Pinus nigra J.F. Arnold
- Pinus nigra subsp. salzmannii. Pinus nigra subsp. laricio. Pinus nigra subsp. nigra. Pinus nigra subsp. dalmatica. Pinus nigra subsp. pallasiana.

= Pinus nigra =

European black pine

Species of conifer

Pinus nigra, the European black pine, is a moderately variable species of conifer in the family Pinaceae, a pine native across Southern Europe from the Iberian Peninsula and Lower Austria to the eastern Mediterranean, on the Anatolian peninsula of Turkey, Corsica and Cyprus, as well as Crimea and in the high mountains of Northwest Africa. Several of the regional populations have their own names, including Austrian pine, Corsican pine, Crimean pine, and Pyreneean pine.

== Description ==
Pinus nigra is a large coniferous tree, growing to 20–55 m (66–180 ft) high at maturity and spreading to 6 to 12 m (20 to 39 ft) wide. The bark is grey to yellow-brown, and is widely split by flaking fissures into scaly plates, becoming increasingly fissured with age. The leaves ('needles') are (4–)10–18 cm long, thinner and more flexible in western populations.

The ovulate (female) and pollen (male) cones appear from May to June. The mature seed cones are 5–10 cm (2–4 in) (rarely to 11 cm/4 in) long, with rounded scales; they ripen from green to pale grey-buff or yellow-buff in September to November, about 18 months after pollination. The seeds are dark grey, 6–8 mm (1/4–5/16 in) long, with a yellow-buff wing 20–25 mm (3/4–1 in) long; they are wind-dispersed when the cones open from December to April. Maturity is reached at 15–40 years; large seed crops are produced at 2–5 year intervals.

Pinus nigra is moderately fast growing, at about 30–70 cm (12–28 in) per year. It usually has a rounded conic form, that becomes irregular with age. The tree can be long-lived, with some trees over 500 years old. Multiple pests can damage P. nigra, including the bark beetle Tomicus piniperda.

== Taxonomy ==
The species is divided into two subspecies, each further subdivided into three varieties. Some authorities (see below) treat several of the varieties at subspecific rank, but this "reflects a long-standing European tradition of endless splitting more than sound taxonomy", as the distinctions between the taxa are small.

Subspecies

- P. nigra subsp. nigra in the east of the range, from Austria, northeast and central Italy, east to the Crimea and Turkey. Needles stout, rigid, 1.5–2 mm (1/16–3/32 in) diameter, with 3–6 layers of thick-walled hypodermal cells.
  - P. nigra subsp. nigra var. nigra (syn. Pinus nigra var. austriaca, Pinus nigra subsp. dalmatica) (Austrian pine): Austria, Balkans (except southern Greece).
  - P. nigra subsp. nigra var. caramanica (Turkish black pine): Turkey, Cyprus, southern Greece.
  - P. nigra subsp. nigra var. pallasiana (syn. Pinus nigra subsp. pallasiana) (Crimean pine): Crimea, Cyprus.
- P. nigra subsp. salzmannii in the west of the range, from southern Italy to southern France, Spain and North Africa. Needles slender, more flexible, 0.8–1.5 mm (1/32–1/16 in) diameter, with 1–2 layers of thin-walled hypodermal cells.
  - P. nigra subsp. salzmannii var. salzmannii (Pyrenean pine): Pyrenees, Southern France, Northern Spain.
  - P. nigra subsp. salzmannii var. corsicana (syn. Pinus nigra subsp. laricio, Pinus nigra var. maritima) (Corsican pine): Corsica, Sicily, Southern Italy.
  - P. nigra subsp. salzmannii var. mauretanica (Atlas Mountains black pine): Morocco, Algeria.
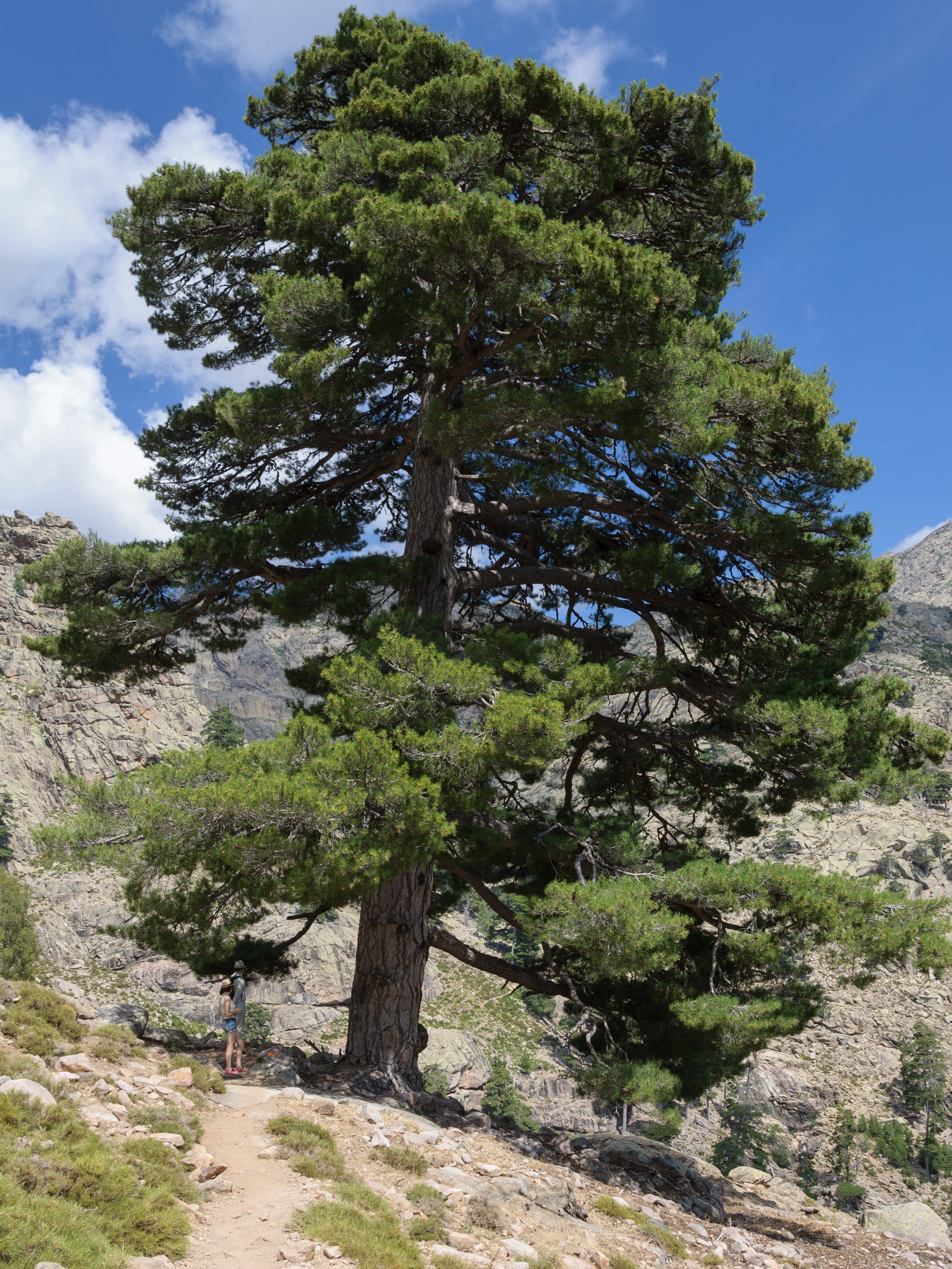
Pinus nigra var. corsicana (Corsican pine) in Corsica

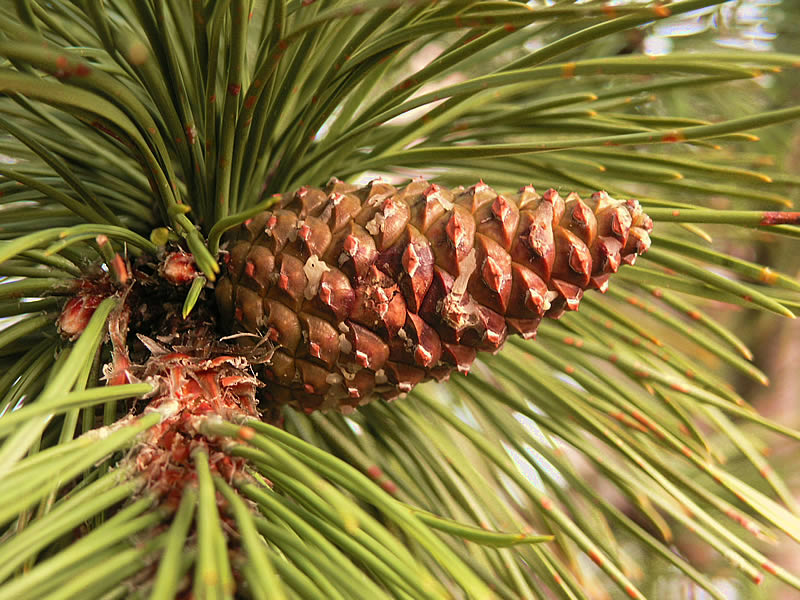
Foliage and closed cone of subsp. nigra

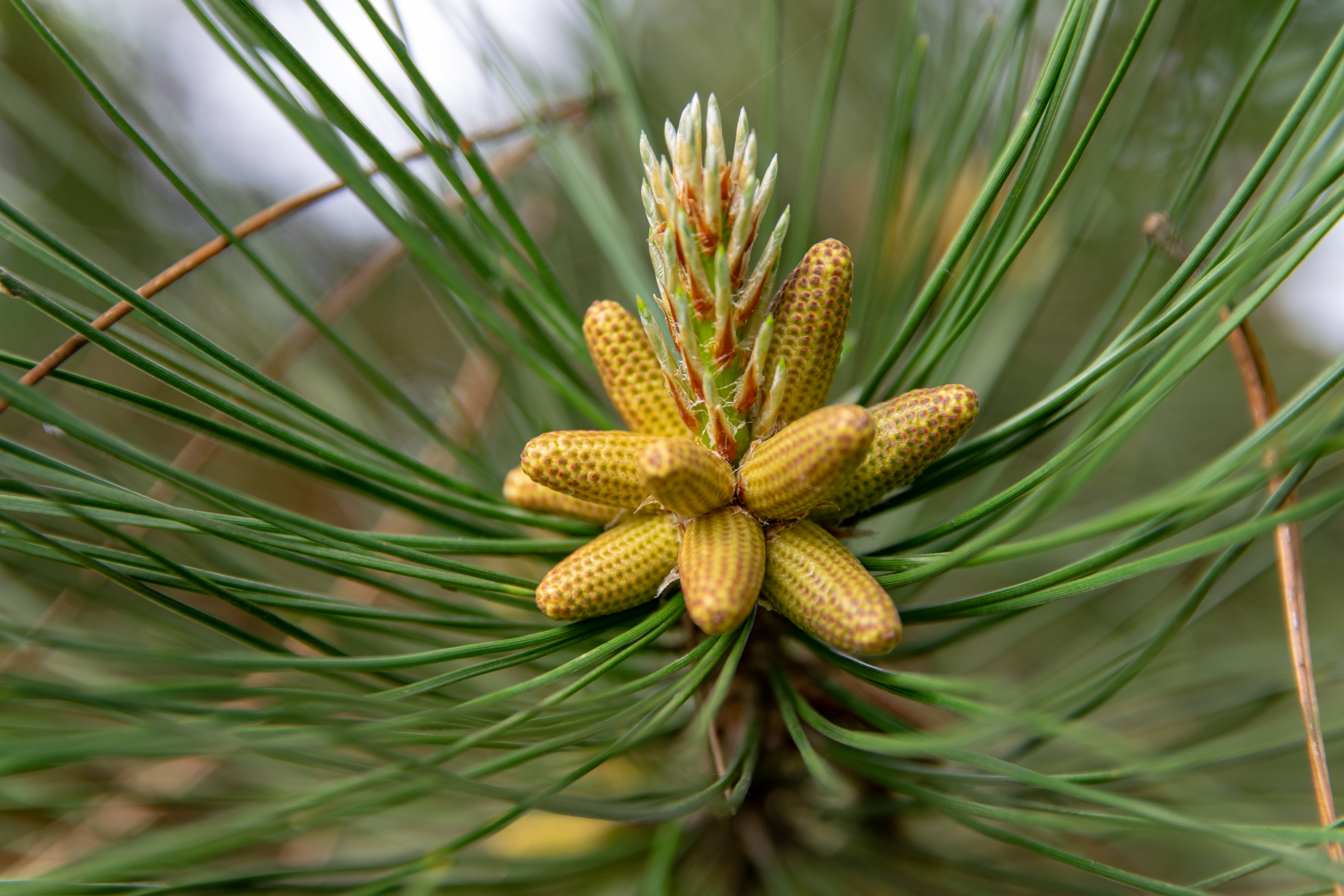
Pollen cones of subsp. nigra

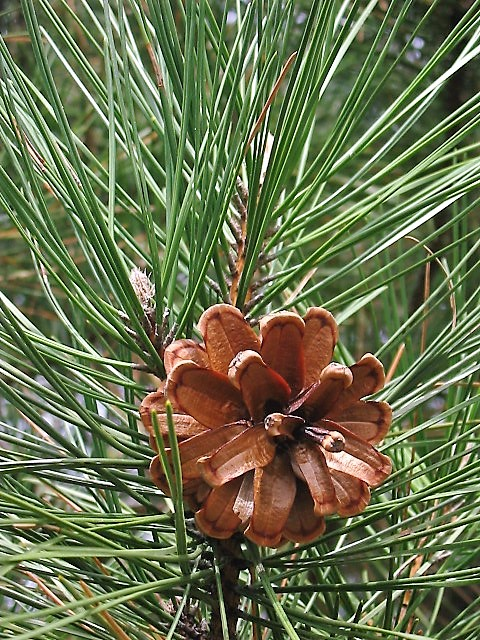
Foliage and open cone of subsp. salzmannii var. salzmannii in Spain

The Flora Europaea, followed by the Plants of the World Online database and the Gymnosperm Database, follows a more splitting approach with five subspecies and one variety:

- Pinus nigra subsp. dalmatica (Vis.) Franco (synonyms P. dalmatica Vis., P. nigra var. dalmatica (Vis.) Businský, P. nigra f. leucodermoides Fukarek & M.Nikolic). Endemic to Croatia, where it is found on the islands of Brač, Hvar, and Korčula and the Pelješac peninsula. The IUCN Red List assessed it as endangered.
- Pinus nigra subsp. laricio Palib. ex Maire (synonyms P. altissima Carrière, P. italica Herter, P. karamana Mast., P. laricio Poir., P. nigra var. calabrica (Loudon) C.K.Schneid., P. nigra var. corsicana (Loudon) Hyl., P. nigra var. maritima (Aiton) Melville, P. sylvestris var. maritima Aiton) – Corsican Pine. Native to Corsica, Sicily, and the southern Apennines in Calabria. The IUCN Red List assesses the subspecies as least-concern.
- Pinus nigra subsp. nigra eastern Austria to the Balkan Peninsula – Albania, Bosnia and Herzegovina, Bulgaria, Croatia, Greece, Montenegro, North Macedonia, Romania, Serbia, and Slovenia.
- Pinus nigra subsp. pallasiana (Lamb.) Holmboe (synonyms P. fenzleyi Antoine & Kotschy ex Carrière, P. nigra subsp. caramanica (Loudon) Businský, P. pallasiana Lamb., P. pontica K.Koch, P. taurica (Loudon) Steud.) Native to Cyprus, the East Aegean Islands, Crimean Peninsula, North Caucasus, and European and Asiatic Turkey.
- Pinus nigra subsp. salzmannii (Dunal) Franco (synonyms P. nigra var. mauretanica Maire & Peyerimh., P. nigra var. 'monspeliensis (Lavallée) Slavin, P. pyrenaica Lapeyr., P. salzmannii Dunal) – south-central France (Cévennes forest) to the Pyrenees, Spain, northern Morocco (Rif Mountains), and Algeria (Hodna Mountains).
- Pinus nigra f. seneriana (Saatçioglu) Kandemir & Mataraci – northwestern Turkey.
- Pinus nigra var. yaltirikiana Alptekin – northern Turkey.

== Distribution and habitat ==
Pinus nigra is a tree of the Mediterranean forests, woodlands, and scrub biome. The majority of the range is in Turkey. It is found in the higher elevations of the South Apennine mixed montane forests ecoregion in southern Italy and the Tyrrhenian-Adriatic sclerophyllous and mixed forests ecoregion in Sicily. There are remnant populations in the Mediterranean conifer and mixed forests ecoregion of northwestern Africa, specifically in the Rif Mountains of Morocco and Hodna Mountains of Algeria.

It is found at elevations ranging from sea level to 2,000 m (6,600 ft), most commonly from 250–1,600 m (820–5,250 ft). Several of the varieties have distinct English names. It needs full sun to grow well, is intolerant of shade, and is resistant to snow and ice damage.

=== Oldest tree ===
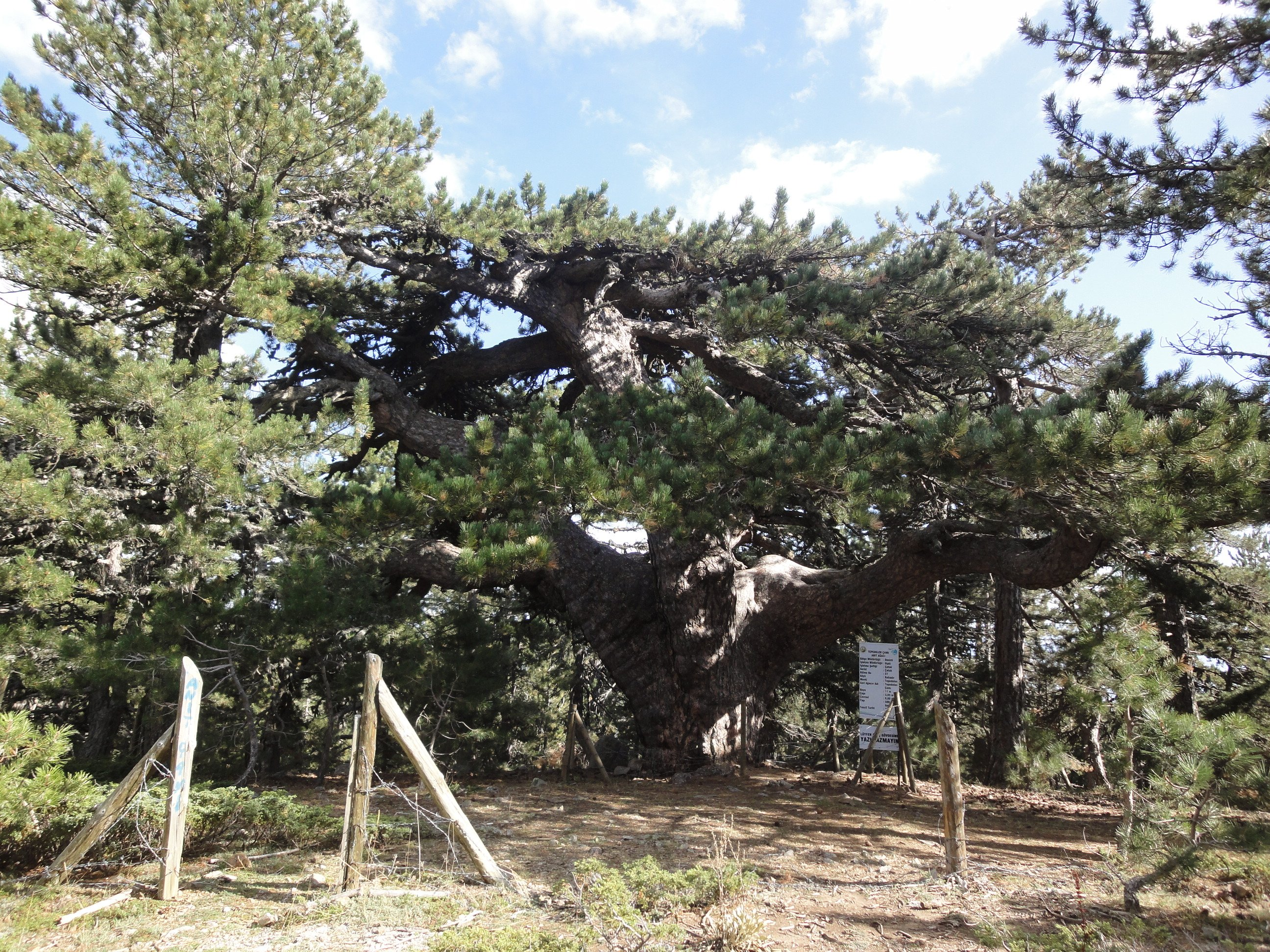
The world's oldest black pine tree is about 1,000 years old and is in Turkey

The world's oldest black pine, located in the Banaz district of Uşak, Turkey, is estimated to be 1,000 years old. It has a height of 11 m (36 ft), a diameter of 3 m (10 ft) and a circumference of 9.60 m (31 1/2 ft).

== Ecology ==
In Mediterranean Europe and the Anatolian Peninsula (Asia Minor), trees usually associated with this species include Scots pine (Pinus sylvestris), Serbian spruce (Picea omorika), Bosnian pine (Pinus heldreichii), Norway spruce (Picea abies), Taurus cedar (Cedrus libani), European silver fir (Abies alba) and related firs. Several species of juniper (Juniperus spp.), and various broadleaf trees are associates.

=== Climate and provenance ===
Pinus nigra is a light-demanding species, intolerant of shade but resistant to wind and drought. The eastern P. nigra subsp. nigra exhibits greater winter frost hardiness (hardy to below −30 °C/−22 °F) than the western P. nigra subsp. salzmannii (hardy to about −25 °C/−13 °F).

Different provenances (seed sources by geographic area) or varieties are adapted to different soil types: Austrian and Pyrenees origins grow well on a wide range of soil types, Corsican origins grows poorly on limestone, while Turkish and Crimean origins grow well on limestone. Most provenances also show good growth on podzolic soils.

=== As an invasive species ===
Pinus nigra has become naturalised in a few areas of the US. In New Zealand it is considered an invasive species and noxious weed, along with lodgepole pine (P. contorta) and Scots pine (P. sylvestris), due to their habitat conversion nature in tussock grassland plant communities, shading out the native bunch grasses as their forest canopy develops.

== Cultivation and uses ==
=== Timber ===
The timber of European black pine is similar to that of the European Scots pine (P. sylvestris) and the North American red pine (P. resinosa), being moderately hard and straight-grained. It does however tend to be rougher, softer, and not as strong, due to its faster growth. It is used for general construction, fuel, and in paper manufacture.

In the United Kingdom, Pinus nigra is important both as a timber tree and in plantations (primarily Corsican pine subsp.). Recently however, serious problems have occurred with red band needle blight disease, caused by the fungus Dothistroma septosporum, resulting in a major recent decline in forestry planting there.

=== As an ornamental tree ===
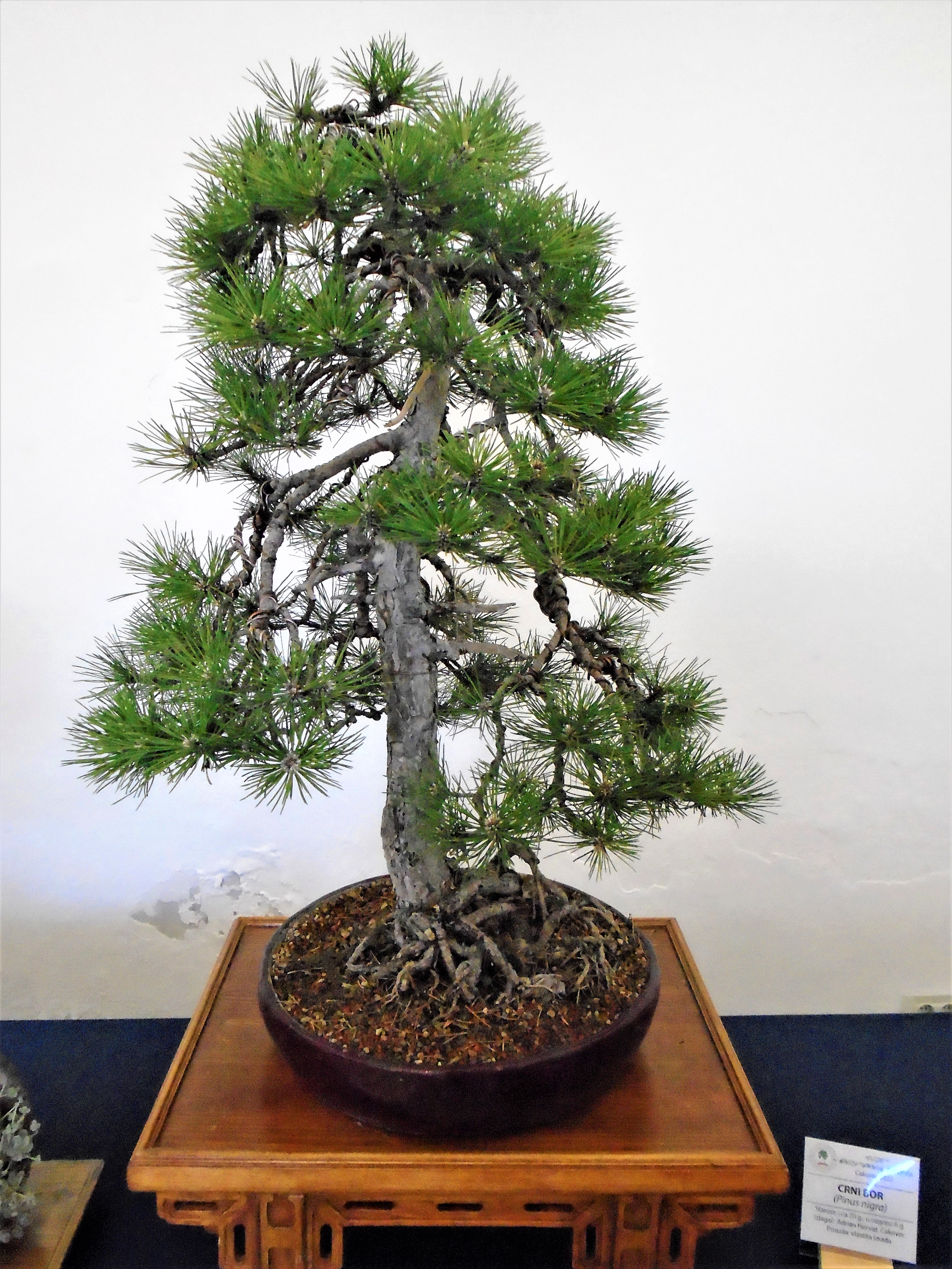
Bonsai Pinus nigra

In the US and Canada, the European black pine is planted as a street tree, and as an ornamental tree in gardens and parks. Its value as a street tree is largely due to its resistance to salt spray (from road de-icing salt) and various industrial pollutants (including ozone), and its intermediate drought tolerance. It is planted with great success as far north as Edmonton, Alberta, Canada.

In the UK the tree is planted as an ornamental tree in parks and gardens.

Pinus nigra is also used in bonsai.

== See also ==
- Austrian Resin Extraction
