= List of ecoregions in Europe =

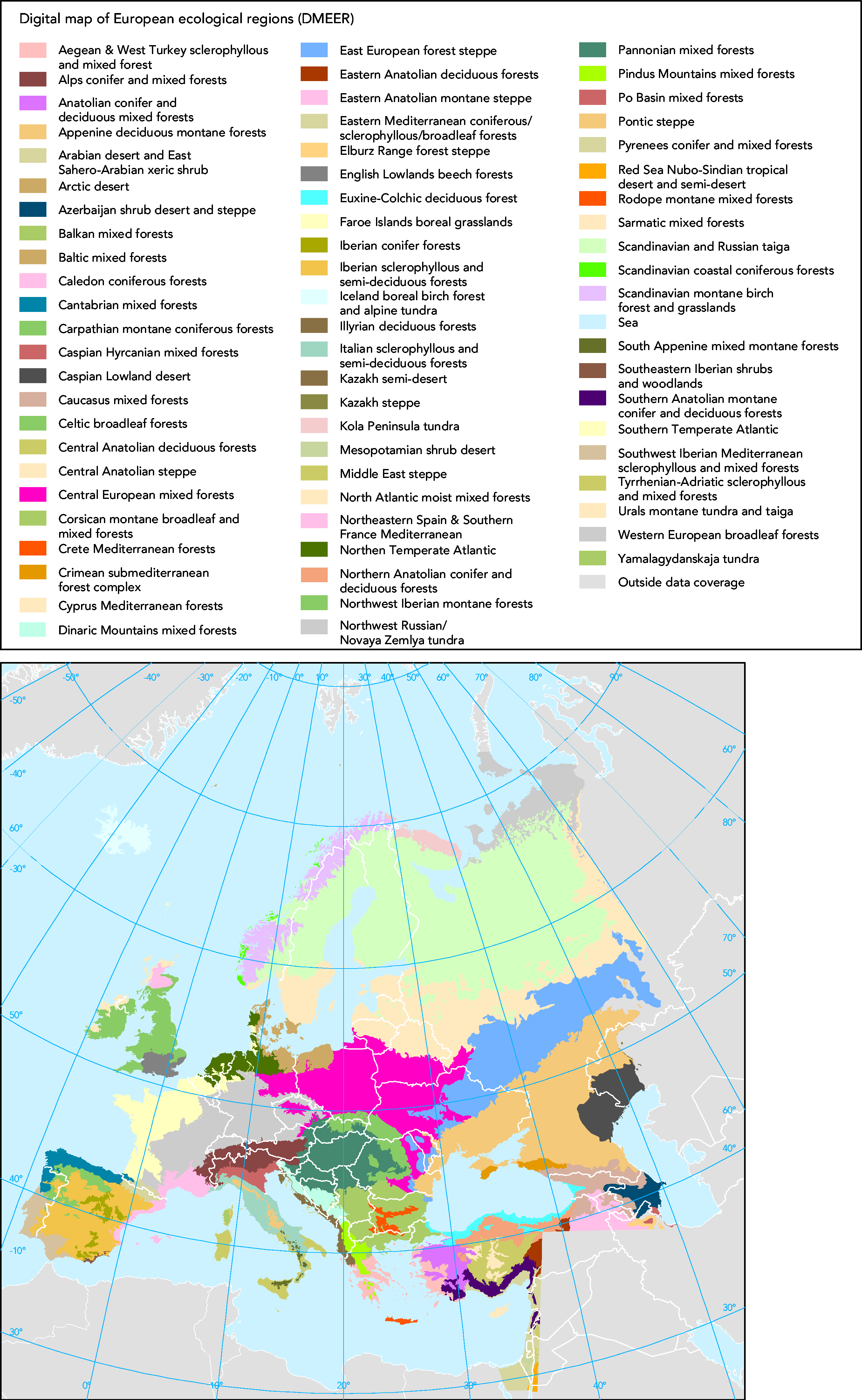
EEA's DMEER

The continent of Europe comprises a large part of the Palearctic ecozone, with many unique biomes and ecoregions. Biogeographically, Europe is tied closely to Siberia, commonly known as the Euro-Siberian region.

The European Environment Agency (EEA) divides Europe into a total of eleven terrestrial biogeographical regions and seven regional seas. The agency has issued the Digital Map of European Ecological Regions (DMEER), and operates with a total of 70 ecoregions, of which 58 are within the European continent. Some of these ecoregions are congruent with the World Wildlife Fund's (WWF) ecoregions, and some are not.

== List of ecoregions in Europe ==
Below is an exhaustive list of the ecoregions of Europe as defined by the WWF.

=== Temperate broadleaf and mixed forests ===
WWF ID	Ecoregion (WWF)	Country	Map	Photo
PA0401	Apennine deciduous montane forests (Note: Ecoregions in the WWF's Global 200 composite ecoregion European-Mediterranean montane mixed forest include: 6 Temperate coniferous forests: Apennine deciduous montane forests (Austria, France, Italy, Slovenia, Switzerland); Crimean Submediterranean forest complex (Russia, Ukraine); Dinaric Mountains mixed forests (Albania, Bosnia and Herzegovina, Croatia, Italy, Montenegro, Serbia, Slovenia); North African Mediterranean conifer and mixed forests (Algeria, Morocco, Tunisia); Pyrenees conifer and mixed forests (France, Spain); Rodope montane mixed forests (Bulgaria, Greece, Macedonia, Serbia); and 2 Temperate coniferous forests: Alps conifer and mixed forests (Austria, France, Italy, Slovenia, Switzerland); Carpathian montane conifer forests (Czech Republic, Poland, Romania, Slovakia, Ukraine))	Italy		
PA0402	Atlantic mixed forests	Belgium, Denmark, France, Netherlands, Germany		
PA0403	Azores temperate mixed forests	Portugal		
PA0404	Balkan mixed forests	Bosnia and Herzegovina, Bulgaria, Greece, Kosovo, North Macedonia, Romania, Serbia, Turkey		
PA0405	Baltic mixed forests (Note: Baltic mixed forests include Natural beech wood)	Denmark, Germany, Poland, Sweden		
PA0406	Cantabrian mixed forests	Spain, France, Portugal		
PA0408	Caucasus mixed forests (Note: Ecoregions in the WWF's Global 200 composite ecoregion Caucasus-Anatolian-Hyrcanian temperate forests include: 4 Temperate coniferous forests: Caucasus mixed forests (Armenia, Azerbaijan, Iran, Georgia, Russia, Turkey); Elburz Range forest steppe (Iran); Northern Anatolian conifer and deciduous forests (Turkey); 2 Temperate broadleaf and mixed forests: Caspian Hyrcanian mixed forests (Azerbaijan, Iran); Euxine-Colchic deciduous forests (Bulgaria, Georgia, Turkey); and 1 Montane grasslands and shrublands: Kopet Dag woodlands and forest steppe (Iran, Turkmenistan))	Armenia, Azerbaijan, Georgia, Iran, Russia, and Turkey		
PA0409	Celtic broadleaf forests	Ireland, United Kingdom		
PA0412	Central European mixed forests	Austria, Belarus, Czech Republic, Germany, Lithuania, Moldova, Poland, Romania, Russia, Ukraine		
PA0416	Crimean Submediterranean forest complex	Russia, Ukraine		
PA0418	Dinaric Mountains mixed forests	Albania, Bosnia and Herzegovina, Croatia, Italy, Kosovo, Montenegro, Serbia, Slovenia		
PA0419	East European forest steppe	Bulgaria, Moldova, Romania, Ukraine, Russia		
PA0421	English Lowlands beech forests	United Kingdom		
PA0422	Euxine-Colchic broadleaf forests	Bulgaria, Georgia, Turkey		
PA0429	North Atlantic moist mixed forests	Ireland, United Kingdom (Northern Ireland and Scotland), Denmark (Faroe Islands)		
PA0431	Pannonian mixed forests	Austria, Bosnia and Herzegovina, Croatia, Czech Republic, Hungary, Romania, Serbia, Slovakia, Slovenia, Ukraine		
PA0432	Po Basin mixed forests	Italy, Switzerland		
PA0433	Pyrenees conifer and mixed forests	Andorra, France, Spain		
PA0435	Rodope montane mixed forests	Bulgaria, Greece, North Macedonia, Serbia		
PA0436	Sarmatic mixed forests	Belarus, Denmark, Estonia, Finland, Latvia, Lithuania, Norway, Russia, Sweden		
PA0445	Western European broadleaf forests	Austria, Belgium, Czech Republic, France, Germany, Luxembourg. Netherlands, Poland, Switzerland		

=== Temperate coniferous forests ===
WWF ID	Ecoregion (WWF)	Country	Map	Photo
PA0501	Alps conifer and mixed forests	Italy, France, Switzerland, Germany, Austria, Slovenia		
PA0503	Caledonian conifer Forest	United Kingdom		
PA0504	Carpathian montane conifer forests	Czech Republic, Poland, Romania, Slovakia, Ukraine		
PA0520	Scandinavian coastal conifer forests	Norway		

=== Taiga and Boreal forests ===
WWF ID	Ecoregion (WWF)	Country	Map	Photo
PA0602	Iceland boreal birch forests and alpine tundra	Iceland		
PA0608	Scandinavian and Russian taiga	Norway, Sweden, Finland, and Russia		
PA0610	Ural montane forests and tundra	Russia		

=== Temperate grasslands, savannas, and shrublands ===
WWF ID	Ecoregion (WWF)	Country	Map	Photo
PA0807	Faroe Islands boreal grasslands	Faroe Islands, Denmark		
PA0814	Pontic steppe	Bulgaria, Romania, Moldova, Ukraine, and Russia		

=== Tundra ===
WWF ID	Ecoregion (WWF)	Country	Map	Photo
PA1101	Arctic desert	Norway and Russia		
PA1106	Kola Peninsula tundra	Norway and Russia		
PA1108	Northwest Russian-Novaya Zemlya tundra	Russia		
PA1110	Scandinavian montane birch forest and grasslands	Norway, Sweden, and Finland		

=== Mediterranean forests, woodlands, and scrub ===
WWF ID	Ecoregion (WWF)	Country	Map	Photo
PA1201	Aegean and Western Turkey sclerophyllous and mixed forests	Greece, North Macedonia, Bulgaria, and Turkey		
PA1204	Corsican montane broadleaf and mixed forests	France		
PA1205	Crete Mediterranean forests	Greece		
PA1208	Iberian conifer forests	Spain		
PA1209	Iberian sclerophyllous and semi-deciduous forests	Spain, Portugal		
PA1210	Illyrian deciduous forests	Albania, Bosnia-Herzegovina, Croatia, Greece, Italy, Montenegro, Slovenia		
PA1211	Italian sclerophyllous and semi-deciduous forests	Italy, France		
PA1215	Northeastern Spain and Southern France Mediterranean forests	France, Spain		
PA1216	Northwest Iberian montane forests	Portugal, Spain		
PA1217	Pindus Mountains mixed forests	Greece, North Macedonia, and Albania		
PA1218	South Apennine mixed montane forests	Italy		
PA1219	Southeastern Iberian shrubs and woodlands	Spain		
PA1221	Southwest Iberian Mediterranean sclerophyllous and mixed forests	Portugal, Spain		
PA1222	Tyrrhenian–Adriatic sclerophyllous and mixed forests	Italy, France and Malta		

=== Deserts and Xeric Shrublands ===
WWF ID	Ecoregion (WWF)	Country	Map	Photo
PA1308	Caspian lowland desert	Russia and Kazachstan		

== Global 200 ecoregions in Europe ==
=== Terrestrial ===
Terrestrial Global 200 ecoregions in Europe comprise three regions of Scandia alpine tundra and taiga, which is present in Finland, Norway, Russia and Sweden:

- PA0608 Scandinavian and Russian taiga
- PA1106 Kola Peninsula tundra
- PA1110 Scandinavian montane birch forest and grasslands

Other Global 200 ecoregions:

- PA1214 Mediterranean forests, woodlands, and scrub

=== Freshwater ===
Global 200 Large river delta ecoregions in Europe:

- Volga River Delta (Kazakhstan, Russia)
- Danube Delta (Bulgaria, Moldova, Romania, Ukraine, Yugoslavia)

Small river ecoregions:

- Balkan rivers and streams (Albania, Bosnia and Herzegovina, Bulgaria, Croatia, Greece, Macedonia, Turkey, Yugoslavia)

=== Marine ===
There are no marine Global 200 ecoregions in Europe.

== Sources ==
- "World Wildlife Fund".
- "Global 200". WWF.
