= List of ecoregions in Spain =

The following is a list of ecoregions in Spain, including the Canary Islands, Ceuta, Melilla, and the Plazas de soberanía, according to the Worldwide Fund for Nature (WWF).

== Terrestrial ecoregions ==
=== Mediterranean forests, woodlands, and scrub ===
- Canary Islands dry woodlands and forests (Canary Islands)
- Iberian conifer forests
- Iberian sclerophyllous and semi-deciduous forests
- Mediterranean acacia-argania dry woodlands and succulent thickets (Canary Islands)
- Mediterranean woodlands and forests (Ceuta, Melilla, and Plazas de soberanía)
- Northeastern Spain and Southern France Mediterranean forests
- Northwest Iberian montane forests
- Southeastern Iberian shrubs and woodlands
- Southwest Iberian Mediterranean sclerophyllous and mixed forests

=== Temperate broadleaf and mixed forests ===
- Cantabrian mixed forests
- Pyrenees conifer and mixed forests

== Freshwater ecoregions ==
- Atlantic Northwest Africa (Ceuta, Melilla, and Plazas de soberanía)
- Cantabric Coast - Languedoc
- Eastern Iberia
- Southern Iberia
- Western Iberia

== Marine ecoregions ==
- Alboran Sea
- Azores Canaries Madeira
- South European Atlantic
- Western Mediterranean
