= Mediterranean basin =

Region of lands around the Mediterranean Sea that have a Mediterranean climate

In biogeography, the Mediterranean basin (/ˌmɛdɪtəˈreɪniən/ MED-ih-tə-RAY-nee-ən), also known as the Mediterranean region or sometimes Mediterranea, is the region of lands around the Mediterranean Sea that mostly have a Mediterranean climate, with mild to cool, rainy winters and warm to hot, dry summers, which supports characteristic Mediterranean forests, woodlands, and scrub vegetation.

== Geography ==
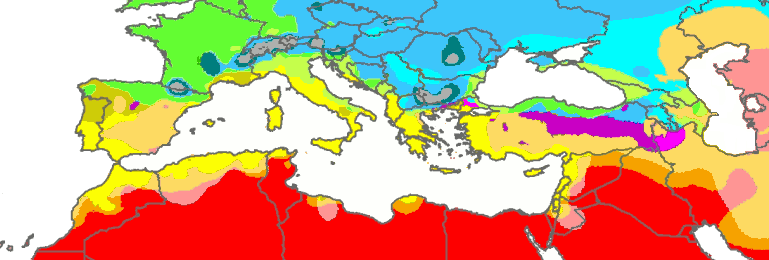
Köppen–Geiger-based map of the areas surrounding the Mediterranean Sea. Based on the work of M. C. Peel, B. L. Finlayson and T. A. McMahon at the University of Melbourne. For a full legend, see Legend of the Köppen–Geiger climate classification on the Wikimedia Commons.: Desert climate; Semi-arid climate; Mediterranean climate; Humid subtropical climate; Oceanic climate; Humid continental climate; Subarctic climate; Tundra

The Mediterranean basin covers portions of three continents: Africa, Asia, and Europe. It is not the same as the drainage basin of the Mediterranean Sea; the drainage basin is larger, as rivers including the Nile and Rhône reach further into Africa and Europe. Conversely, the Mediterranean basin includes regions not in the drainage basin, such as Iraq, Jordan, and Portugal.

It has a varied and contrasting topography. The Mediterranean region offers a varied landscape of high mountains, rocky shores, impenetrable scrub, semi-arid steppes, coastal wetlands, sandy beaches and a myriad of islands of various shapes and sizes dotted amidst the clear blue sea. Contrary to the classic sandy beach images portrayed in most tourist brochures, the Mediterranean is surprisingly hilly. Mountains can be seen from almost anywhere.

By definition, the Mediterranean basin extends from Macaronesia in the west to the Levant in the east, although some places may or may not be included depending on the view, as is the case with Macaronesia: some definitions only include the Canary Islands and Madeira while others include the whole Macaronesia (with the Azores and Cape Verde).

The northern portion of the Maghreb region of north-western Africa has a Mediterranean climate, separated from the Sahara Desert, which extends across North Africa, by the Atlas Mountains. In the eastern Mediterranean, the Sahara extends to the southern shore of the Mediterranean, with the exception of the northern fringe of the peninsula of Cyrenaica in Libya, which has a dry Mediterranean climate.

In West Asia, it covers the western and southern portions of the Anatolian Peninsula, as far as Iraq, but excluding the temperate-climate mountains of central Turkey. It includes the Mediterranean Levant at the eastern end of the Mediterranean, bounded on the east and south by the Negev and Syrian deserts.

Europe lies to the north of the Mediterranean. The European portion of the Mediterranean basin loosely corresponds to Southern Europe. The three large Southern European peninsulas, the Apennine Peninsula, the Balkan Peninsula, and the Iberian Peninsula, extend into and comprise much of the Mediterranean-climate zone. A system of folded mountains, including the Pyrenees dividing Spain from France, the Alps dividing Italy from Central Europe, the Dinaric Alps along the eastern Adriatic, and the Balkan and Rila-Rhodope mountains of the Balkan Peninsula divide the Mediterranean from the temperate climate regions of Central Europe, Eastern Europe, and Northern, North-western, or Western Europe.

== Geology and paleoclimatology ==
The Mediterranean basin was shaped by the ancient collision of the northward-moving African–Arabian continent with the stable Eurasian continent. As Africa–Arabia moved north, it closed the former Tethys Sea, which formerly separated Eurasia from the ancient super continent of Gondwana, of which Africa was part. At about the same time, 170 mya in the Jurassic period, a small Neotethys ocean basin formed shortly before the Tethys Sea was closed at the eastern end. The collision pushed up a vast system of mountains, extending from the Pyrenees in Spain to the Zagros Mountains in Iran. This episode of mountain building, known as the Alpine orogeny, occurred mostly during the Oligocene (34 to 23 million years ago (mya)) and Miocene (23 to 5.3 mya) epochs. The Neotethys became larger during these collisions and associated folding and subduction.

About 6 mya during the late Miocene, the Mediterranean was closed at its western end by drifting Africa, which caused the entire sea to evaporate. There followed several (debated) episodes of sea drawdown and re-flooding known as the Messinian Salinity Crisis, which ended when the Atlantic last re-flooded the basin at the end of the Miocene. Recent research has suggested that a desiccation-flooding cycle may have repeated several times during the last 630,000 years of the Miocene epoch, which could explain several events of large amounts of salt deposition. Recent studies, however, show that repeated desiccation and re-flooding is unlikely from a geodynamic point of view.

The end of the Miocene also marked a change in the Mediterranean basin's climate. Fossil evidence shows that the Mediterranean basin had a relatively humid subtropical climate with summer rainfall during the Miocene, which supported laurel forests. The shift to a Mediterranean climate occurred within the last 3.2–2.8 million years, during the Pliocene epoch, as summer rainfall decreased. The subtropical laurel forests retreated, although they persisted on the islands of Macaronesia off the Atlantic coast of Iberia and North Africa, and the present Mediterranean vegetation evolved, dominated by coniferous trees and sclerophyllous trees and shrubs, with small, hard, waxy leaves that prevent moisture loss in the dry summers. Much of these forests and shrublands have been altered beyond recognition by thousands of years of human habitation. There are now very few relatively intact natural areas in what was once a heavily wooded region.

== Flora and fauna ==
Phytogeographically, the Mediterranean basin together with the nearby Atlantic coast, the Mediterranean woodlands and forests and Mediterranean dry woodlands and steppe of North Africa, the Black Sea coast of northeastern Anatolia, the southern coast of Crimea between Sevastopol and Feodosiya in Ukraine and the Black Sea coast between Anapa and Tuapse in Russia forms the Mediterranean floristic region, which belongs to the Tethyan Subkingdom of the Boreal Kingdom and is enclosed between the Circumboreal, Irano-Turanian, Saharo-Arabian and Macaronesian floristic regions.

The Mediterranean region was first proposed by German botanist August Grisebach in the late 19th century.

The Mediterranean basin is a hotspot of plant diversity with many endemic species. The genera Aubrieta, Sesamoides, Cynara, Dracunculus, Arisarum and Biarum are nearly endemic. Among the endemic species prominent in the Mediterranean vegetation are the Aleppo pine, stone pine, Mediterranean cypress, bay laurel, Oriental sweetgum, holm oak, kermes oak, strawberry tree, Greek strawberry tree, mastic, terebinth, common myrtle, oleander, Acanthus mollis and Vitex agnus-castus. Moreover, many plant taxa are shared with one of the four neighbouring floristic regions only. According to different versions of Armen Takhtajan's delineation, the Mediterranean region is further subdivided into seven to nine floristic provinces: Southwestern Mediterranean (or Southern Moroccan and Southwestern Mediterranean), Ibero-Balearian (or Iberian and Balearian), Liguro-Tyrrhenian, Adriatic, East Mediterranean, South Mediterranean and Crimeo-Novorossiysk.

The Mediterranean basin is the largest of the world's five Mediterranean forests, woodlands, and scrub regions. It is home to a number of plant communities, which vary with rainfall, elevation, latitude, and soil.

- Scrublands occur in the driest areas, especially areas near the seacoast where wind and salt spray are frequent. Low, soft-leaved scrublands around the Mediterranean are known as garrigar in Catalan, garrigue in French, phrygana in Greek, tomillares in Spanish, and batha in Hebrew.
- Shrublands are dense thickets of evergreen sclerophyll shrubs and small trees and are the most common plant community around the Mediterranean. Mediterranean shrublands are known as màquia in Catalan, macchia in Italian, maquis in French, and "matorral" in Spanish. In some places, shrublands are the mature vegetation type, and in other places the result of the degradation of former forest or woodland by logging or overgrazing, or disturbance by major fires.
- Savannas and grasslands occur around the Mediterranean, usually dominated by annual grasses.
- Woodlands are usually dominated by oak and pine, mixed with other sclerophyll and coniferous trees.
- Forests are distinct from woodlands in having a closed canopy, and occur in the areas of highest rainfall and in riparian zones along rivers and streams where they receive summer water. Mediterranean forests are generally composed of evergreen trees, predominantly oak and pine. At higher elevations Mediterranean forests transition to mixed broadleaf and tall conifer forests similar to temperate zone forests.

The Mediterranean basin is home to considerable biodiversity, including 22,500 endemic vascular plant species. Conservation International designates the region as a biodiversity hotspot, because of its rich biodiversity and its threatened status. The Mediterranean basin has an area of 2,085,292 km^{2}, of which only 98,009 km^{2} remains undisturbed.

Endangered mammals of the Mediterranean basin include the Mediterranean monk seal, the Barbary macaque, and the Iberian lynx.

== Ecoregions ==
The WWF identifies 22 Mediterranean forests, woodlands, and scrub ecoregions in the Mediterranean basin, most of which feature sclerophyll plant species:

- Aegean and Western Turkey sclerophyllous and mixed forests (Greece, Turkey, North Macedonia, Bulgaria)
- Anatolian conifer and deciduous mixed forests (Turkey)
- Canary Islands dry woodlands and forests (Spain)
- Corsican montane broadleaf and mixed forests (France)
- Crete Mediterranean forests (Greece)
- Cyprus Mediterranean forests (Cyprus)
- Eastern Mediterranean conifer–sclerophyllous–broadleaf forests (Lebanon, Iraq, Israel, Jordan, Palestine, Syria, Turkey)
- Iberian conifer forests (Spain)
- Iberian sclerophyllous and semi-deciduous forests (Portugal, Spain)
- Illyrian deciduous forests (Albania, Bosnia and Herzegovina, Croatia, Greece, Italy, Montenegro, Slovenia)
- Italian sclerophyllous and semi-deciduous forests (France, Italy, San Marino)
- Mediterranean acacia–argania dry woodlands (Western Sahara, Morocco, Canary Islands (Spain))
- Mediterranean dry woodlands and steppe (Algeria, Egypt, Libya, Morocco, Tunisia)
- Mediterranean woodlands and forests (Algeria, Libya, Morocco, Tunisia)
- Northeastern Spain and Southern France Mediterranean forests (France, Monaco, Spain)
- Northwest Iberian montane forests (Portugal, Spain)
- Pindus Mountains mixed forests (Albania, Greece, Kosovo, North Macedonia)
- South Apennine mixed montane forests (Italy)
- Southeastern Iberian shrubs and woodlands (Spain)
- Southern Anatolian montane conifer and deciduous forests (Lebanon, Israel, Jordan, Syria, Turkey)
- Southwest Iberian Mediterranean sclerophyllous and mixed forests (Portugal, Spain)
- Tyrrhenian–Adriatic sclerophyllous and mixed forests (Croatia, France, Italy, Malta)

Map of the Mediterranean basin's ecoregions. 1201: Aegean and Western Turkey sclerophyllous and mixed forests. 1202: Anatolian conifer and deciduous mixed forests. 1203: Canary Islands dry woodlands and forests. 1204: Corsican montane broadleaf and mixed forests. 1205: Crete Mediterranean forests. 1206: Cyprus Mediterranean forests. 1207: Eastern Mediterranean conifer-sclerophyllous-broadleaf forests. 1208: Iberian conifer forests. 1209: Iberian sclerophyllous and semi-deciduous forests. 1210: Illyrian deciduous forests. 1211: Italian sclerophyllous and semi-deciduous forests. 1212: Mediterranean acacia-argania dry woodlands and succulent thickets. 1213: Mediterranean dry woodlands and steppe. 1214: Mediterranean woodlands and forests. 1215: Northeastern Spain and Southern France Mediterranean forests. 1216: Northwest Iberian montane forests. 1217: Pindus Mountains mixed forests. 1218: South Apeninne mixed montane forests. 1219: Southeastern Iberian shrubs and woodlands. 1220: Southern Anatolian montane conifer and deciduous forests. 1221: Southwest Iberian Mediterranean sclerophyllous and mixed forests. 1222: Tyrrhenian-Adriatic sclerophyllous and mixed forests.

== History ==
Neanderthals inhabited western Asia and the non-glaciated portions of Europe starting about 230,000 years ago. Modern humans moved into western Asia from Africa less than 100,000 years ago. Modern humans, known as Cro-Magnons, moved into Europe approximately 50–40,000 years ago.

The most recent glacial period, the Wisconsin glaciation (Würm in Southern European contexts), reached its maximum extent approximately 21,000 years ago, and ended approximately 12,000 years ago. A warm period, known as the Holocene climatic optimum, followed the ice age.

Food crops, including wheat, chickpeas, and olives, along with sheep and goats, were domesticated in the eastern Mediterranean in the 9th millennium BCE, which allowed for the establishment of agricultural settlements. Near Eastern crops spread to southeastern Europe in the 7th millennium BCE. Poppy and oats were domesticated in Europe from the 6th to the 3rd millennium BCE. Agricultural settlements spread around the Mediterranean basin. Megaliths were constructed in Europe from 4500 – 1500 BCE.

A strengthening of the summer monsoon 9000–7000 years ago increased rainfall across the Sahara, which became a grassland, with lakes, rivers, and wetlands. After a period of climatic instability, the Sahara settled into a desert state by the 4th millennium BCE.

=== Historiography ===
One of the earliest modern studies of the Mediterranean was Fernand Braudel's La Méditerranéee et le monde méditerranéen à l époque de Philippe II (The Mediterranean and the Mediterranean World in the Age of Philip II), published in 1949. S.D. Goitein's multivolume study of the Cairo Geniza documents was another important contribution in the area of Mediterranean Jewish culture.

== Agriculture ==
Wheat is the dominant grain grown around the Mediterranean basin. The characteristic tree crop is the olive; and the grape, for wine, completes the "trinity" of basic ingredients of traditional Mediterranean cuisine.

The Arab Agricultural Revolution brought a new combination of foods to Portugal, Spain, and Sicily in the Middle Ages. Those foods included aubergines, spinach, sugar cane, rice, apricots, and citrus fruits. The Columbian Exchange in the early modern period added the tomato and the haricot bean.

== See also ==
- Ancient Egypt
- Ancient Greece
- Ancient Rome
- Indo-Mediterranean
- Life zones of the Mediterranean region
- Mediterranean wine climate
- Mistrals
- Ottoman Empire
- Phoenicia
- Zanclean flood
