= Alps conifer and mixed forests =

Ecoregion in Central Europe

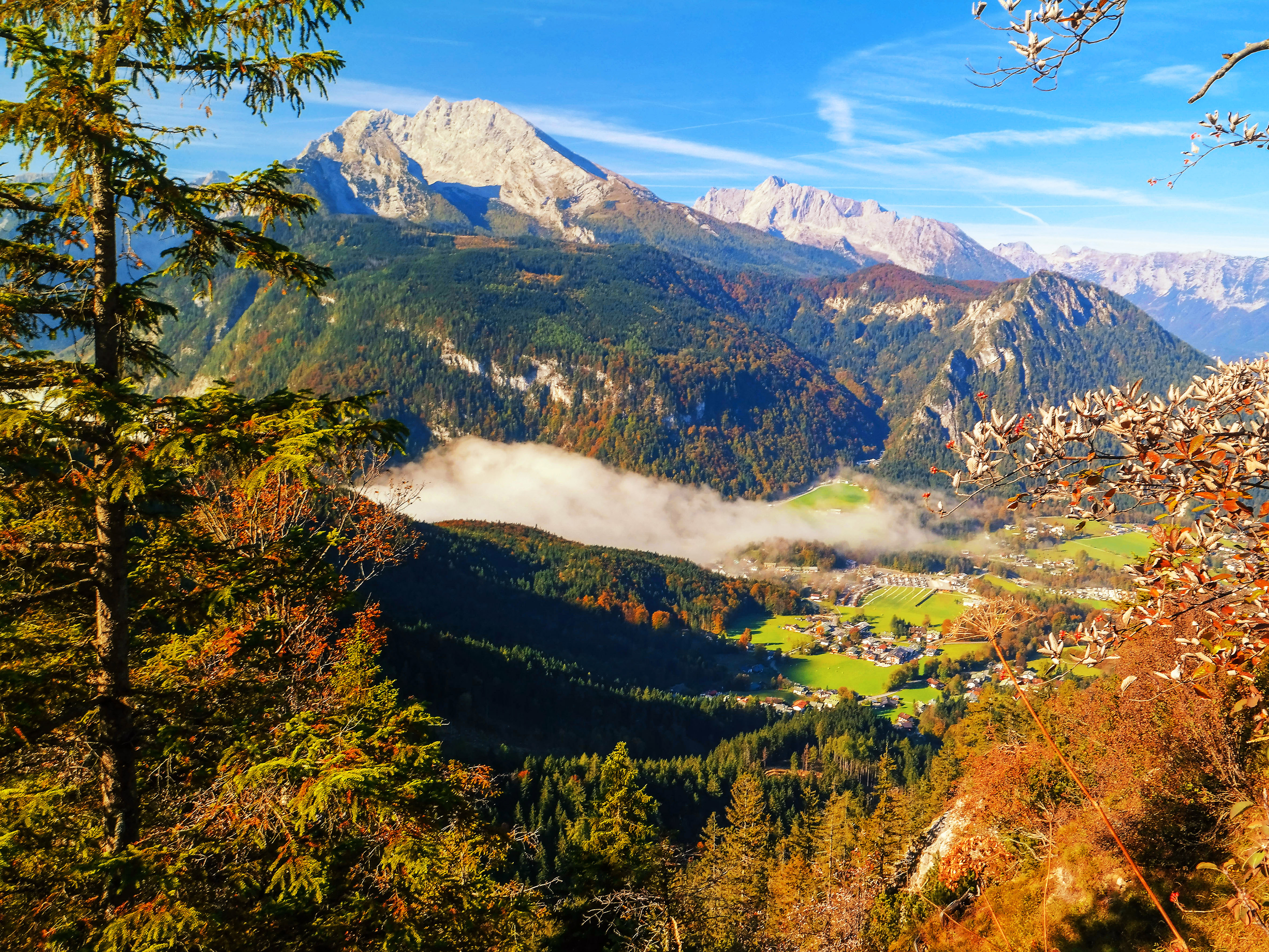
- Berchtesgaden National Park

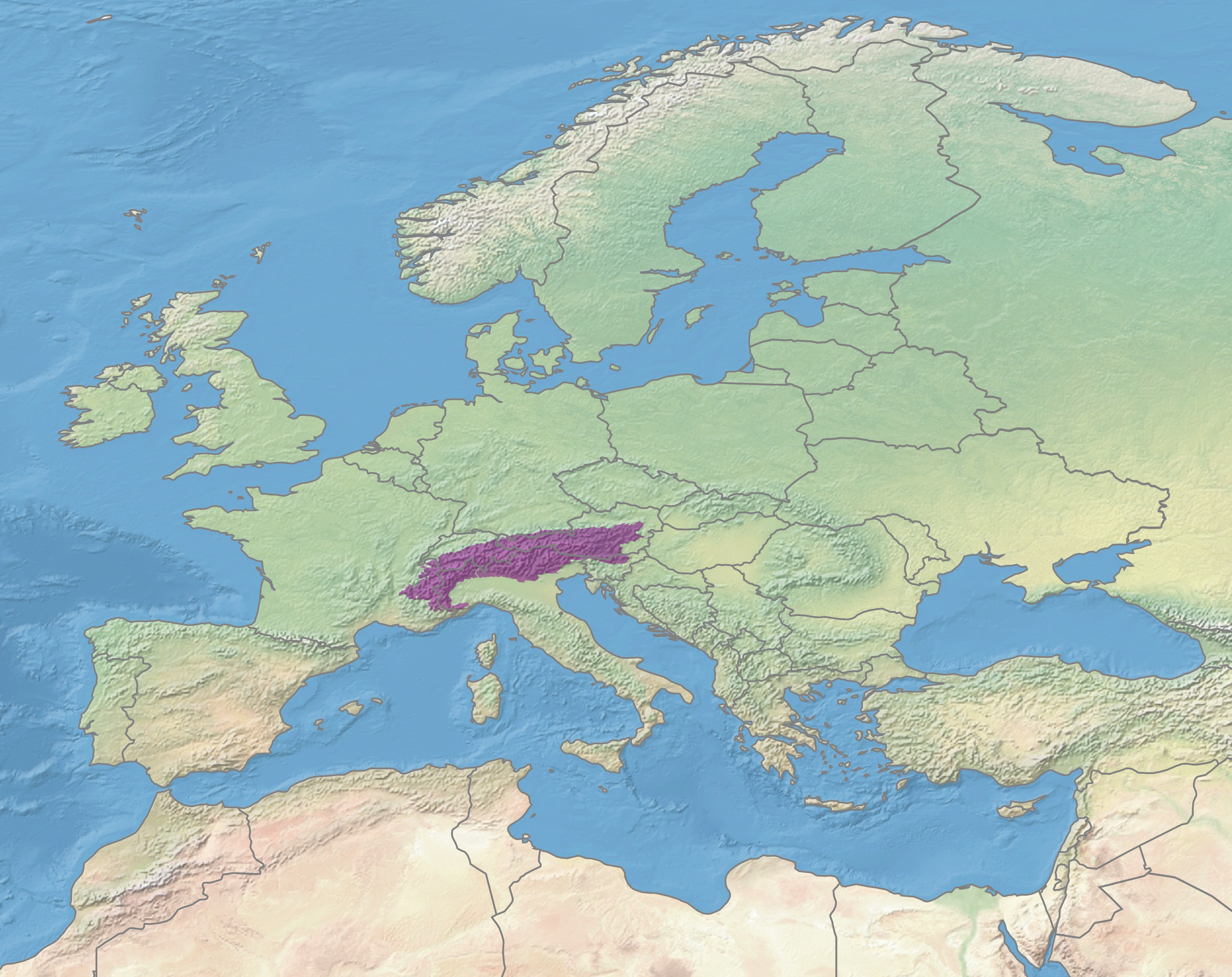
- Alps conifer and mixed forests highlighted in purple

Ecology
- Realm: Palearctic
- Biome: temperate coniferous forests
- Borders: List: Dinaric Mountains mixed forests; Italian sclerophyllous and semi-deciduous forests; Northeast Spain and Southern France Mediterranean forests; Pannonian mixed forests; Po Basin mixed forests; Western European broadleaf forests

Geography
- Area: 149,872 km^{2} (57,866 sq mi)
- Countries: List: Austria; France; Germany; Italy; Liechtenstein; Slovenia; Switzerland

Conservation
- Conservation status: Vulnerable
- Global 200: European-Mediterranean montane mixed forest
- Protected: 40,470 km^{2} (27%)

The Alps conifer and mixed forests is a temperate coniferous forest ecoregion in central Europe. It extends along the Alps mountains through portions of France, Italy, Switzerland, Germany, Liechtenstein, Austria, and Slovenia. The ecoregion extends from the lower slopes of the Alps to its peaks, which include Mont Blanc, at 4,809 m (15,778 ft) the highest peak in the Alps.

The Alps forests are at the transition between the Mediterranean climate regions of southern Europe and the more humid and temperate Euro-Siberian region of western, central, and northern Europe.

== Flora ==
The ecoregion's elevational range, and its central location between Europe's climatic regions, support a variety of plant communities and species. The ecoregion has 4,500 native vascular plant species, including 400 endemic species.

The forests on the lower slopes are mostly deciduous broadleaf trees, including the oaks Quercus robur, Quercus petraea, Quercus pubescens. Broadleaf sclerophyllous evergreen trees are found in southern valleys adjacent to Mediterranean-climate regions.

Montane forests include a mix of conifers Norway spruce (Picea abies), Silver fir (Abies alba), and mountain pine (Pinus mugo), with the broadleaf deciduous European beech (Fagus sylvatica), aspen (Populus tremula), silver birch (Betula pendula) and downy birch (Betula pubescens). In more continental-climate parts of the range, European larch (Larix decidua), arolla pine (Pinus cembra), and Scots pine (Pinus sylvestris) replace Pinus mugo. Scots pine and Pinus mugo can form a hybrid pine Pinus × rhaetica. Black pine (Pinus nigra) occurs on some south facing slopes in the eastern part of the range.

Subalpine and alpine plant communities including heath and alpine tundra occur above the timberline, and include many endemic species.

== Fauna ==
The Alps are home to 80 species of mammals. Large mammals include Eurasian brown bear (Ursus arctos), Alpine ibex (Capra ibex), Alpine chamois (Rupicapra rupicapra rupicapra), Eurasian lynx (Lynx lynx), wolf (Canis lupus), wild boar (Sus scrofa), red deer (Cervus elaphus elaphus), and roe deer (Capreolus capreolus).

The Alps are home to 200 species of birds, including lammergeier (Gypaetus barbatus), western capercaillie (Tetrao urogallus crassirostris) and rock ptarmigan (Lagopus muta).

== Protected areas ==
40,470 km^{2}, or 27%, of the ecoregion is in protected areas. One-third of the unprotected area is still forested. Protected areas include Ecrins National Park, Mercantour National Park, Vanoise National Park, and Queyras Regional Nature Park in France, Gran Paradiso National Park and Dolomiti Bellunesi National Park in Italy, Gruyère Pays-d'Enhault Regional Nature Park in Switzerland, Berchtesgaden National Park in Germany, and Kalkalpen National Park and Gesäuse National Park in Austria.
