= Kola Peninsula tundra =

Ecoregion in Arctic Ocean

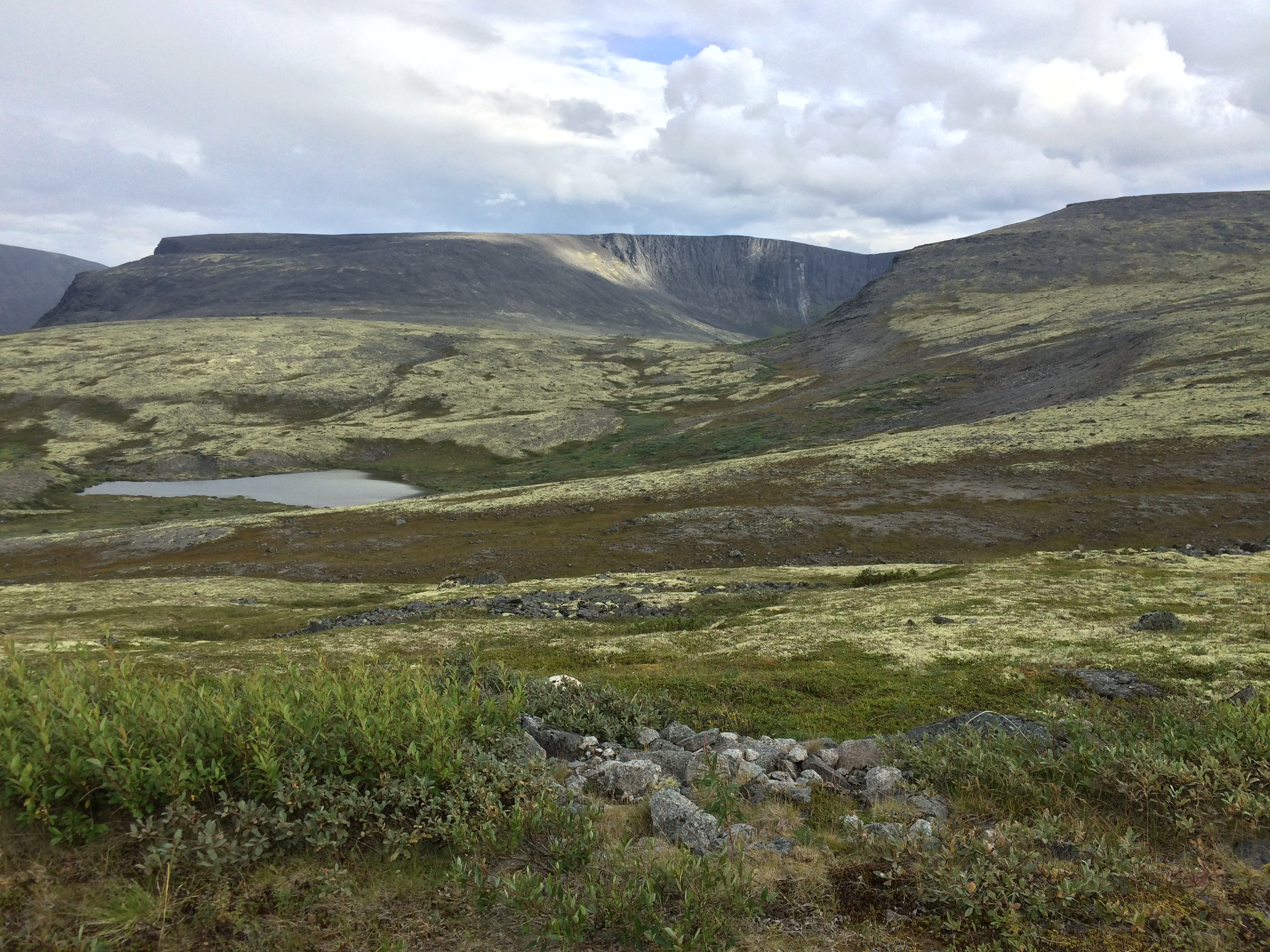
- Lovozero Massif, in the middle of the Kola Peninsula

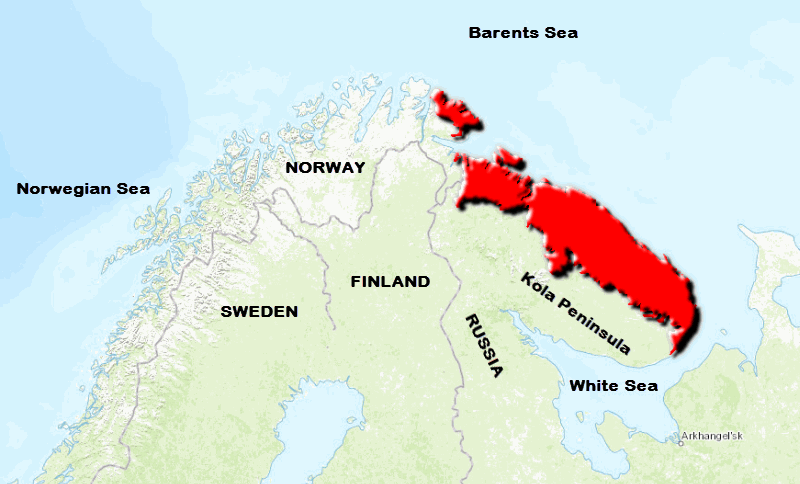
- Ecoregion territory (in red)

Ecology
- Realm: Palearctic
- Biome: Tundra

Geography
- Area: 58,793 km^{2} (22,700 sq mi)
- Countries: Russia; Norway
- Coordinates: 68.25°N 35.75°E

The Kola Peninsula tundra ecoregion (WWF ID: PA1106) is an ecoregion that covers the northeastern half of the Kola Peninsula, along the coast of the White Sea, a marginal sea of the Arctic Ocean. The maritime effects of the White Sea create a milder climate than would be expected for a region of this latitude. It is in the Palearctic realm, and the tundra biome. It has an area of 58,793 square kilometres (22,700 sq mi).

== Location and description ==
The northernmost segments of this ecoregion are on the northern coast of Fennoscandia, facing the Barents Sea. The more southerly regions are the northeastern edge of the Kola Peninsula, facing the White Sea.

== Climate ==
The region has a Humid continental climate - cool summer subtype (Koppen classification Dfc). This climate is characterized by high variation in temperature, both daily and seasonally; with long, cold winters and short, cool summers with no averaging over 22 °C (72 °F). Mean precipitation is about 512 mm/year. The mean temperature at the center of the ecoregion is −12.2 °C (10.0 °F) in January, and 12.7 °C (54.9 °F) in July.

== Flora and fauna ==
The cold climate and northerly latitude puts much of the region above the arctic treeline, with trees limited or sparse. The flora is primarily mosses, lichens and shrubs. Among the shrubs are the dwarf birch (Betula nana) and the Camemoro (Rubus chamaemorus). Large mammals of the area include herds of reindeer, which migrate into the tundra in Spring from the boreal forests to the south.

== Protections ==
Over 7% of the ecoregion is in an officially protected area, including all or a portion of:

- Kandalaksha Nature Reserve
- Varangerhalvøya National Park
