= Southwest Iberian Mediterranean sclerophyllous and mixed forests =

Terrestrial ecoregion in Portugal and Spain

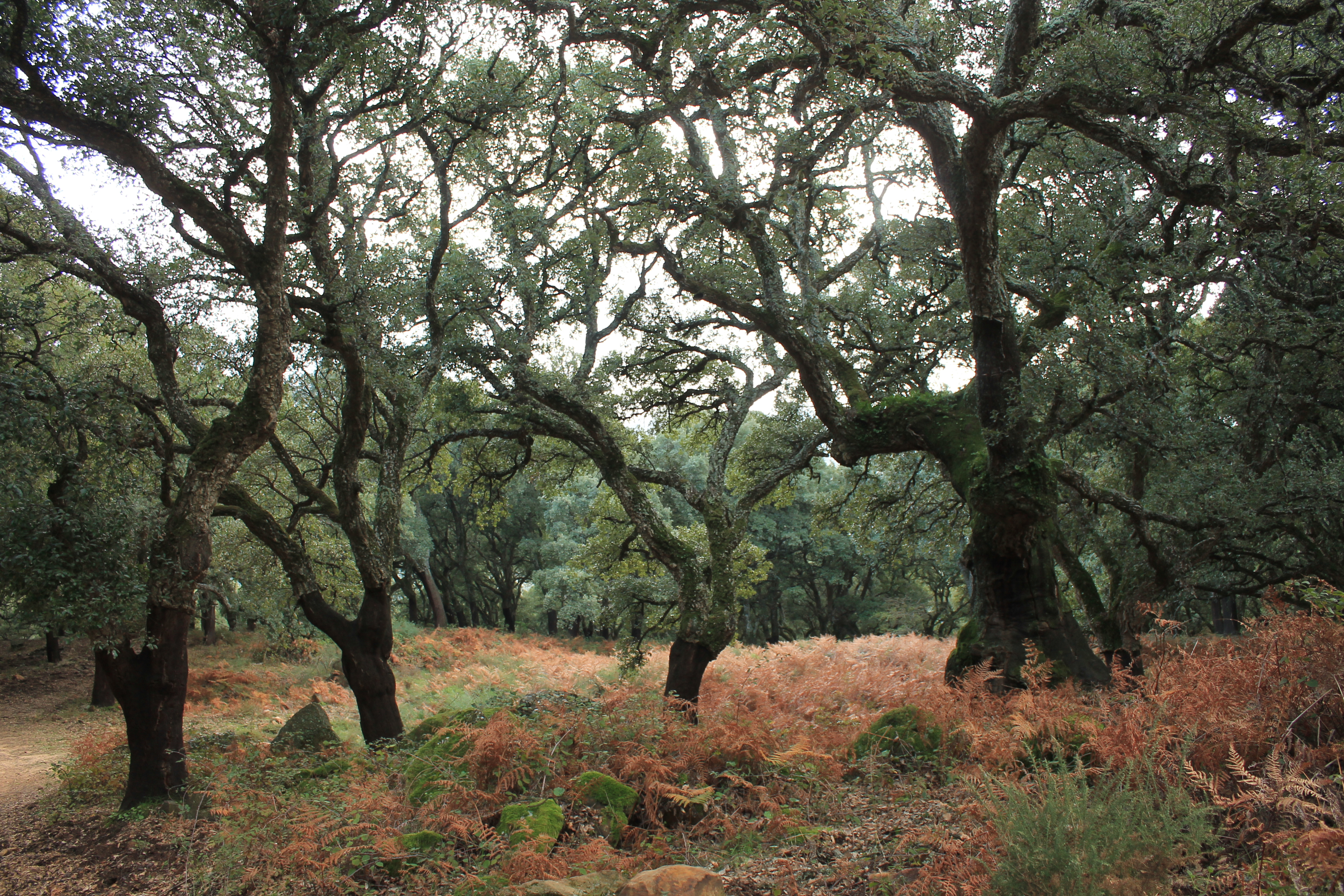
- Cork oaks in Los Alcornocales Natural Park

- Location of the ecoregion (in purple)

Ecology
- Realm: Palearctic
- Biome: Mediterranean forests, woodlands, and scrub
- Borders: Cantabrian mixed forests; Iberian sclerophyllous and semi-deciduous forests; Northwest Iberian montane forests

Geography
- Area: 70,407 km^{2} (27,184 mi^{2})
- Countries: Spain; Portugal
- Regions of Portugal and autonomous communities of Spain: Centro; Lisboa; Alentejo; and Algarve (Portugal); Andalucia, Extremadura (Spain)

Conservation
- Conservation status: critical/endangered
- Protected: 14,761 km^{2} (21%)

The Southwest Iberian Mediterranean sclerophyllous and mixed forests is a Mediterranean forests, woodlands, and scrub ecoregion in southwestern Europe. It occupies the southwestern Iberian Peninsula, encompassing coastal lowlands and mountains in portions of Portugal and Spain.

The ecoregion has a Mediterranean climate, moderated by the influence of the Atlantic Ocean. Summer temperatures tend to be cooler than other Mediterranean climate regions, and winter frosts are rare below 1500 metres.

== Geography ==
The ecoregion occupies the coastal lowlands and hills in Portugal and southwestern Spain, including the lower basins of the Tagus, Guadiana, and Guadalquivir rivers. The city of Lisbon is at the mouth of the Tagus, and the cities of Seville and Córdoba lie in the valley of the Guadalquivir. Other cities in the ecoregion include Cádiz on the Atlantic, and Málaga on the Alboran Sea.

The ecoregion is bounded on the east by the Iberian sclerophyllous and semi-deciduous forests, which occupies most of interior Spain and Portugal's interior southeast. In northern coastal Portugal, the ecoregion is bounded on the north by the more humid and temperate Cantabrian mixed forests. To the northeast is the Northwest Iberian montane forests ecoregion.

== Flora ==
The ecoregion's plant communities include:

- Evergreen oak forests, with cork oak (Quercus suber) and holm oak (Quercus rotundifolia) as the predominant canopy trees, and an evergreen understory of low trees and high shrubs that include Laurus nobilis, Arbutus unedo, Erica arborea, Erica scoparia, Ilex aquifolium, Phillyrea latifolia, Phillyrea angustifolia, Viburnum tinus, Cytisus villosus, and Myrtus communis.
- Open-canopied oak woodland with an understory of shrubs, or savanna with an understory of Cistus ladanifer and other low shrubs and grasses, are common, and typically as a result of human disturbance (see next section).
- Evergreen woodlands and maquis (high shrublands), characterized by wild olive (Olea europaea) and carob (Ceratonia siliqua), with Chamaerops humilis, Pistacia lentiscus, Phillyrea latifolia, P. angustifolia, and Myrtus communis.
- low shrubland, known in Portugal as mato, dominated by Cistus ladanifer, alone or with Ulex argenteus, Genista hirsuta, and Lavandula stoechas. Cistus shrubland is common in areas of poor soil, and areas disturbed by fire, timber harvesting, and clearance for agriculture or pasture. Cistus is pyrophitic, and relies on fire to germinate its seeds and remove competing trees and shrubs. Natural edaphic shrublands also occur on special soil types, including serra on acidic soils, barrocal on limestone soils, and litoral shrublands on the seacoast.
- Woodlands of stone pine (Pinus pinea) grow near the coast on sandy soils and stabilized dunes.
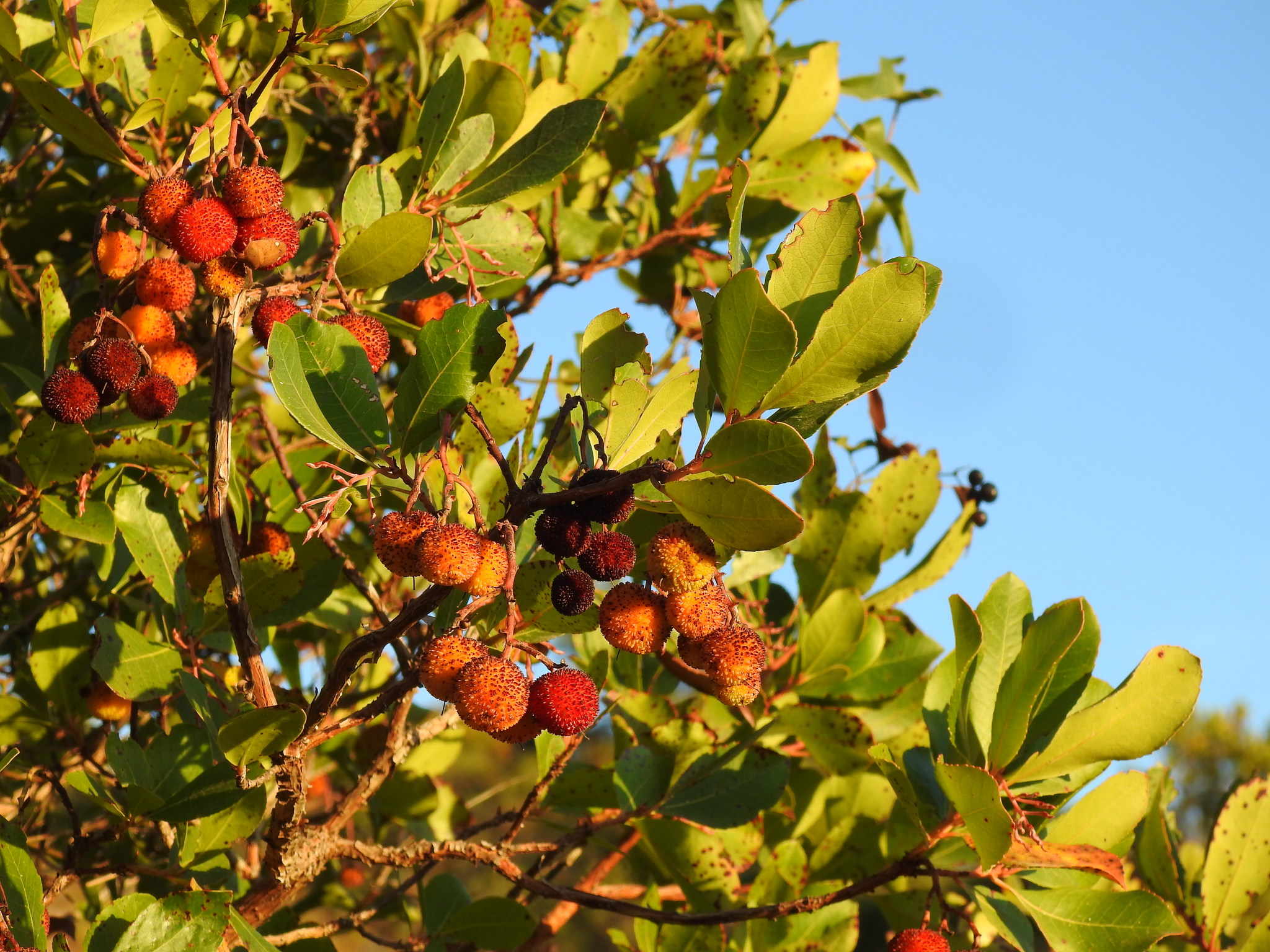
Arbutus unedo in Faro, Portugal

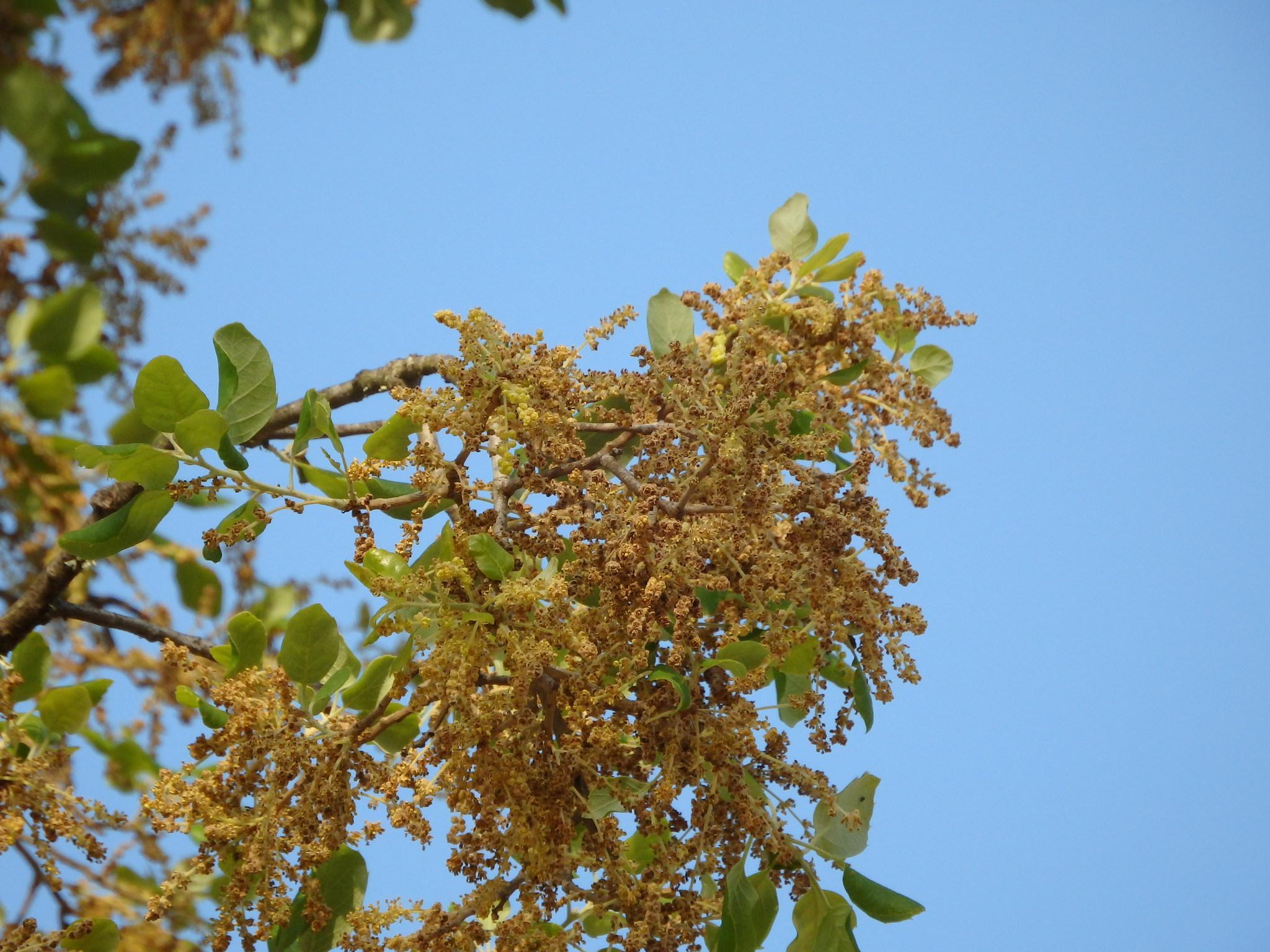
Quercus suber in Faro, Portugal

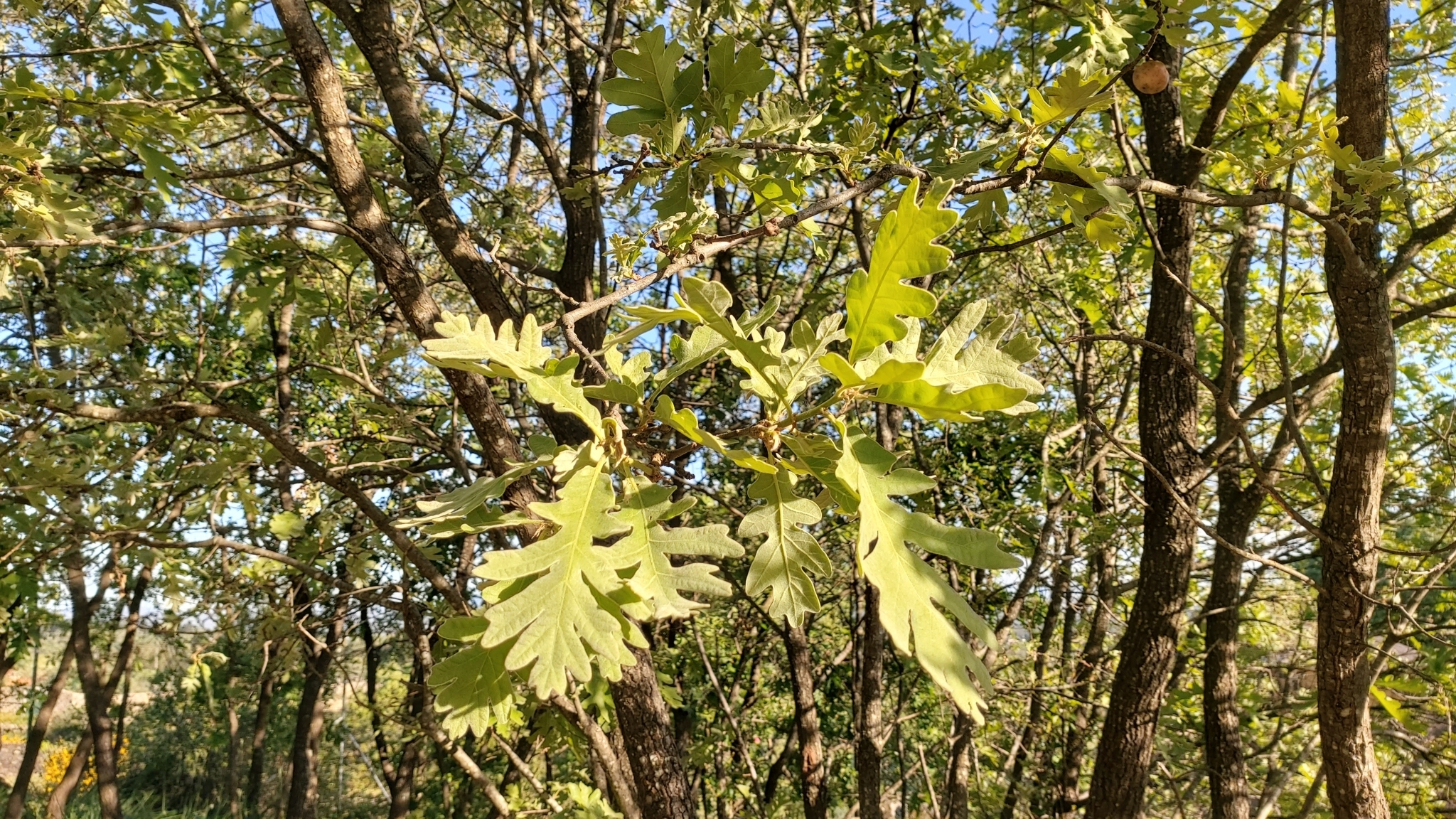
Quercus pyrenaica in Castelo Branco, Portugal

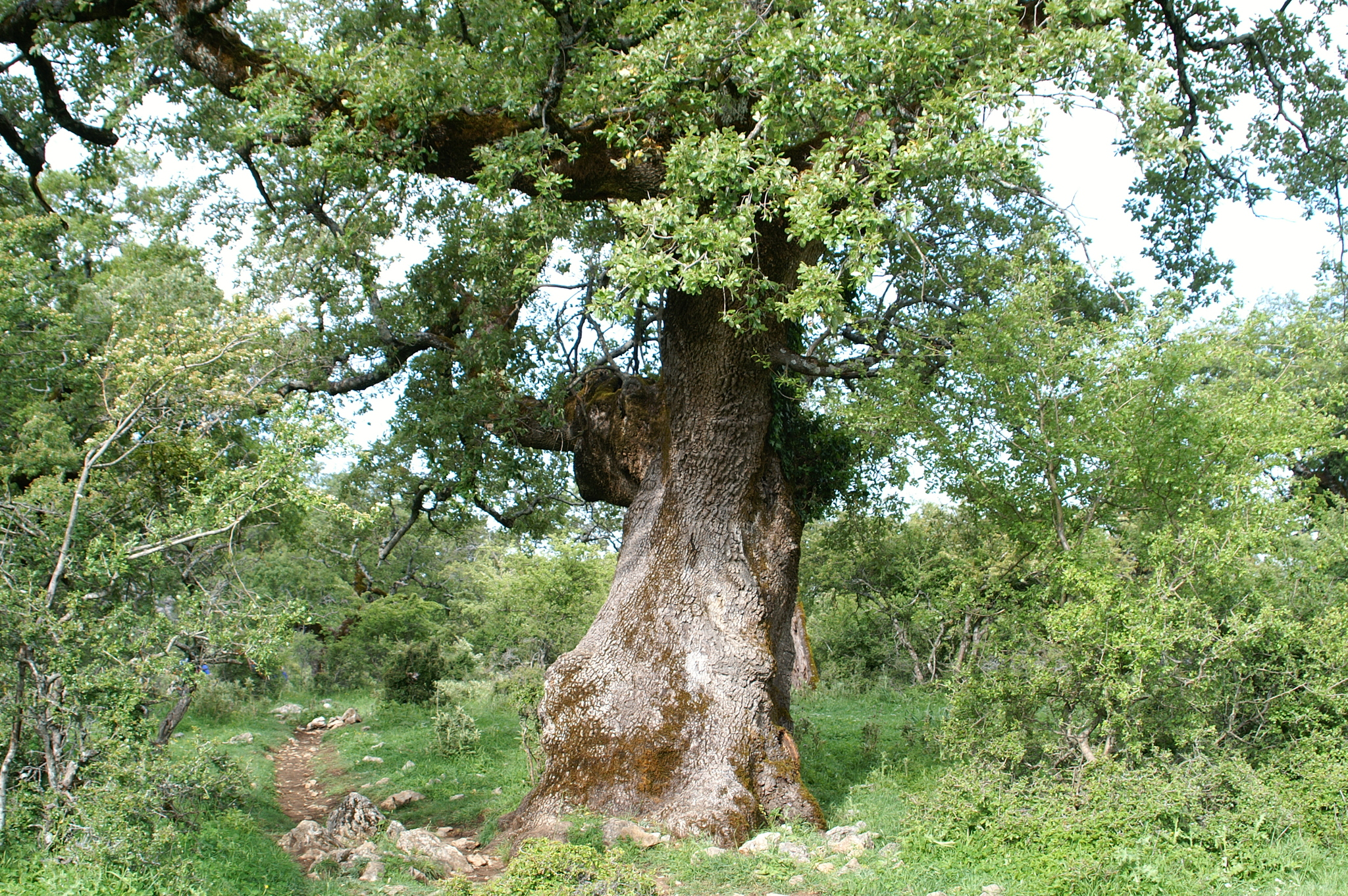
Quercus rotundifolia in Cádiz, Spain

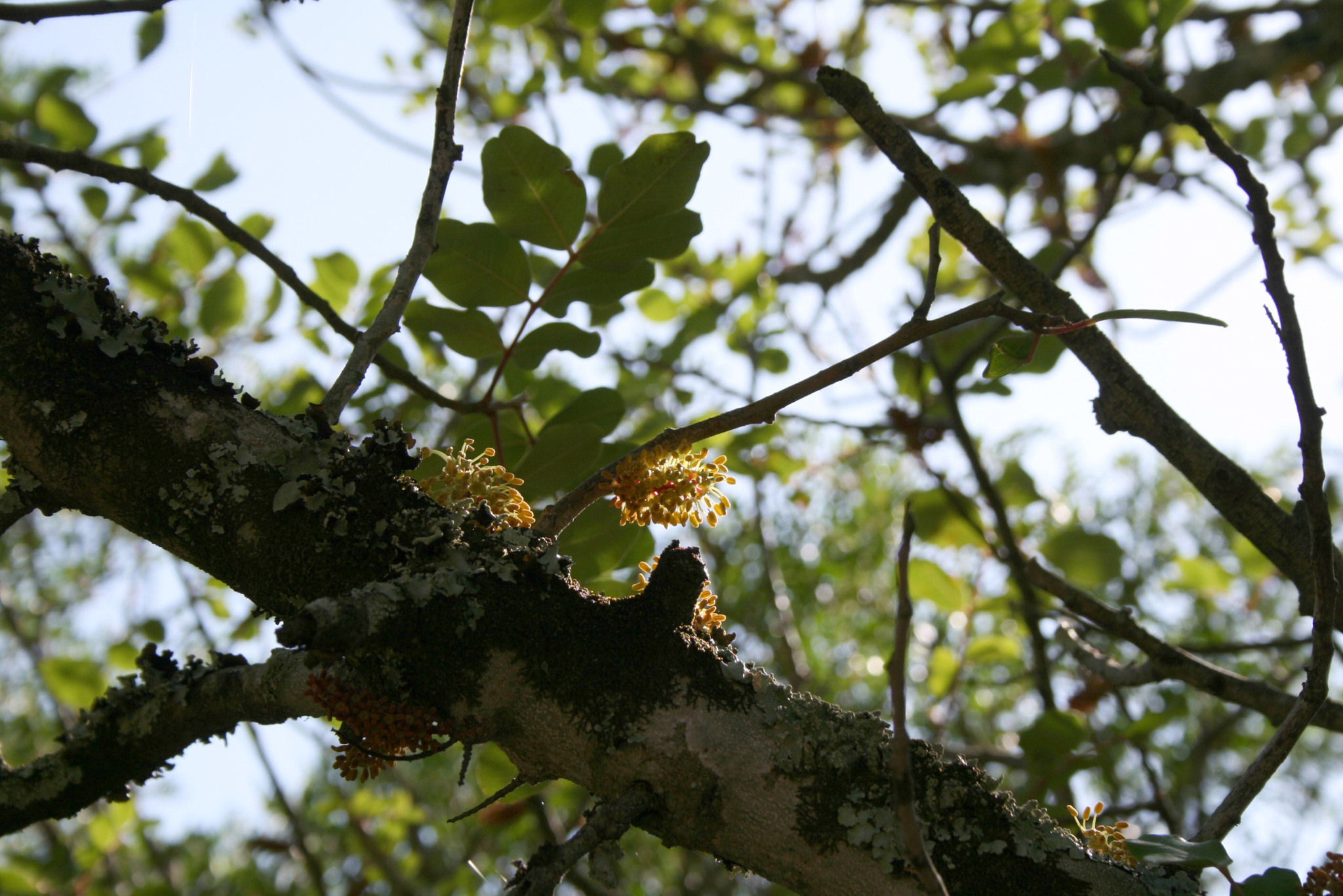
Ceratonia siliqua in Cádiz, Spain

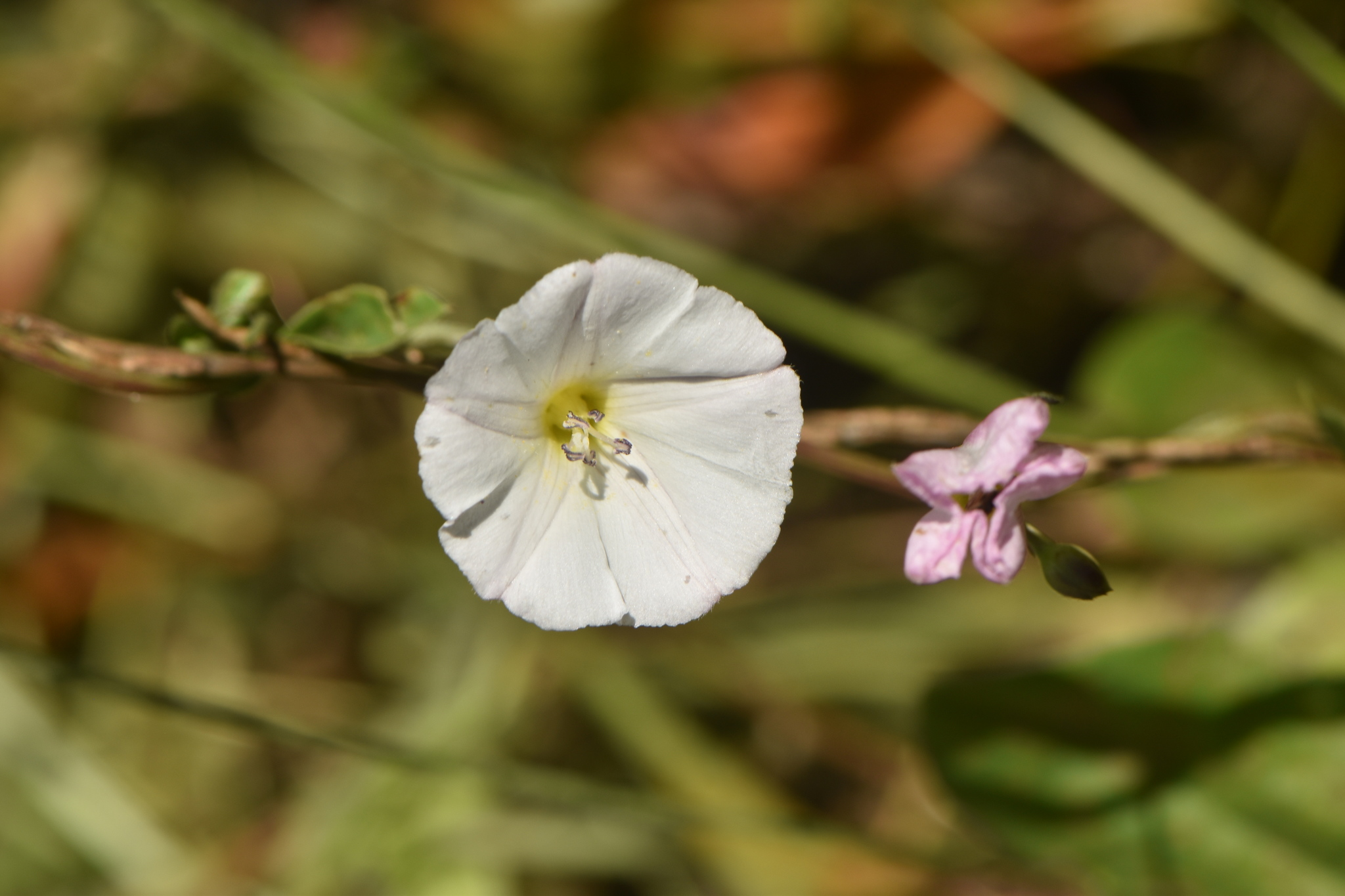
Convolvulus arvensis in Álora, Spain

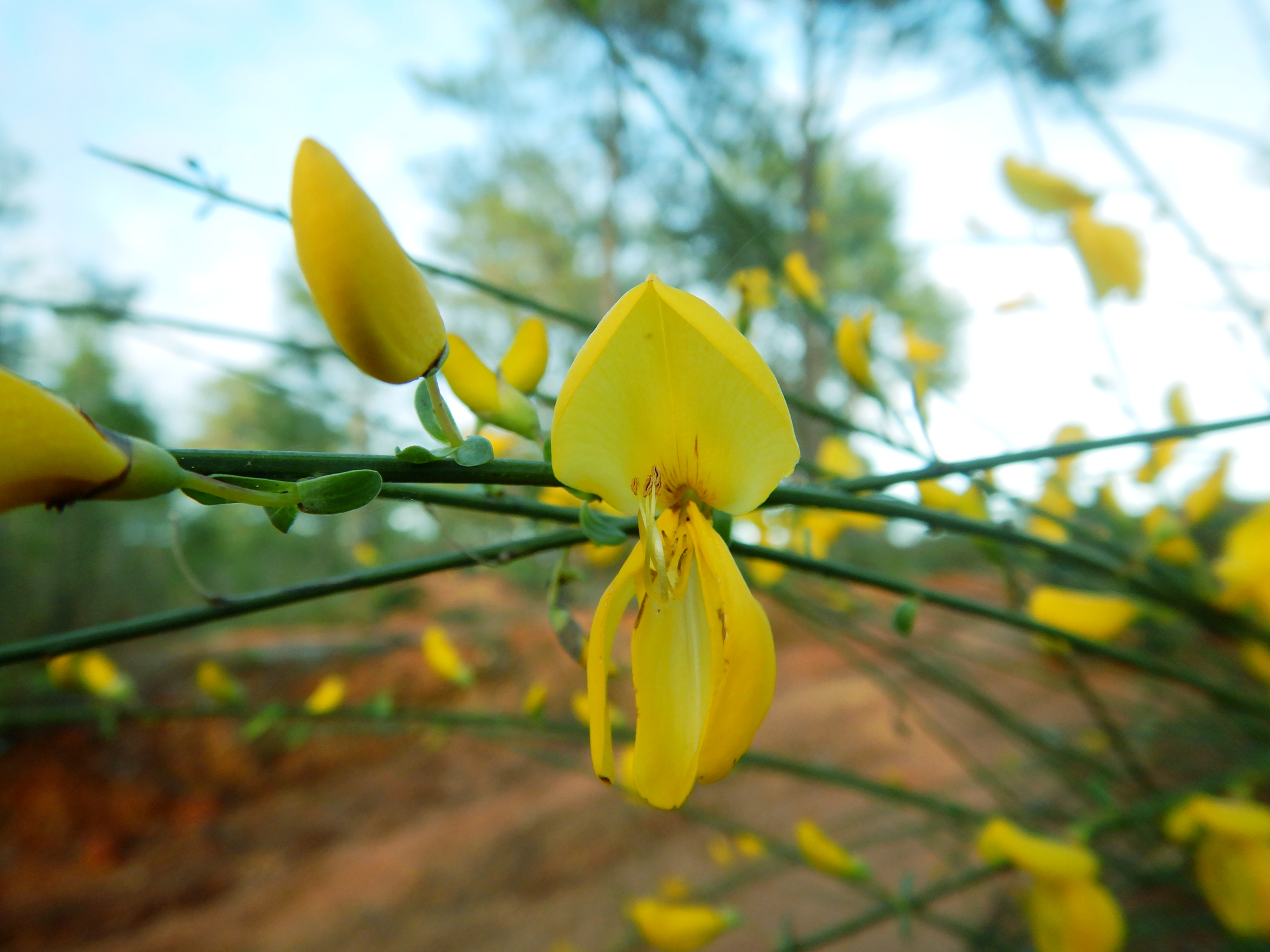
Cytisus grandiflorus in Loulé, Portugal

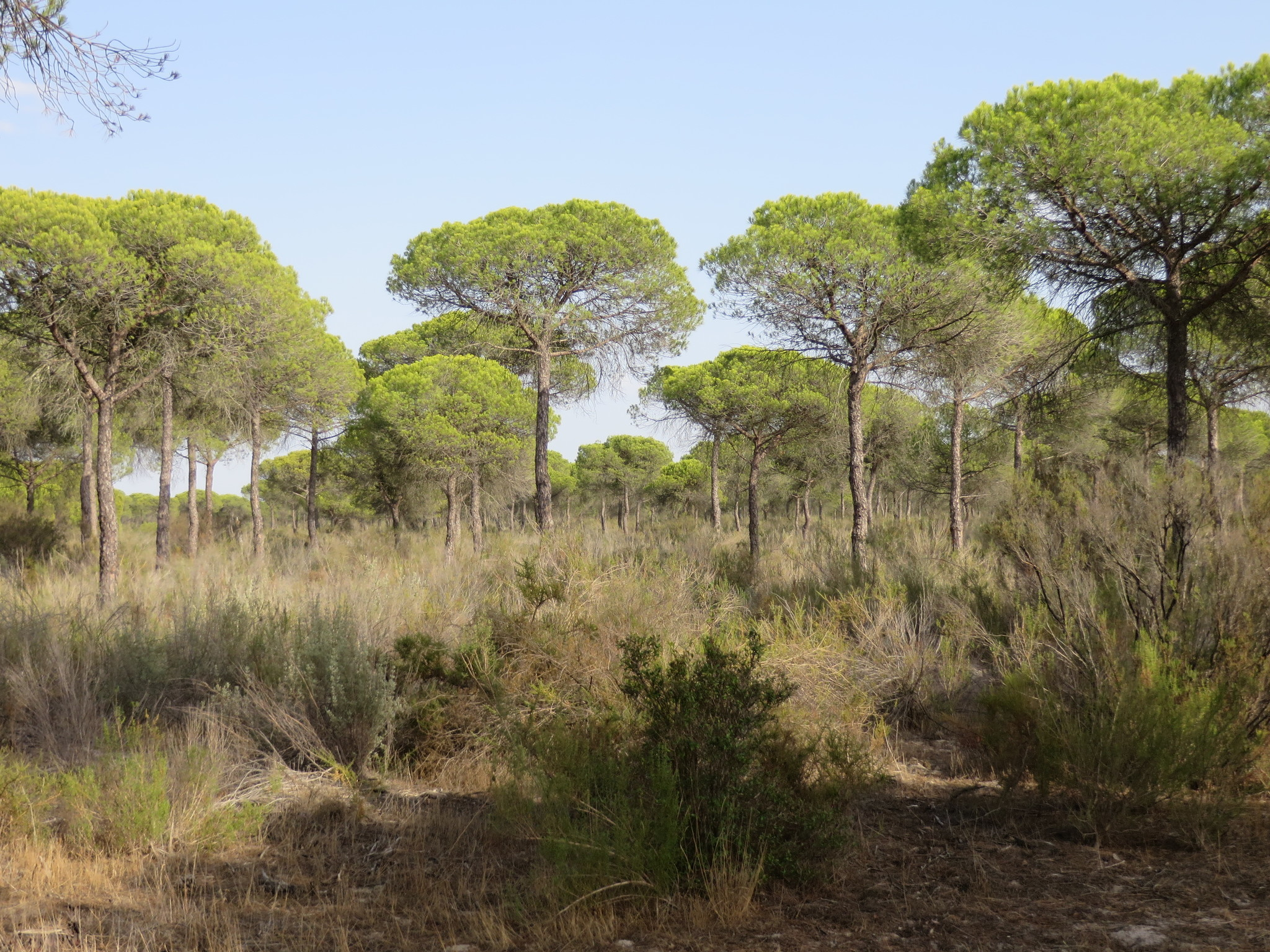
Pinus pinea in Huelva, Spain

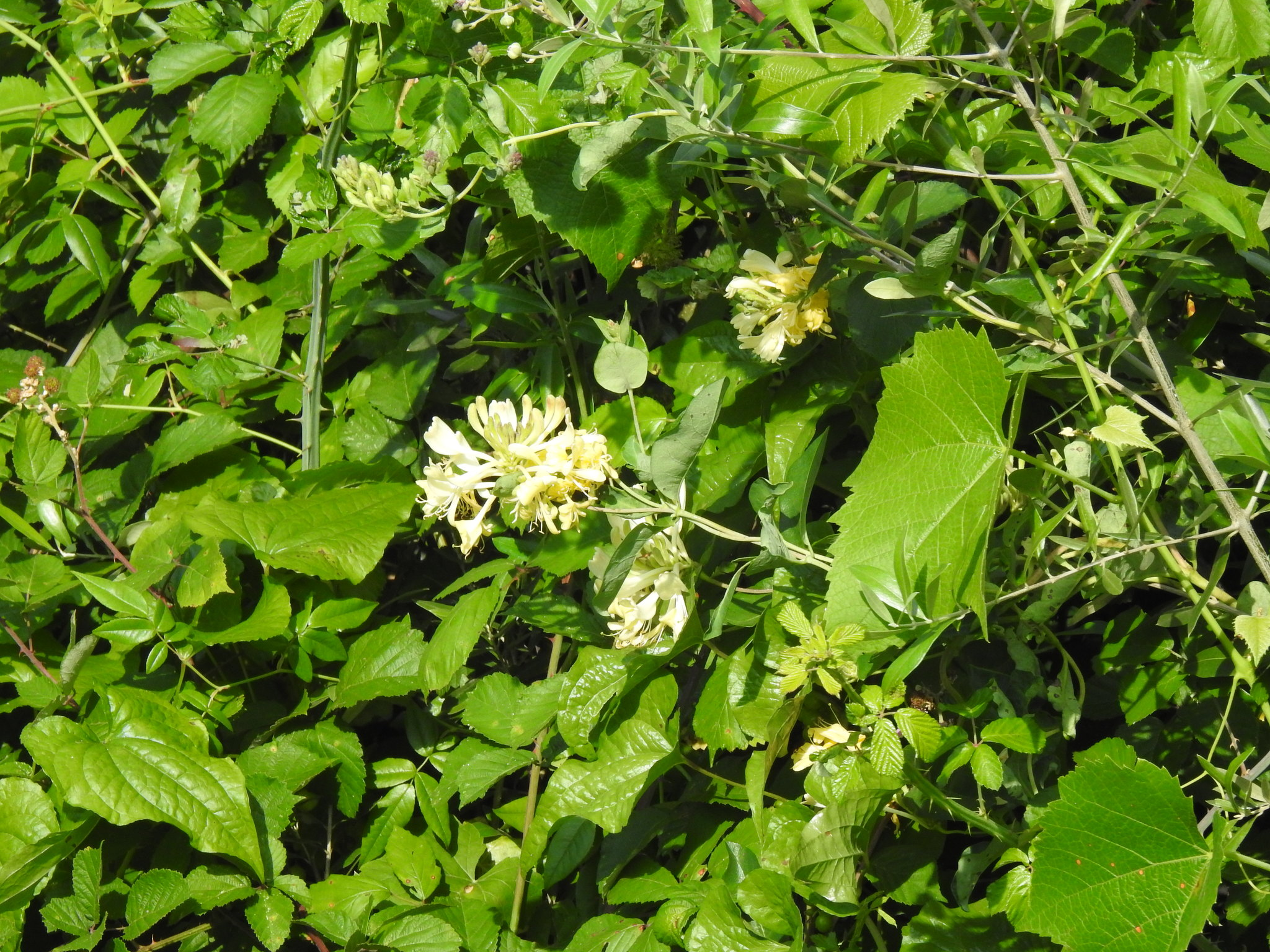
Lonicera periclymenum in Penacova, Portugal

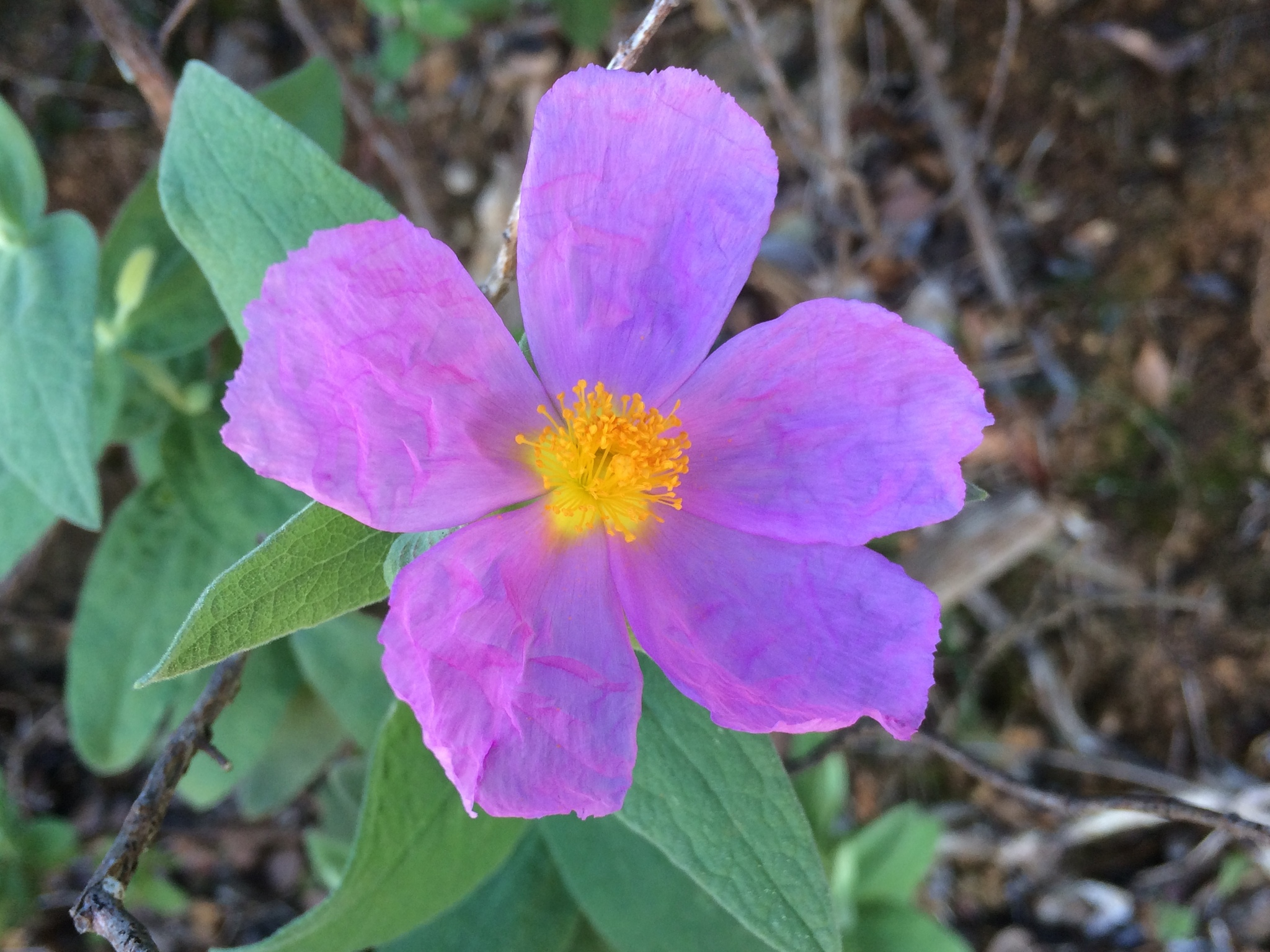
Cistus albidus in Setúbal, Portugal

== Fauna ==
The ecoregion is home to the endangered Iberian lynx (Lynx pardinus) and Spanish imperial eagle (Aquila adalberti). Both species live in and around Doñana National Park.

== Cork oak silviculture ==
The people of southern Portugal and southwestern Spain have developed land-use systems centered on cork oak (Quercus suber).

Cork oaks produce a thick protective bark which is harvested for cork. Harvesting involves peeling the bark from mature trees, which can begin when the trees reach a trunk diameter of 70 cm, typically when they are 20‐25 years old. Cork is harvested by hand with hand axes, and care is taken to minimize injury to the tree so it can continue to grow and produce more cork. Cork can be harvested every nine years from a given tree, and cork oaks can continue to grow and produce harvestable bark for 150 to 200 years or more. Industrially-usable cork is produced only after the third harvest, on trees that are forty years or more in age. Portugal is the planet's leading producer of cork, which is used for wine stoppers, flooring, sound insulation, floats, and more.

In Portugal, cork forests predominate in steeper areas with poor soils unsuited to agriculture, including the mountains of Algarve region and the hills of Alentejo region. Most cork forests are on private land. In some forests the understory shrubs are cleared to reduce fire risk, while in others the understory is allowed to grow naturally.

The traditional cork oak agro‐silvopastoral landscapes are known as montados in Portugal and dehesas in Spain. They have a lower tree density than oak forests (40 to 80 trees per hectare), and have an open canopy or widely spaced trees that resemble a savanna. The understory is kept clear of shrubs, and used for grazing animals or for growing crops, typically wheat, barley and oats.

From the 1920s to the 1960s, Portuguese governments promoted large-scale wheat production, and many montados in the lowlands were cleared for monoculture wheat fields and to accommodate tractors. Since the 1960s Portugal has urbanized, and European and Portuguese agricultural policies no longer favor small-scale wheat farming. As a result, some small montado farms have been abandoned, and others consolidated into larger commercial farming operations.

In Spain, the black Iberian pig is bred in enclosures but allowed to roam in the dehesas, where they graze on acorns. The pigs are slaughtered for Jamón ibérico, and ham from acorn-fed pigs is considered the highest quality. The ecoregion's oak species (Quercus ilex, Q. lusitanica, Q. pyrenaica, and Q. suber) produce acorns at different times of the year, so dehesas with diverse oak flora can sustain more pigs. Trained pigs are also used to harvest sought-after black truffles from the roots of oak trees.

In recent decades, interest in sustainable silviculture practices as a response to climate change and biodiversity loss has grown. Herdade do Freixo do Meio farm in Foros de Vale Figueira village, near Montemor-o-Novo in Alentejo, is reviving a form of montado silviculture. On the 600-hectare farm walnut, cork oak, olive, citrus, and other fruit and nut trees support grape vines, and provide food and shade to old varieties of pigs, cows, chickens, and turkeys.

== Plantations ==
Extensive areas of Portugal have been planted with plantations of Maritime pine (Pinus pinaster) and introduced eucalyptus, mostly Eucalyptus globulus. Pine is used chiefly for timber and particle board, while eucalyptus is used to make paper. From the 1970s onwards eucalyptus plantations increased in extent, mostly replacing pine plantations. 20% of the area planted in eucalyptus is managed by timber companies, with the rest on plots, often small, managed by individual landowners. Mixed stands of eucalyptus and pines are also common, particularly in untended plantations. Eucalyptus globulus can naturalize and spread into areas with sufficient water. In April 2017, the Portuguese government announced its intention to prohibit the expansion of eucalyptus plantations, which was opposed by the pulp industry and landowners. In the aftermath of the deadly June 2017 Portugal wildfires which resulted in 66 deaths and 204 injuries, the government announced further restrictions, including a ban on growing eucalyptus in certain areas, fines on the unauthorized purchase of eucalyptus seedlings, and permission to plant or re-plant eucalyptus only in designated areas, with one half-hectare permitted for each hectare removed from areas deemed unsuitable.

== Protected areas ==
14,761 km^{2}, or 21%, of the ecoregion is in protected areas.

Protected areas include Arrábida Natural Park (176.53 km^{2}), Ria Formosa Natural Park (179.01 km^{2}), Serras de Aire e Candeeiros Natural Park (383.92 km^{2}), Sintra-Cascais Natural Park (144.51 km^{2}), and Sudoeste Alentejano e Costa Vicentina Natural Park (895.72 km^{2}) in Portugal, and Los Alcornocales Natural Park and Doñana National Park in Spain.
