= European–Mediterranean montane mixed forest =

The European-Mediterranean montane mixed forests is a composite ecoregion of southern Europe and North Africa, designated by the World Wildlife Fund as one of their Global 200 ecoregions, a list of priority ecoregions for conservation.

These forests include temperate coniferous forests and temperate broadleaf and mixed forests covering several major mountain ranges of Europe and northern Africa, including the Alps, Pyrenees, Atlas Mountains, Balkan Mountains, Rhodope Mountains, and the Carpathian Mountains, and including parts of over two dozen countries.

The terrestrial ecoregions included within the larger ecoregion include:

- Alps conifer and mixed forests (Austria, France, Italy, Slovenia, Switzerland)
- Apennine deciduous montane forests (Italy)
- Carpathian montane conifer forests (Czech Republic, Poland, Romania, Slovakia, Ukraine)
- Crimean Submediterranean forest complex (Russia, Ukraine)
- Dinaric Mountains mixed forests (Albania, Bosnia and Herzegovina, Croatia, Italy, Montenegro, Serbia, Slovenia)
- Mediterranean conifer and mixed forests (Algeria, Morocco, Tunisia)
- Pyrenees conifer and mixed forests (France, Spain)
- Rodope montane mixed forests (Bulgaria, Greece, Macedonia, Serbia)
