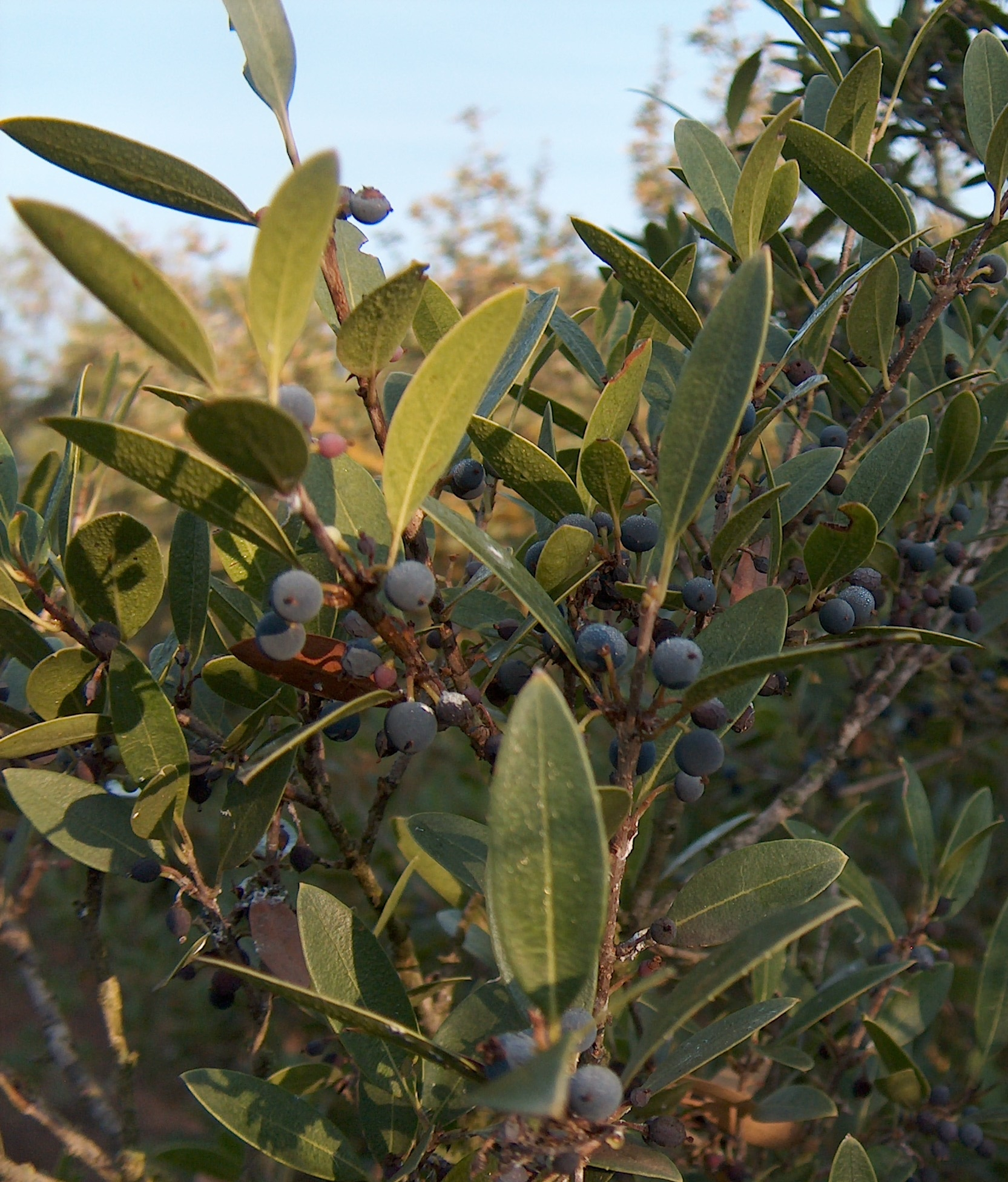

Scientific classification
- Kingdom: Plantae
- Clade: Tracheophytes
- Clade: Angiosperms
- Clade: Eudicots
- Clade: Asterids
- Order: Lamiales
- Family: Oleaceae
- Genus: Phillyrea
- Species: P. angustifolia

Binomial name
- Phillyrea angustifolia L.

= Phillyrea angustifolia =

Species of flowering plant

Phillyrea angustifolia, the narrow-leaved mock privet, is a species of flowering plant in the olive family Oleaceae, native to the western and central Mediterranean.

It is an evergreen shrub with simple, entire, leathery, dark green, oppositely arranged leaves. Scented creamy-white flowers are borne at the leaf axils in spring and summer, and are followed by purplish black berries.

The genus name Phillyrea is derived from Greek and means 'leafy', while the species' epithet angustifolia means 'narrow-leaved'.
