= Iberian sclerophyllous and semi-deciduous forests =

Terrestrial ecoregion in Spain and Portugal

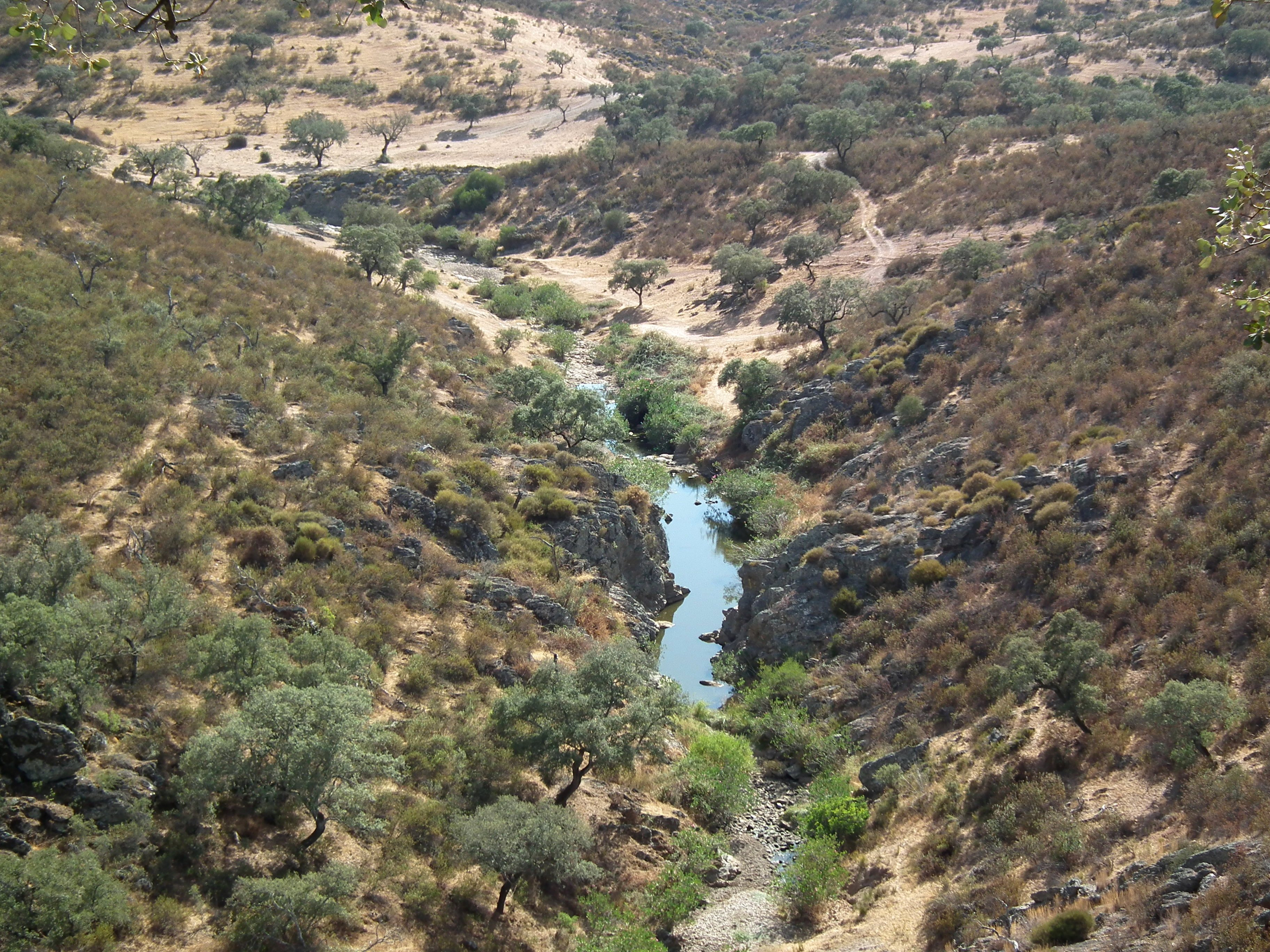
- Natural landscape around the Safareja watercourse, Moura, Portugal

- Location of the ecoregion (in purple)

Ecology
- Realm: Palearctic
- Biome: Mediterranean forests, woodlands, and scrub
- Borders: List: Cantabrian mixed forests; Iberian conifer forests; Northeast Spain and Southern France Mediterranean forests; Northwest Iberian montane forests; Pyrenees conifer and mixed forests; Southeastern Iberian shrubs and woodlands; Southwest Iberian Mediterranean sclerophyllous and mixed forests

Geography
- Area: 297,804 km^{2} (114,983 sq mi)
- Countries: Spain; Portugal

Conservation
- Conservation status: critical/endangered
- Protected: 74,552 km² (25%)

The Iberian sclerophyllous and semi-deciduous forests is a Mediterranean forests, woodlands, and scrub ecoregion in southwestern Europe. It occupies the interior valleys and plateaus of the Iberian Peninsula. The ecoregion lies mostly in Spain, and includes some portions of eastern Portugal.

== Geography ==
The ecoregion covers the interior basins of Iberia's main rivers – the Douro, Tagus, Guadiana, Guadalquivir, and Ebro. It is bounded on the north by the temperate-climate Pyrenees and Cantabrian mixed forests. Spain's interior mountains, which divide the various river basins, are home to the distinct Northwest Iberian montane forests and Iberian conifer forests ecoregions. Separate ecoregions also occupy the coastal lowlands – the Southwest Iberian Mediterranean sclerophyllous and mixed forests to the southwest, Southeastern Iberian shrubs and woodlands to the southeast, and the Northeast Spain and Southern France Mediterranean forests to the east.

== Climate ==
The ecoregion has a Mediterranean climate. The ecoregion's interior location means a hot, dry summer. Winters are generally mild, and colder in the northern portion of the ecoregion.

== Flora ==
Plant communities include forests, woodlands, maquis shrublands, grasslands, low shrublands, and wetlands. The predominant trees are evergreen sclerophyll broadleaf species and conifers.

Forests of holm oak (Quercus rotundifolia) and cork oak (Quercus suber) were once predominant in plains and valleys with deep alluvial soil. Over centuries most of these forests have been converted to agriculture, pasture, or maquis shrubland. Maquis shrubland is a dense thicket of tall woody shrubs and low trees, mixed with low shrubs, herbs, and grasses.

Olive-carob woodlands and maquis are common in the southern portion of the ecoregion, and in canyons in the northern Douro and Tagus basins. Wild olive (Olea europaea) and carob (Ceratonia siliqua) are the predominant trees, with the shrubs Chamaerops humilis, Pistacia lentiscus, Erica arborea, Erica scoparia, Phillyrea latifolia, Phillyrea angustifolia, and Myrtus communis, as well as lianas and herbs.

Forests of stone pine (Pinus pinea) and maritime pine (Pinus pinaster) are found on sandy soils and inland dunes, and on soils derived from silicaeous rocks. Stone pines provide edible pine nuts, and the maritime pines provide pine tar.

Areas of the southeast and Ebro valley with limestone, marl, and gypsum-derived soils are home a mosaic landscape, with mixed forest of Aleppo pine (Pinus halepensis) and holly oak (Quercus coccifera), open juniper woodlands of Juniperus thurifera and Juniperus phoenicea, steppe grasslands with Stipa tenacissima and Lygeum spartum, and low shrublands with Artemisia herba-alba, Thymelaea hirsuta, Ononis tridentata, Helianthemum squamatum, and Thymus mastigophorus.

Extensive seasonally-flooded saline wetlands of Suaeda fruticosa, Microcnemum coralloides, Aizoanthemum hispanicum, Arthrocnemum glaucum, and Limonium ovalifolium cover areas with poor drainage.

=== Agroforestry landscapes ===
Traditional agrosilvopastoral landscapes, known as dehesa in Spain and montado in Portugal, are found in the western portion of the ecoregion, and extending into the adjacent Southwest Iberian Mediterranean sclerophyllous and mixed forests ecoregion. They include scattered cork oak (Quercus suber) and holm oak trees interspersed with agricultural fields, olives and other fruit trees, and pastures. Dehesas support wildlife as well as livestock and crops, and forest products like cork, honey, mushrooms, and wild game. Over the past century many dehesas and montados were cleared to create larger single-crop fields of grain and other agricultural commodities.

== Fauna ==
The ecoregion is home to small populations of Iberian wolf (Canis lupus signatus) in the plains of northern Castile, and Iberian lynx (Lynx pardinus) in the southwest. Year-round resident birds include the Spanish imperial eagle (Aquila adalberti) and great bustard (Otis tarda). The woodlands are a wintering area for common cranes (Grus grus), and a breeding area for white storks (Ciconia ciconia) and black storks (Ciconia nigra).

== Protected areas ==
74,552 km^{2}, or 25%, of the ecoregion is in protected areas. Some protected areas include Guadiana Valley Natural Park in Portugal, and Sierra Norte de Sevilla Natural Park, Sierra de Hornachuelos Natural Park, Sierra Mágina Natural Park, Sierra de Andújar Natural Park, Monfragüe National Park, Arribes del Duero Natural Park, Lagunas de Villafáfila Nature Reserve, and Sierra de María-Los Vélez Natural Park in Spain.
