= Pyrenees conifer and mixed forests =

Terrestrial ecoregion in southwestern Europe

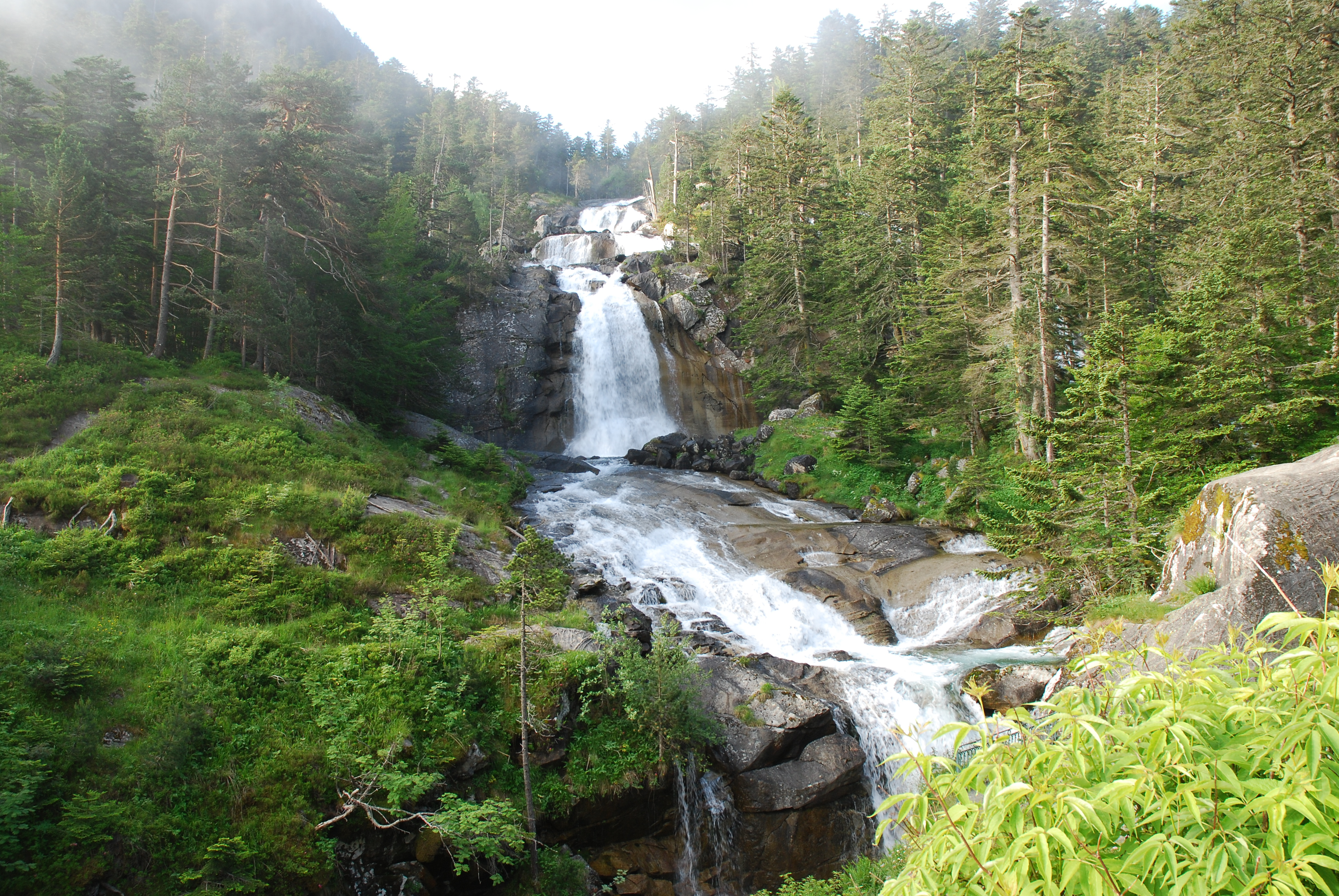
- Pont d'Espagne waterfall near Cauterets, Hautes-Pyrénées, France

- Location of the Pyrenees conifer and mixed forests

Ecology
- Realm: Palearctic
- Biome: temperate broadleaf and mixed forests
- Borders: List: Atlantic mixed forests; Iberian sclerophyllous and semi-deciduous forests; Northeast Spain and Southern France Mediterranean forests; Cantabrian mixed forests; Western European broadleaf forests

Geography
- Area: 25,931 km^{2} (10,012 mi^{2})
- Countries: Andorra; France; Spain
- Autonomous communities of Spain: Aragon; Catalonia; Navarre

Conservation
- Conservation status: vulnerable
- Global 200: European-Mediterranean montane mixed forest
- Protected: 3,863 km^{2} (15%)

The Pyrenees conifer and mixed forests is a temperate broadleaf and mixed forests ecoregion in southwestern Europe. It extends along the Pyrenees mountains which run east and west along the border between France and Spain, and includes all Andorra. The ecoregion extends from the lower slopes of the Pyrenees to its highest peaks, which include Aneto (3,404 m), Posets (3,375 m), and Vignemale (3,298 m).

The Pyrenees forests are at the transition between the Mediterranean climate regions of Spain and France, which lie to the south and east, and the more humid and temperate forests of Western Europe, which lie to the west and north.

== Flora ==
The ecoregion's elevational range, and its various climatic regions (maritime temperate to the west, continental in the center, and Mediterranean to the east) support a variety of plant communities and species. The ecoregion has 3500 native plant species, including 200 endemic species.

The forested foothills of the southern slope, known as the Pre-Pyrenees, have a transitional Mediterranean climate with dry summers. Characteristic trees include evergreen holm oak (Quercus rotundifolia), holm oak (Quercus ilex), Cork oak (Quercus suber), Kermes oak, Wild olive (Olea europaea), Sweet bay (Laurus nobilis), Strawberry tree (Arbutus unedo), Rhamnus alaternus, Pistacia terebinthus, Erica arborea, Erica scoparia, Pinus pinaster, Juniperus oxycedrus and deciduous Quercus faginea, Quercus pubescens, Quercus pyrenaica, Tilia platyphyllos, and Acer opalus.

Middle-elevation forests include deciduous broadleaf trees like Quercus robur, Quercus petraea, Q. pubescens, Castanea sativa, Ulmus glabra, Acer pseudoplatanus, Taxus baccata, Populus tremula, Betula pendula, Betula pubescens and European beech (Fagus sylvatica), and conifer forests of Scots pine (Pinus sylvestris) and Pyrenean pine (Pinus nigra subsp. salzmannii var. salzmannii). Heathlands dominated by Calluna vulgaris, Ulex and Juniperus communis grow in the western part of the ecoregion.

High-elevation forests are predominantly of European beech and silver fir (Abies alba). Mountain pine (Pinus mugo subsp. uncinata) is common in continental-climate areas of the central Pyrenees with colder winters.

Subalpine and alpine plant communities occur above the timberline, are dominated by Juniperus communis and Calluna vulgaris and include many endemic species.

== Fauna ==
Large mammals include Eurasian brown bear (Ursus arctos), Iberian wolf (Canis lupus signatus), Pyrenean chamois (Rupicapra pyrenaica pyrenaica), wild boar (Sus scrofa), red deer (Cervus elaphus elaphus), and roe deer (Capreolus capreolus). The reclusive Pyrenean desman (Galemys pyrenaicus) is a vulnerable small mammal that lives here and in the Cantabrian Mountains.

The Cantabrian brown bear, a distinct southwest-European subspecies of Eurasian brown bear, is now extinct in the Pyrenees; the last Cantabrian brown bear was shot in 2004. The Cantabrian brown bear now survives further west in the Cantabrian Mountains. Starting in 1996, the French government reintroduced Eurasian brown bears from Slovenia to the French Pyrenees. As of 2019, there were 40 to 50 brown bears in the Pyrenees.

The Pyrenean ibex (Capra pyrenaica pyrenaica) went extinct in 2000. In 2014 a small number of Western Spanish ibex (Capra pyrenaica victoriae) were introduced to Pyrenees National Park. By 2020 the population had increased to 400 individuals in the national park and neighboring Ariège Regional Park.

The Pyrenees are home to 120 species of birds, including limited populations of lammergeier (Gypaetus barbatus), Pyrenean capercaillie (Tetrao urogallus aquitanicus) and rock ptarmigan (Lagopus muta).

== Protected areas ==
3,863 km^{2}, or 10%, of the ecoregion is in protected areas. Only 1% of the unprotected area is still covered with natural forest. Protected areas include Valles Occidentales Natural Park, Ordesa y Monte Perdido National Park, and Posets-Maladeta Natural Park in Aragon, Aigüestortes i Estany de Sant Maurici National Park, Alt Pirineu Natural Park, and Cadí-Moixeró Natural Park in Catalonia, and Pyrénées National Park, Pyrénées ariégeoises Regional Natural Park, and Pyrénées catalanes Regional Natural Park in France.
