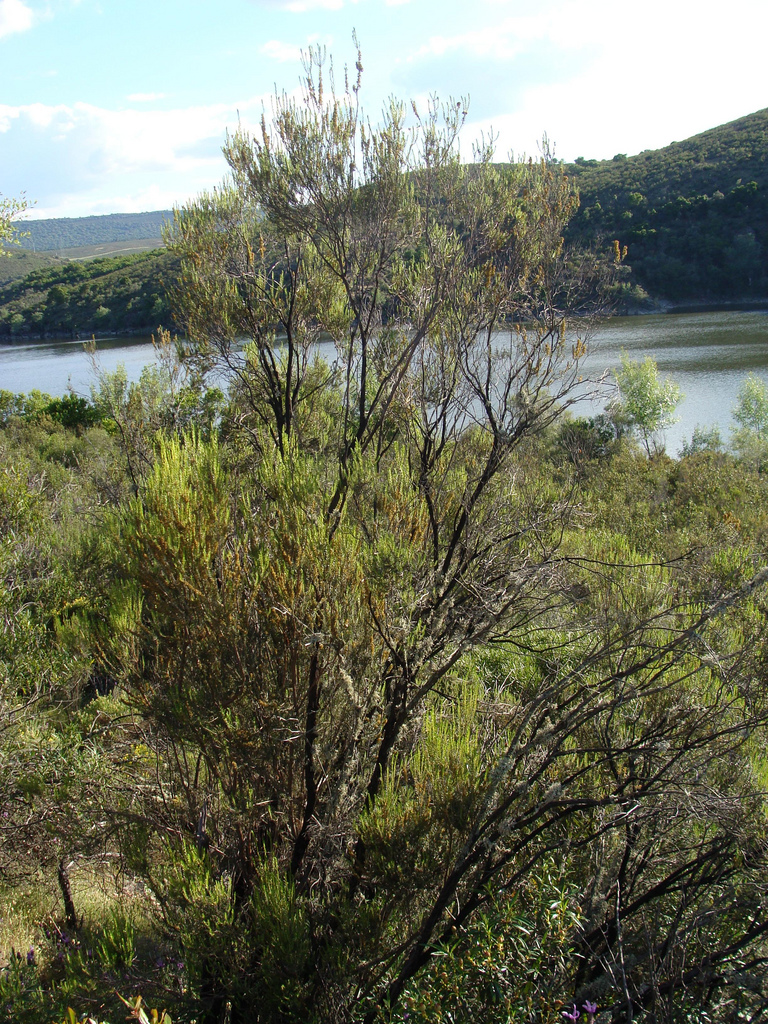

Scientific classification
- Kingdom: Plantae
- Clade: Tracheophytes
- Clade: Angiosperms
- Clade: Eudicots
- Clade: Asterids
- Order: Ericales
- Family: Ericaceae
- Genus: Erica
- Species: E. scoparia

Binomial name
- Erica scoparia L.

= Erica scoparia =

Species of flowering plant

Erica scoparia, the green heather or common besom heath, is a shrubby European species of heath in the flowering plant family Ericaceae.

== Description ==
Erica scoparia is a perennial evergreen shrub with small yellowish white to red-brown bell-shaped drooping flowers borne in clusters at the ends of its shoots.

== Distribution and habitat ==
It is native to the western Mediterranean Basin in the Iberian Peninsula (Spain and Portugal), Northwest Africa (Morocco, Algeria and Tunisia), Southern France, Italy, Balearic Islands, Sardinia and Corsica.

It is found in a range of Mediterranean habitats, including semi-arid locations. Its distribution seems to largely depend on water availability (being considered hygrophytic) and dissolved aluminum in the soil. It is quite consistent under varied levels of shade.
