= Cantabrian mixed forests =

Ecoregion in southwestern Europe

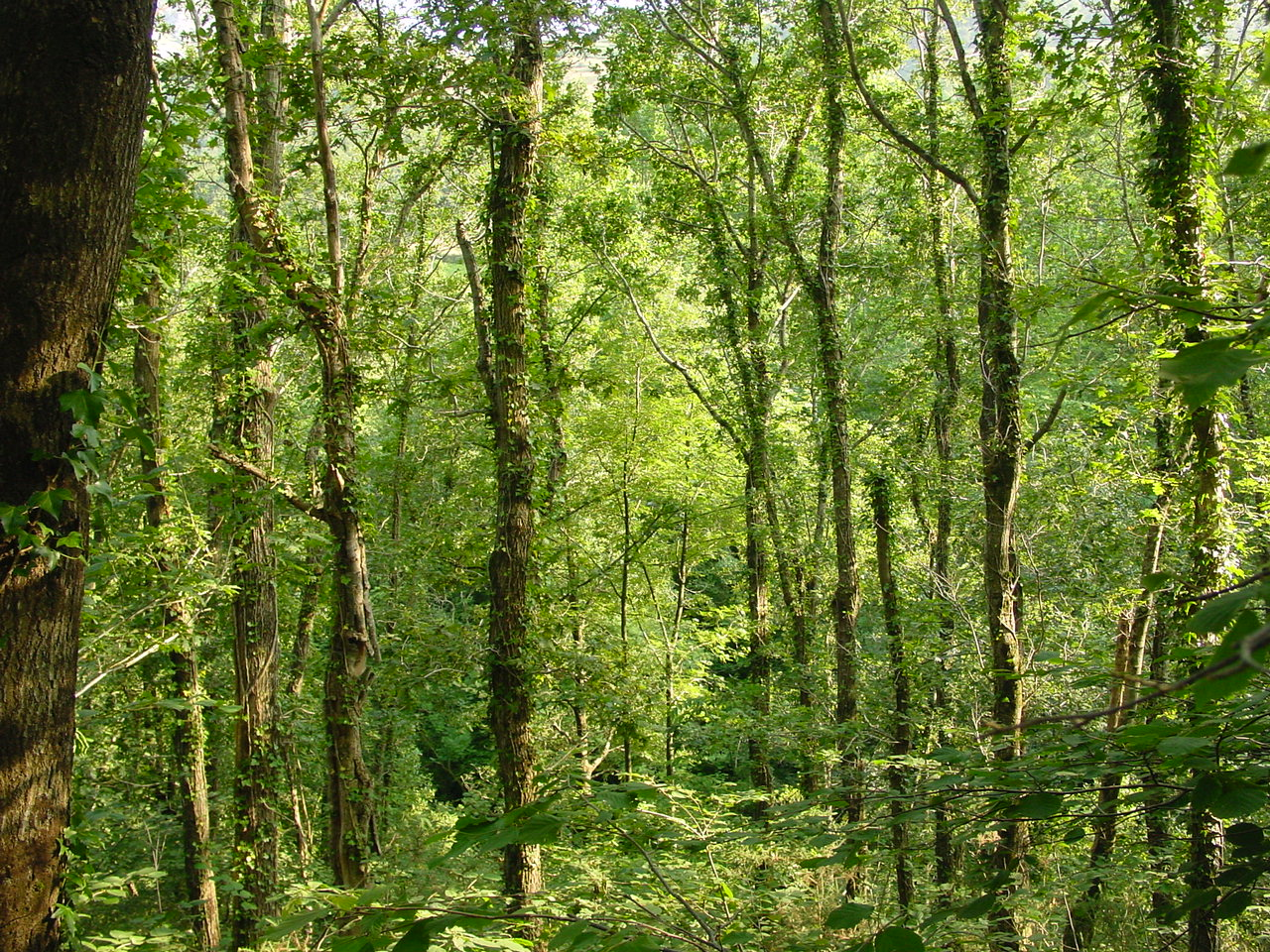
- Forest in Cantabria

- Location of the Cantabrian mixed forests

Ecology
- Realm: Palearctic
- Biome: temperate broadleaf and mixed forests
- Borders: List: Atlantic mixed forests; Iberian sclerophyllous and semi-deciduous forests; Northwest Iberian montane forests; Pyrenees conifer and mixed forests; Southwest Iberian Mediterranean sclerophyllous and mixed forests

Geography
- Area: 95,158 km^{2} (36,741 sq mi)
- Countries: Spain; France; Portugal
- Autonomous communities of Spain: Asturias; Basque Country; Cantabria; Castile and León; Galicia; La Rioja; Navarre

Conservation
- Conservation status: vulnerable
- Protected: 9,294 km^{2} (10%)

The Cantabrian mixed forests is a temperate broadleaf and mixed forests ecoregion in southwestern Europe. It extends along the coastal Cantabrian Mountains and Galician Massif of Northern Spain, extending south into northern Portugal, and northwards through the westernmost Pyrenees to southwestern France. The ecoregion extends from the seacoast to the highest peaks of the Cantabrian Mountains. The highest peak is Torre Cerredo at 2,648 meters elevation.

The ecoregion is transitional between the Mediterranean climate and Oceanic climate regions of Spain and Portugal and the more humid and temperate forests of Western Europe. The lowlands have mild temperate climates, while the high mountains experience cold winters.

== Flora ==
The ecoregion's elevational range supports several plant communities.

The lowlands are characterized by broadleaf deciduous forests, with English oak (Quercus robur), sweet chestnut (Castanea sativa), European ash (Fraxinus excelsior), lindens (Tilia platyphyllos and Tilia cordata), wych elm (Ulmus glabra), and maples (Acer pseudoplatanus and Acer platanoides). Characteristically Mediterranean evergreen trees and shrubs, including holm oak (Quercus ilex), cork oak (Quercus suber), sweet bay (Laurus nobilis), strawberry tree (Arbutus unedo), and Rhamnus alaternus, can be found in warm and well-drained areas like limestone outcrops. Maritime pine (Pinus pinaster) is common on Atlantic coastal dunes in northern Portugal and western Galicia, and further inland on rocky dry slopes.

Middle- and upper-elevation forests are characterized by deciduous oaks (Quercus petraea and Quercus pyrenaica), with European beech (Fagus sylvatica) from the Cantabrian Mountains eastward into France.

Stands of white birch (Betula pubescens) appear below the timber line. Above the timber line (1800 meters), subalpine plant communities including low shrubs (including dwarf juniper and heathers), grasses, peat bogs, and rock outcrops cover the highest peaks.

== Fauna ==
Large mammals include Cantabrian brown bear (Ursus arctos), Iberian wolf (Canis lupus signatus), Cantabrian chamois (Rupicapra pyrenaica parva), wild boar (Sus scrofa), red deer (Cervus elaphus elaphus), and roe deer (Capreolus capreolus). Feral horses (Equus caballus) roam in Galicia's mountains. The broom hare (Lepus castroviejoi) is an endemic species to the Cantabrian Mountains. The reclusive Pyrenean desman (Galemys pyrenaicus) is a vulnerable small mammal that lives here and in the Pyrenees.

The Cantabrian brown bears number over 200 individuals, who live in the Cantabrian Mountains of southern Asturias and Cantabria and the adjacent portion of Castile and León. The brown bear population has increased in recent decades from fewer than 100 in the 1990s. The Cantabrian population is the larger of the two remaining brown bear populations in southwestern Europe; the other is in the Pyrenees.

The Cantabrian capercaillie (Tetrao urogallus cantabricus) is an endangered subspecies of grouse. Its population and range are declining from habitat destruction, human disturbance, and over-hunting.

== Protected areas ==
9,294 km^{2} (10%) of the ecoregion is in protected areas. Another 23% is forested and outside protected areas. Protected areas include Picos de Europa National Park (661.2 km^{2}), Somiedo (289.8 km^{2}), Redes, (376.98 km^{2}), Fuentes del Narcea, Degaña e Ibias (576.34 km^{2}), Fuentes Carrionas y Fuente Cobre - Montaña Palentina (781.41 km^{2}), Ponga (205.06 km^{2}), Fragas do Eume (91.49 km^{2}), and Aiako harria (68.95 km^{2}) natural parks in Spain, and Peneda-Gerês National Park (695.92 km^{2}) in Portugal.
