= Southeastern Iberian shrubs and woodlands =

Terrestrial ecoregion in southeastern Spain

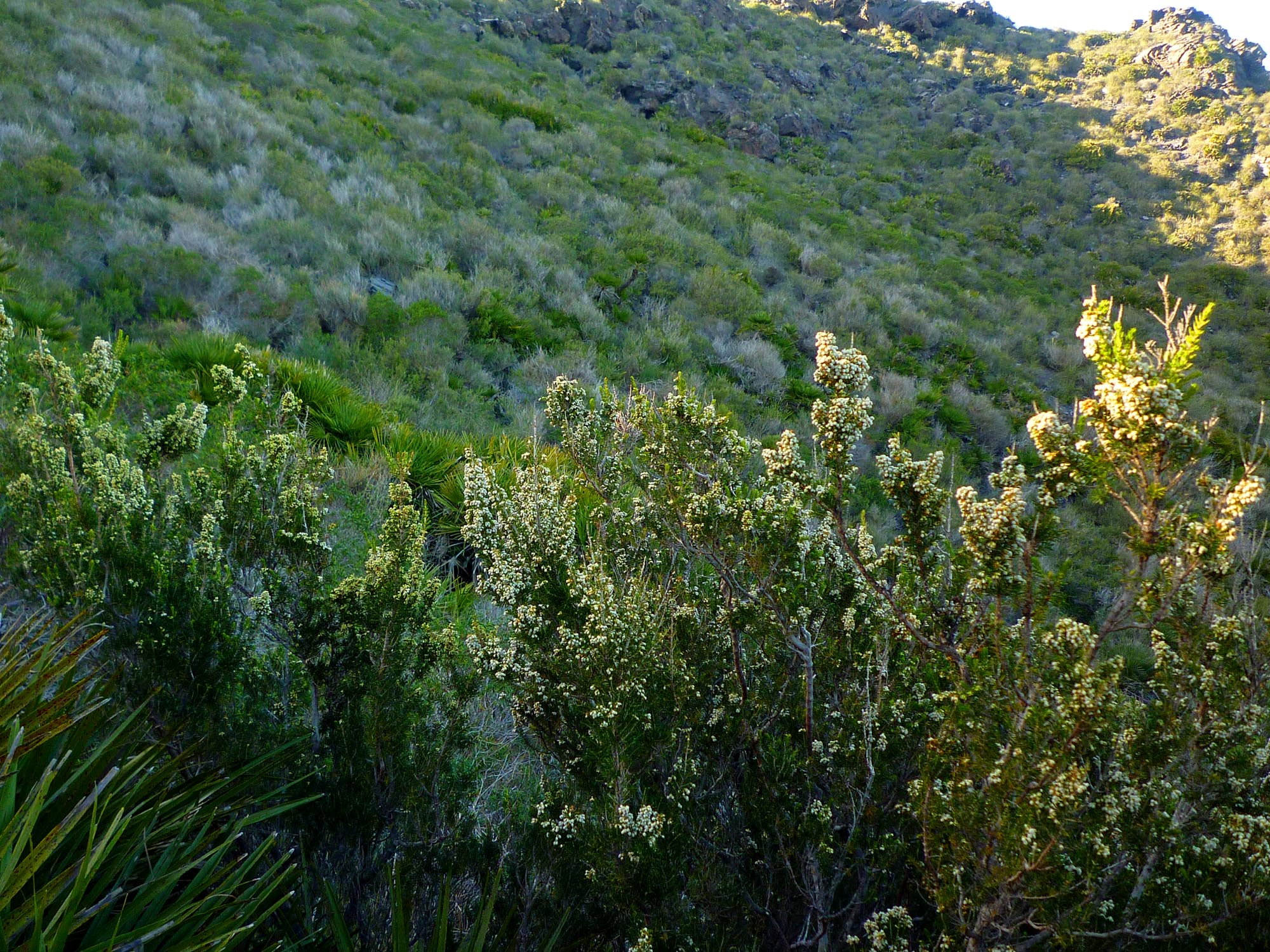
- Erica arborea in Calblanque Regional Park

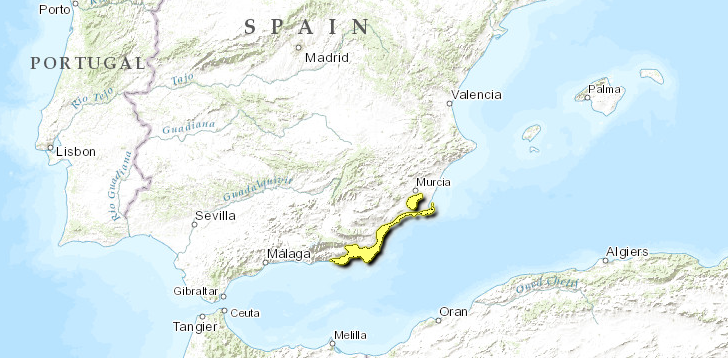
- Location map of the Southeastern Iberian shrubs and woodlands

Ecology
- Realm: Palearctic
- Biome: Mediterranean forests, woodlands, and scrub
- Borders: Iberian conifer forests; Iberian sclerophyllous and semi-deciduous forests

Geography
- Area: 2,684 km^{2} (1,036 sq mi)
- Country: Spain
- autonomous communities of Spain: Andalucia; Murcia

Conservation
- Conservation status: Critical/endangered
- Protected: 952 km^{2} (35%)

The Southeastern Iberian shrubs and woodlands is a Mediterranean forests, woodlands, and scrub ecoregion in southwestern Europe. It lies in southeastern coastal Spain, along the Mediterranean Sea.

== Geography ==
The ecoregion covers coastal low plains, hills, and badlands close to Spain's southeastern coast.

The ecoregion's geology is complex, made up mostly of sedimentary rocks like marl, gypsum, limestone, conglomerate, sandstone and consolidated dunes, together with coastal outcrops of volcanic rock like Cabo de Gata. The region is geologically active, with faults, earthquakes, recently uplifted areas.

The seashore includes both coastal dunes and lagoons and areas of rocky coast.

The cities of Almería and Cartagena are in the ecoregion.

== Climate ==
The ecoregion has an arid climate and semi-arid climate, with rainfall mostly in the winter months, and sunshine mostly in the summer months. The ecoregion is hotter and drier than neighboring ecoregions, and known as 'thermo-Mediterranean'. Annual rainfall ranges from 200 to 400 mm. Winters are mild, averaging 11–12º C. Summers are hot and dry. Drying winds like the Saharan sirocco are frequent.

== Flora ==
Shrublands are the predominant vegetation. The shrublands vary in height and species composition based on underlying soils. The area is very species-rich; more than half of the c. 7500 vascular plants found in Iberia occur in the Murcian-Almerian bioprovince, which overlaps the ecoregion.

"Open high-shrub communities" are the most common, composed of drought-adapted shrubs like Ziziphus lotus, Withania frutescens, Periploca angustifolia, Calicotome intermedia, Rosmarinus eriocalyx, Maytenus senegalensis subsp. europaea, Cistus libanotis, Ephedra fragilis, Genista ramosissima, Lycium intricatum, Rhamnus oleoides, Pistacia lentiscus, Olea europaea var. sylvestris, Chamaerops humilis, and Launaea arborescens.

Trees are uncommon. Conifers, including pines, junipers, and Tetraclinis articulata, occasionally grow in the high shrublands. Seasonally-dry streambeds are home to the broadleaf trees Tamarix spp., white poplar (Populus alba), and oleander (Nerium oleander).

Garrigue communities grow in drier and rockier areas, often close to the seacoast. Garrigue is characterized by aromatic and medicinal subshrubs, including species of thyme (Thymus), sage (Salvia), Sideritis, germander (Teucrium), and lavender (Lavandula), with succulent plants like Caralluma europaea and herbaceous species.

Dry grasslands are characterized by the grasses Stipa tenacissima and Lygeum spartum, interspersed with subshrubs like Artemisia herba-alba. The fiber from S. tenacissima and L. spartum is known as esparto, and is harvested to make paper, cords, baskets, and espadrilles.

Salt-rich soils are home to salt-tolerant (halophyte) plant communities, including species of Suaeda, Salsola, and Limonium, and Arthrocaulon macrostachyum, Atriplex halimus, Anabasis articulata, and Haloxylon articulatum.

== Fauna ==
Resident birds include the little bustard (Tetrax tetrax), black-bellied sandgrouse (Pterocles orientalis), Mediterranean short-toed lark (Alaudala rufescens), Thekla's lark (Galerida theklae), black wheatear (Oenanthe leucura), and Dupont's lark (Chersophilus duponti).

The ecoregion's lagoons and salt marshes support water birds. A community of greater flamingos (Phoenicopterus roseus) lives in the Cabo de Gata wetlands. Punta Entinas-Sabinar is home to the Eurasian stone-curlew (Burhinus oedicnemus), Audouin's gull (Ichthyaetus audouinii), and slender-billed gull (Chroicocephalus genei).

== Human effects ==
Human activities, including grazing sheep and goats, agriculture, hunting, mining, and urbanization, have been altering the region's ecology for centuries. In recent decades many rural people have migrated to cities, and lands formerly used for grazing and agriculture have reverted to native vegetation. Gathering esparto for paper and fiber was historically a means of livelihood, but its use and economic importance has declined in recent decades. Cities and tourism-related development have expanded along the coast. The coastal plains around Almería are used for intensive farming, particularly greenhouses.

== Protected areas ==
952 km^{2}, or 35%, of the ecoregion is in protected areas. Protected areas include Calblanque Regional Park, Cabo de Gata-Nijar Natural Park, Punta Entinas-Sabinar Nature Reserve, and Desierto de Tabernas Nature Reserve.
