= Northeastern Spain and Southern France Mediterranean forests =

Ecoregion in Southern Europe

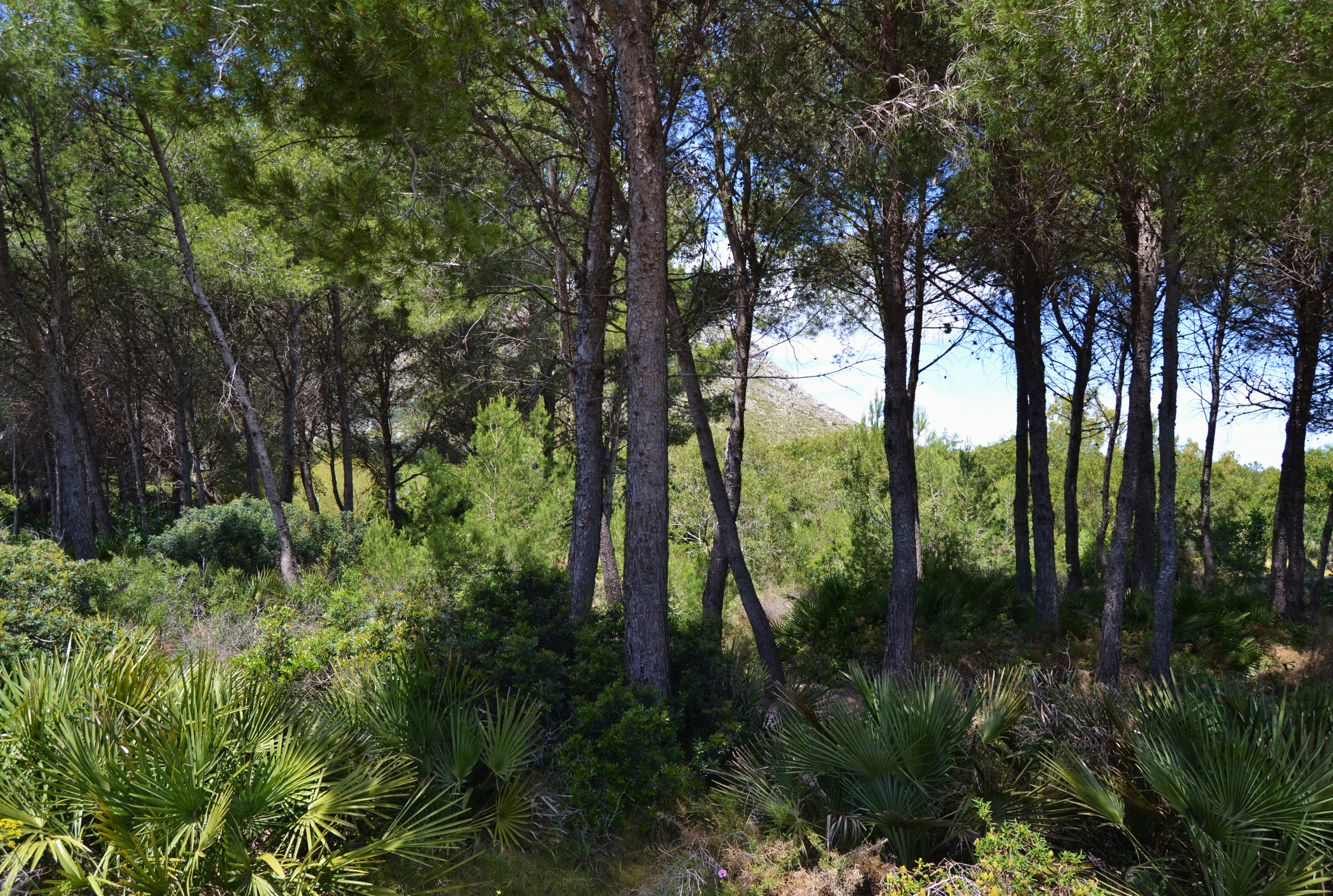
- Pine forest in Xàbia

- Location of the ecoregion (in purple)

Ecology
- Realm: Palearctic
- Biome: Mediterranean forests, woodlands, and scrub
- Borders: List: Alps conifer and mixed forests; Iberian sclerophyllous and semi-deciduous forests; Italian sclerophyllous and semi-deciduous forests; Pyrenees montane forests; Western European broadleaf forests

Geography
- Area: 89,397 km^{2} (34,516 sq mi)
- Countries: France; Spain; Italy
- autonomous communities of spain: Balearic Islands; Catalonia; Valencian Community

Conservation
- Conservation status: Critical/endangered
- Protected: 35,864 km² (40%)

The Northeastern Spain and Southern France Mediterranean forests is a Mediterranean forests, woodlands, and scrub ecoregion in southwestern Europe. It occupies the Mediterranean coastal region of northeastern Spain, Southern France, the Balearic Islands and a small part of Italy.

== Geography ==
The ecoregion extends along the Mediterranean coastal region of northeastern Spain, including the coastal Valencian and Catalonian regions and the Balearic Islands, the coastal Languedoc and Provence regions of southeastern France and parts of Ligurian Alps in Italy. It includes coastal plains, hills, and mountains.

== Climate ==
The ecoregion has a Mediterranean climate. The ecoregion has hot and dry summers, and mild temperate and rainy winters. Average annual temperature ranges from 10 to 17º C. The coldest winter temperatures average 5 to 10º C. Average annual rainfall varies from 350 to 800 mm. Interior Spain to the west has a more continental Mediterranean climate with colder winters. Central France to the north has a more humid, temperate, and continental climate, with rainier summers and colder winters.

== Flora ==
The plant communities of the ecoregion are varied, and include forests, woodlands, shrublands, and grasslands.

Broadleaf forests are principally of oaks, including evergreen holm oak (Quercus ilex), Quercus rotundifolia, Quercus coccifera, Quercus robur, Quercus petraea, and cork oak (Quercus suber), and deciduous oaks – Quercus pubescens in southern france, and Quercus faginea in mainland Spain, together with Quercus canariensis and Quercus pyrenaica in northern Catalonia's coastal mountains. Oak forests on the Balearic Islands.

Mixed forests of oaks and stone pine (Pinus pinea) grow on rocky silicaceous coastal mountain slopes. Forests of maritime pine (Pinus pinaster) grow on sandstone-derived soils in some coastal mountains. Mixed forests of Aleppo pine (Pinus halepensis) and holly oak (Quercus coccifera) are found on soils derived from limestone and marl.

High shrublands, known as maquis or mattoral, are common. They are composed of low trees and woody shrubs, with an understory of herbs and grasses. Dominant maquis/matorral trees are wild olive (Olea europaea) and carob (Ceratonia siliqua).

Low shrubland, known as garrigue, grows on dry rocky slopes, often near the seacoast. Garrigue is characterized by low aromatic and medicinal shrubs, along with herbs and grasses. Maquis of stone pines and the shrubs Juniperus phoenicea, Pistacia lentiscus, Myrtus communis and Chamaerops humilis grow on stabilized coastal dunes.

The ecoregion has wetlands, particularly in the Rhone and Ebro deltas. Freshwater and semi-saline wetlands are characterized by Agropyron spp., Puccinellia spp., and Juncus maritimus. Saline wetlands are dominated by Salicornia herbacea and Salicornia fruticosa.

== Fauna ==
Large mammals include wild boar (Sus scrofa), red deer (Cervus elaphus elaphus), roe deer (Capreolus capreolus) and Iberian wolf (Canis lupus signatus). The Camargue (Rhone Delta) and Ebro Delta are important habitats for water birds.

== Protected areas ==
35,864 km², or 40%, of the ecoregion is in protected areas. Protected areas include:

- Albera Natural Reserve, Catalonia
- Alpilles Regional Natural Park, France
- Barronies Provençales Regional Natural Park, France
- Calanques National Park, France
- Camargue Regional Natural Park, France
- Cap de Creus Natural Park, Catalonia
- Zona Volcànica de la Garrotxa Natural Park, Catalonia
- Grands Causses Regional Natural Park, France
- Haut-Languedoc Regional Nature Park, France
- Luberon Regional Natural Park, France
- Ports Natural Park, Catalonia
- Préalpes d'Azur Regional Natural Park, France
- Sant Llorenç del Munt i l'Olbac Natural Park, Catalonia
- Serra Calderona Natural Park, Valencian Community
- Verdon Regional Natural Park, France
