= List of ecoregions in Greece =

The following is a list of ecoregions in Greece as identified by the World Wide Fund for Nature (WWF).

== Terrestrial ==
Greece is in the Palearctic realm. Ecoregions are listed by biome.

Temperate broadleaf and mixed forests

- Balkan mixed forests
- Rodope montane mixed forests

Mediterranean forests, woodlands, and shrub

- Illyrian deciduous forests
- Pindus Mountains mixed forests
- Aegean and Western Turkey sclerophyllous and mixed forests
- Crete Mediterranean forests

== Freshwater ==
- Aegean drainages
- Ionian drainages
- Southeast Adriatic drainages
- Thrace
- Vardar
- Western Anatolia

== Marine ==
Greece's seas are in the Mediterranean Sea marine province of the Temperate Northern Atlantic marine realm.

- Aegean Sea
- Ionian Sea
