= Rodopi =

Rodopi may refer to:

- Rhodope Mountains, a mountain range in Southeastern Europe
- Rodopi (village), a village in Haskovo Province, southern Bulgaria
- Rodopi Peak, a peak in the South Shetland Islands
- Rhodope (regional unit), an administrative unit of Greece
- Rodopi Municipality, a municipality in Plovdiv Province, Bulgaria
- Rodopi (publisher), an academic publishing company in the Netherlands
- SS Rodopi, a Hansa A Type cargo ship in service 1946-74
- Rodopi Mountain Range National Park, a national park in Greece
