= Illyrian deciduous forests =

Terrestrial ecoregion of Europe

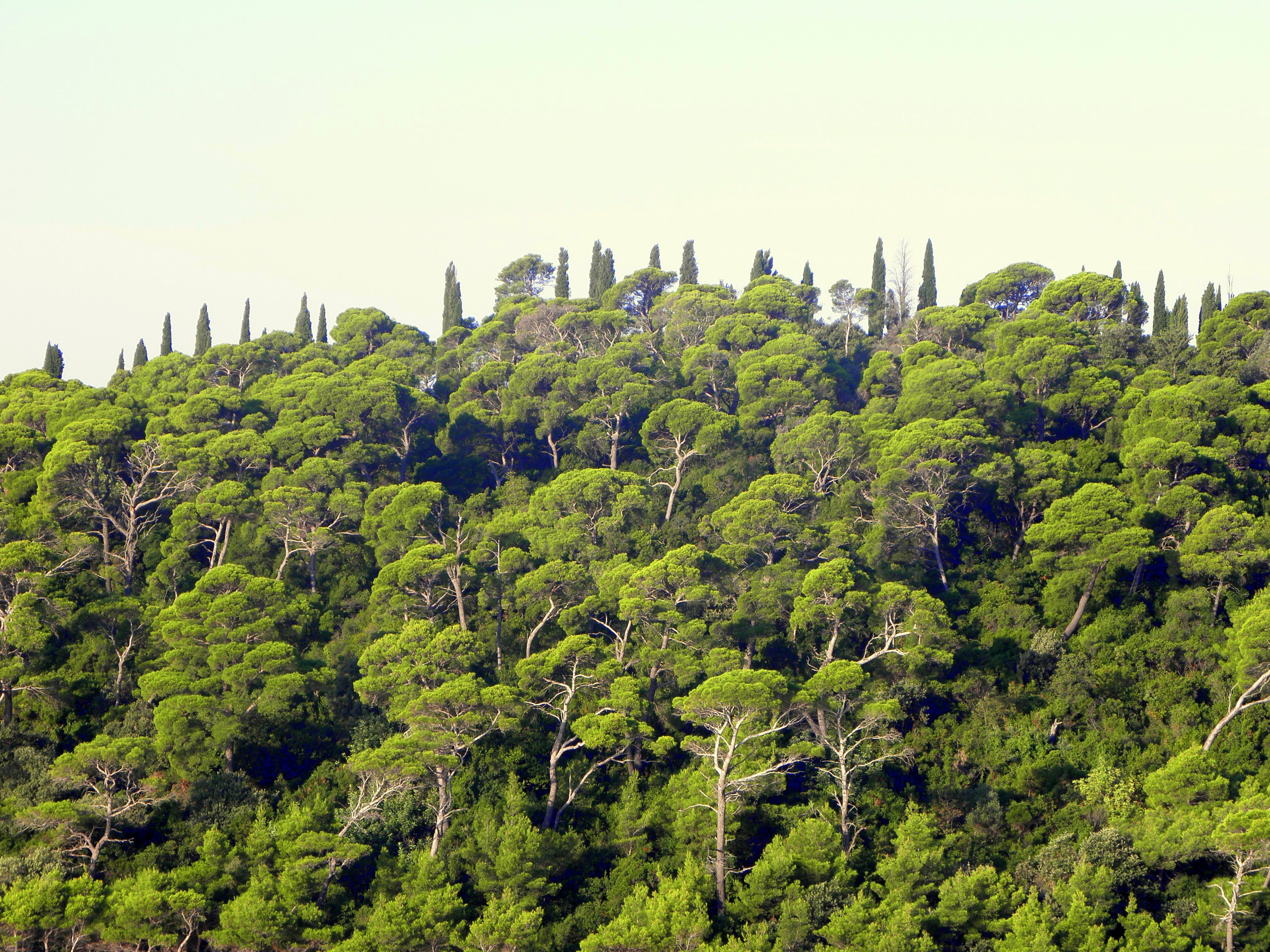
- forest with Aleppo pine (Pinus halapensis) near Dubrovnik, Croatia.

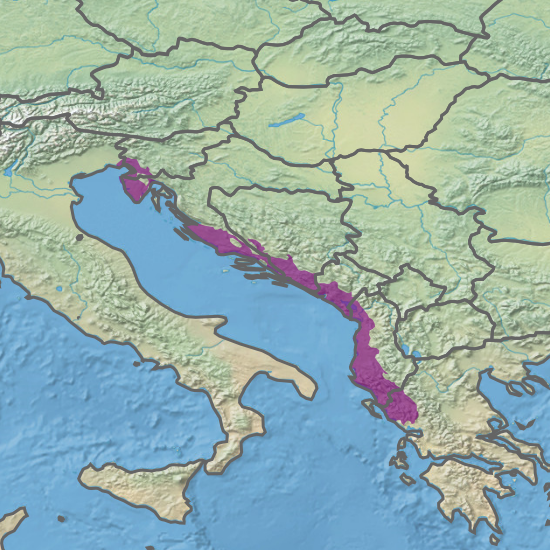
- Ecoregion territory (in purple)

Ecology
- Realm: Palearctic
- Biome: Mediterranean forests, woodlands, and scrub
- Borders: Aegean and Western Turkey sclerophyllous and mixed forests; Dinaric Mountains mixed forests; Pindus Mountains mixed forests; Po Basin mixed forests

Geography
- Area: 39,390 km^{2} (15,210 mi^{2})
- Countries: List: Albania; Bosnia and Herzegovina; Croatia; Greece; Italy; Montenegro; Slovenia

Conservation
- Conservation status: critical/endangered
- Protected: 8,855 km^{2} (22%)

The Illyrian deciduous forests is a terrestrial ecoregion in southern Europe, which extends along the eastern coast of the Adriatic Sea. It belongs to the Mediterranean forests, woodlands, and scrub biome, and is in the Palearctic realm.

== Geography ==
The Illyrian deciduous forests stretch along the eastern coast of the Ionian and Adriatic Seas, and occupies 40,600 km^{2} (15,700 sq mi) in Northern Greece, Albania, Montenegro, Bosnia and Herzegovina, Croatia, Slovenia and Northern Italy around Trieste.

The ecoregion is bounded by the Aegean and Western Turkey sclerophyllous and mixed forests (in Greece), Pindus Mountains mixed forests (in Greece and Albania), Dinaric Mountains mixed forests (in Albania, Montenegro, Bosnia and Herzegovina, Croatia, Slovenia and Italy) and Po Basin mixed forests (in Italy).

== Climate ==
The climate of the ecoregion is mostly of Köppen's Mediterranean type with hot summers (Csa) to humid subtropical with wet winters (Cfa).

== Flora ==
Coastal slopes are include various deciduous oaks Quercus frainetto, Q. pubescens, Q. cerris, Quercus trojana, and Quercus macrolepis, with other deciduous trees and shrubs Carpinus orientalis, sweet chestnut (Castanea sativa), Fraxinus ornus, Cotinus coggygria, Paliurus spina-christi, and Cercis siliquastrum. Near the coast maquis shrubs and evergreen trees, including Quercus ilex, Quercus coccifera, Pinus halepensis, Pinus pinea, Pistacia terebinthus, P. lentiscus, Erica arborea, Juniperus oxycedrus, J. macrocarpa, Olea europaea, Arbutus unedo, A. andrachne, and Nerium oleander, are predominant.

10 to 20% of the ecoregion's plant species are endemic, including Primula kitaibeliana, Symphyandra hofmannii, and Resetnikia triquetra. Degenia velebitica is endemic to the Velebit mountains, native to both the Illyrian deciduous forests and the higher-elevation Dinaric Mountains mixed forests ecoregion.

== Ecoregion delineation ==
The Illyrian deciduous forests ecoregion is delineated by the WWF and Digital Map of European Ecological Regions by the European Environment Agency. Phytogeographically, the ecoregion is shared between the Adriatic and East Mediterranean provinces of the Mediterranean Region within the Holarctic Kingdom (according to Armen Takhtajan's delineation).
