= Balkan mixed forests =

Terrestrial ecoregion of Europe

Danubian and Balkan mixed forests
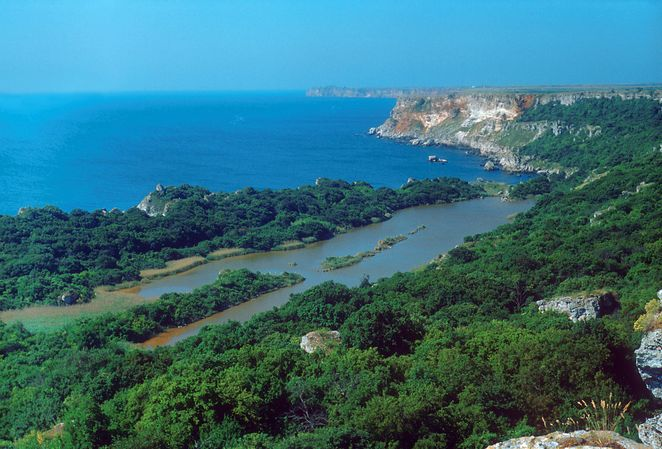
- Forests on the Bulgarian Black Sea Coast

- Location of the Balkan mixed forests (in purple)

Ecology
- Realm: Palearctic
- Biome: Temperate broadleaf and mixed forests
- Borders: List: Aegean and Western Turkey sclerophyllous and mixed forests; Carpathian montane forests; Central European mixed forests; Dinaric Mountains mixed forests; East European forest steppe; Euxine-Colchic broadleaf forests; Central European mixed forests; Pannonian mixed forests; Pindus Mountains mixed forests; Rodope montane mixed forests; Central European mixed forests

Geography
- Area: 224,344 km^{2} (86,620 mi^{2})
- Countries: List: Albania; Bosnia and Herzegovina; Bulgaria; Greece; Kosovo; Montenegro; North Macedonia; Romania; Serbia; Turkey

Conservation
- Conservation status: critical/endangered
- Protected: 27,536 km^{2} (12%)

The Balkan mixed forests are a terrestrial ecoregion of southeastern Europe according to both the WWF and Digital Map of European Ecological Regions by the European Environment Agency. It belongs in the temperate broadleaf and mixed forests biome and the Palearctic realm.

== Geography ==
The Balkan mixed forests cover much of the valleys, plains and mountain slopes of the eastern Balkans, mainly Bulgaria, on different altitude, except higher parts of the Rila-Rhodope and Balkan, Mountains, where they are substituted by the Rodope montane mixed forests. It extends from approximately the Drina valley to the coasts of the Black, Marmara and Aegean Seas and occupy 224,400 km^{2} (86,600 sq. mi) in Albania, Bosnia and Herzegovina, Bulgaria, North Macedonia, Serbia, Romania, Greece, Kosovo and Turkey.

The ecoregion is surrounded by the Euxine-Colchic deciduous forests (in Turkey, Georgia and Bulgaria), Aegean and Western Turkey sclerophyllous and mixed forests (in Greece), Pindus Mountains mixed forests (in Greece, North Macedonia and Albania), Dinaric Mountains mixed forests (in Montenegro and Bosnia and Herzegovina), Pannonian mixed forests (in Bosnia and Herzegovina, Serbia and Romania), Carpathian montane conifer forests, Central European mixed forests (both in Romania), as well as the East European forest steppe and Pontic steppe (both situated in Romania and Bulgaria).

== Climate ==
The climate of the ecoregion is mostly of Köppen's humid subtropical (Cfa) to humid warm summer continental (Dfb) type, with wet winters. Some areas of relatively high rainfall have been considered a temperate rainforest relict.

== Flora ==
Several species of deciduous oaks (most prominently Quercus frainetto Ten., as well as Q. cerris L., Q. pubescens Willd. and others) dominate most of the ecoregion's forests, interspersed higher up mountainsides (above 800–1200 m) mostly with European beech and such conifers as Black pine, Scots pine, Bosnian pine, Macedonian pine, silver fir and Norway spruce. The highest peaks support alpine tundra vegetation. Platanus orientalis is also found in these areas.

Phytogeographically, the ecoregion is shared between parts of the Central European, Illyrian and Euxinian provinces of the Circumboreal Region within the Holarctic Kingdom (according to Armen Takhtajan's delineation).

== See also ==
- List of ecoregions in Bulgaria
- List of ecoregions in Greece
