= Pindus Mountains mixed forests =

European ecological region

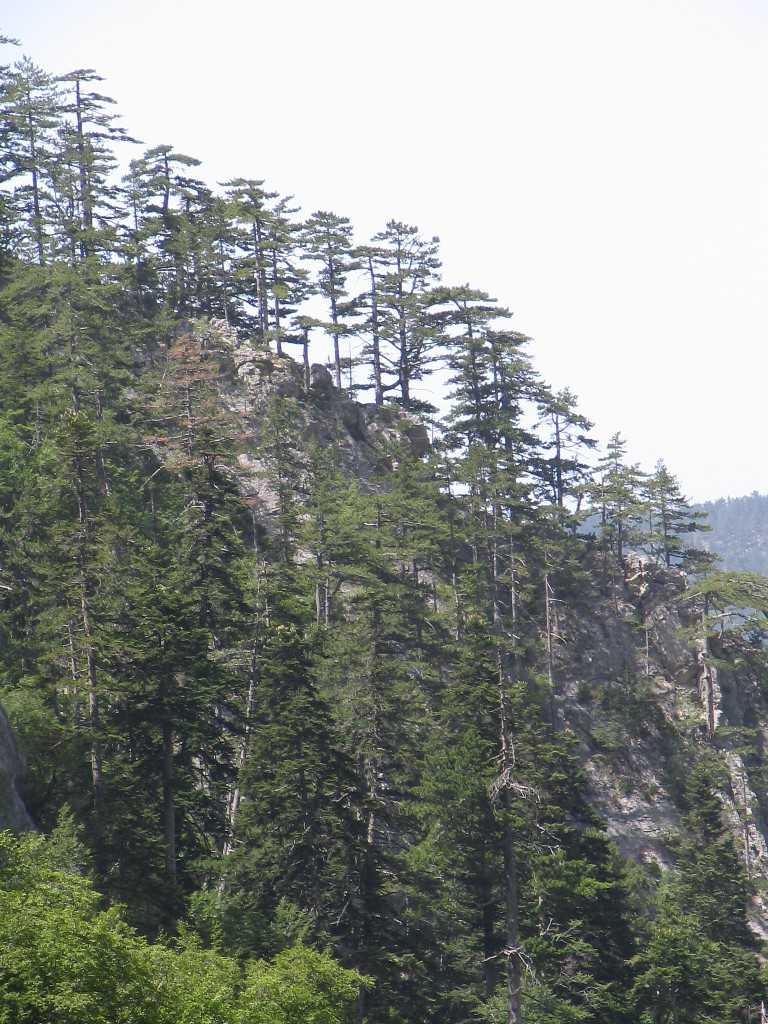
- Forest on Mount Olympus

- Map of ecoregion PA1217

Ecology
- Biome: Mediterranean forests, woodlands, and scrub
- Borders: Dinaric Mountains mixed forests; Balkan mixed forests; Aegean and western Turkey sclerophyllous and mixed forests; Illyrian deciduous forests
- Bird species: 229
- Mammal species: 68

Geography
- Area: 39,500 km^{2} (15,300 mi^{2})
- Countries: Greece; North Macedonia; Albania; Kosovo

Conservation
- Habitat loss: 36.395%
- Protected: 4.32%

The Pindus Mountains mixed forests constitute a terrestrial ecoregion of Europe according to both the WWF and Digital Map of European Ecological Regions by the European Environment Agency. It belongs to the Mediterranean forests, woodlands, and scrub biome, and is in the Palearctic realm.

The Pindus Mountains mixed forests are situated in the montane parts of the southern Balkans in the wide elevational range above 300–500 m. They cover Taygetus on the Peloponnesus in the south, occur in the mountain ranges of Central Greece, Western Macedonia and Epirus (including the Pindus), eastern Albania and the southwestern part of North Macedonia, extend to the Drin River valley in the north and occupy 39,500 km^{2} (15,300 sq. mi) in the three countries.

The ecoregion is landlocked and surrounded by the Aegean and Western Turkey sclerophyllous and mixed forests (in Greece), Illyrian deciduous forests (in Greece and Albania), Dinaric Mountains mixed forests (in Albania to the north of the Drin) and Balkan mixed forests (in Kosovo, North Macedonia and Greece).

The climate of the ecoregion is mostly of Köppen's Mediterranean type with hot summers (Csa).

== Flora ==
Due to the wide elevational range of this ecoregion the highest elevations (above 1,000-1,400 m) are covered with coniferous forests, with a mixed broadleaf zone occurring lower. The coniferous forests are dominated by Pinus nigra subsp. nigra var. pallasiana, Pinus heldreichii, Pinus peuce, Greek fir (Abies cephalonica), A. alba and A. × borisii-regis, with deciduous European beech in the north. Juniperus foetidissima occurs widely near the tree line. The dominant species on the lower elevations are remarkably diverse, including Aesculus hippocastanum (in more damp places) and various deciduous oaks (Quercus frainetto, Q. pubescens, Q. cerris, Q. trojana, Q. petraea). Evergreen oaks, mainly Q. calliprinos, Q. ilex, and other Mediterranean sclerophyll shrubland species are abundant on dry and rocky south-facing slopes.

Near-endemic and endemic species include Greek fir, Natalie's ramonda (Ramonda nathaliae), and Ramonda heldreichii. Carpinus austrobalcanica, a species of hornbeam first described in 2024, is endemic to the Pindus Mountains.

The western Balkan Peninsula contains the most extensive areas of ultramafic rocks in Europe, mostly in a belt stretching from western Bosnia through southern and western Serbia, Montenegro, Kosovo, North Macedonia, and Albania to northern Greece, with the largest areas in the Pindus mountains. Ultramafic soils, which are rich in magnesium, nickel, and other metals, are inhospitable to many plants, and are often home to distinctive plant communities which include species endemic to ultramafic outcrops. Stevanović et al. (2003) found that 335 Balkan endemic plant taxa (species and subspecies) grow on ultramafic substrates, of which 123 are obligate endemics which grow only on ultramafic soils. Greek endemic species found in ultramafic grasslands include Bornmuellera tymphaea, Centaurea lacerata, and Noccaea tymphaea.

Phytogeographically, the ecoregion is shared between the East Mediterranean province of the Mediterranean Region and the Illyrian province of the Circumboreal Region within the Holarctic Kingdom (Armen Takhtajan's delineation).

In recent years, stress from prolonged drought and higher temperatures have made Greek fir trees vulnerable to predation by wood-boring beetles of subfamily Scolytinae, which disrupt the trees' ability to transport water and nutrients from roots to branches and can kill trees. Greek fir die-offs have been reported in the Peloponnesos, Ionian Islands, and the mountains of the Greek mainland.

== Fauna ==
Native large mammals include the brown bear (Ursus arctos), gray wolf (Canis lupus), golden jackal (Canis aureus), and Balkan lynx (Lynx lynx balcanicus). The Balkan chamois (Rupicapra rupicapra balcanicus) inhabits the high mountains of Albania with smaller populations in the Pindus of northern Greece.

== National parks ==
- Chelmos-Vouraikos National Park (Greece)
- Mount Olympus (Greece)
- Mount Parnassus (Greece)
- Mount Oeta (Greece)
- Vikos–Aoös National Park (Greece)
- Pindus National Park (Greece)
- Lake Prespa (Greece)
- Mount Dajt (Albania)
- Lurë National Park (Albania)
- Tomorr (Albania)
- Galičica (North Macedonia)
- Pelister (North Macedonia)
