= Balkan temperate rainforests =

Balkan temperate rainforests are a small portion of the southeastern Alps and Balkan region contain relatively low elevation (< 1600 m ASL) temperate rainforest flora and fauna. Annual rainfall is in excess of 1600 mm, supporting a variety of lichens, tree species, and animal species. These forests, comprising approximately 580,000 hectares, contain a variety of remnant plant and animal species associated with rainforest ecosystems and not found throughout the larger Dinaric Mountains mixed forests ecoregion.

== Stand dynamics ==
As with temperate rainforests elsewhere, fire has relatively less of an influence compared to many other forest types, such as the subalpine of the Western US or the boreal forests. Instead, wind and insects are more important. Small scale gap dynamics are common, as rainfall and storms combine to cause substantial uprooting of individual and small groups of trees. Widespread windstorms occur with some regularity (e.g. less time between events than the lifespan of dominant trees) and cause extensive gap formation, although not complete mortality over large areas. It is difficult to determine large scale disturbance dynamics, however, due to the few areas that have not been extensively modified by humans.

== Examples ==
The Biogradska Gora National Park, in Montenegro, is typical of this region. The unprotected remainder has been subject to extensive forestry and coppicing, although a substantial portion remains Another location contains the virgin "Pecka" forest, with high geological variability. This region is one of the few remaining Dinaric silver fir-beech forests (Omphalodo-Fagetum), on 60 ha on a located on a high karst plateau (45◦ 754’ N, 14◦ 995’ E). Over the last 50 years, silver fir has been rapidly declining relative to beech through natural gap-forming, small scale disturbances.
