= Dinaric Mountains mixed forests =

Terrestrial ecoregion in Southeastern Europe

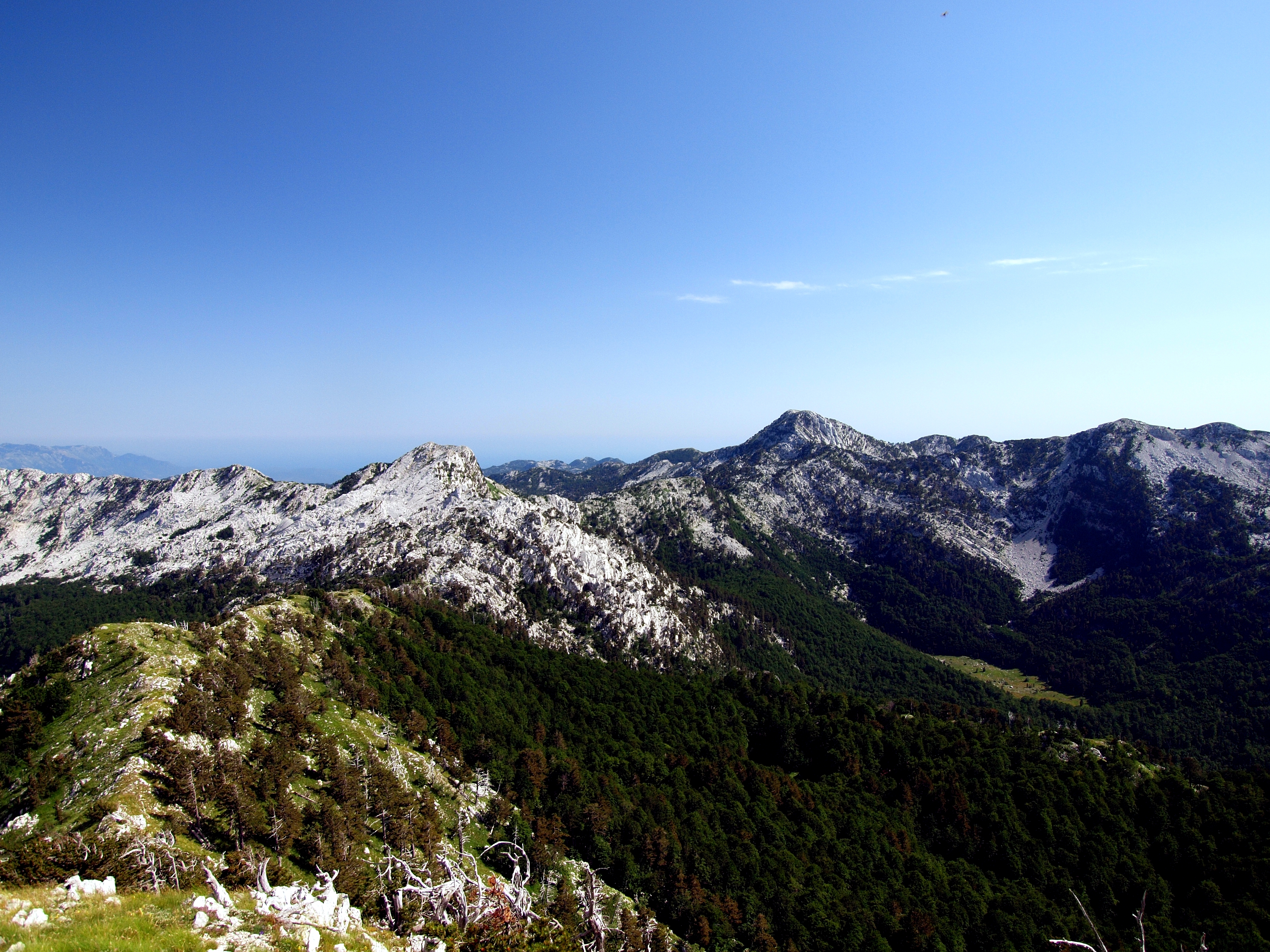
- Montane and Oromediterranean biomes on Orjen, Montenegro

- Location of the ecoregion (in purple)

Ecology
- Realm: Palearctic
- Biome: temperate broadleaf and mixed forests
- Borders: List: Alps conifer and mixed forests; Balkan mixed forests; Illyrian deciduous forests; Pannonian mixed forests; Pindus Mountains mixed forests; Po Basin mixed forests

Geography
- Area: 58,275 km^{2} (22,500 mi^{2})
- Countries: List: Albania; Bosnia and Herzegovina; Croatia; Italy; Kosovo; Montenegro; Serbia; Slovenia

Conservation
- Conservation status: vulnerable
- Global 200: European-Mediterranean montane mixed forest
- Protected: 35,989 km² (5%)

The Dinaric Mountains mixed forests are a terrestrial ecoregion of the temperate broadleaf and mixed forests biome in Southeastern Europe, according to both the WWF and Digital Map of European Ecological Regions by the European Environment Agency. It also is in the Palearctic realm.

== Geography ==
The Dinaric Mountains mixed forests compose the montane forest region of the Dinaric Alps. This mountain range stretches along the eastern coast of the Adriatic Sea, from the Julian Alps in the north to the Drin River in the south, covering an area of 58,200 km^{2} (22,500 sq mi) in Slovenia, Croatia, Bosnia and Herzegovina, Montenegro, Serbia, northeastern Kosovo, northern Albania, and northeastern Italy. The ecoregion includes the coastal Velebit range in northern Dalmatia. The Svilaja and Biokovo ranges of southern Dalmatia are western outliers. The Žumberak Mountains of central Croatia are an eastern outlier.

With high precipitation ranges and an abundance of limestones, karst relief is prominent.

== Climate ==
The climate of the ecoregion is wet and extremely humid. Precipitation ranges are generally above 1500 mm and ranges between 2000 and 3500 mm are common. Maximums measured in the hinterland of the Bay of Kotor surpass annual averages beyond 4500 mm (Crkvice), the highest precipitation ranges in Europe and one of the highest of the Northern Hemisphere. It is part of Köppen's temperate type with humid summers (Cfs) and mountain snow climates (Dfs). Due to snow abundance and avalanching, alpine biotopes are common for all high mountains. Several small glaciers still persist in the Durmitor and Accursed Mountains ranges, the Dinaric Alps' highest massifs.

== Flora ==
The wide altitudinal range of this ecoregion hosts a range of plant communities. The highest elevations (above 1,500 m or 4,900 ft) are covered with conifer forests, with a mixed broadleaf vegetation and occurring at lower elevations.

The conifer zone is dominated by the silver fir, Norway spruce, Serbian spruce, European black pine, mugo pine, and Bosnian pine, with an admixture of European beech. Dinaric calcareous block fir forest grows on limestone outcrops. The dominant species of the lower zones include various deciduous oaks (Quercus frainetto, Q. pubescens, Q. cerris, Quercus robur and Quercus petraea) and the oriental hornbeam (Carpinus orientalis). The South European flowering ash (Fraxinus ornus) marks the submediterranean zone at region below 600–1,000 m or 2,000–3,300 ft (from N to S).

The ecoregion is home to several endemic plants, particularly on the Velebit and Biokovo mountains. The Velebit degenia (Degenia velebitica) grows on scree slopes in the Velebit mountains. Other Velebit endemics include Arenaria orbicularis, Crocus malyi, Euphorbia triflora, Hieracium velebiticum, Hieracium obrovacense, Knautia pectinata, and Knautia velebitica. Biokovo endemics include the Biokovo bellflower (Edraianthus pumilio) and Centaurea biokovensis.

Phytogeographically, the ecoregion is shared between the Adriatic and East Mediterranean provinces of the Mediterranean Region, within the Holarctic Kingdom (according to Armen Takhtajan's delineation).

== Protected areas ==
35,989 km^{2} (13,895 sq mi), or 5%, of the ecoregion is in protected areas. Another 1% of the ecoregion's area has relatively intact but unprotected forests.

Protected areas in the ecoregion include Triglav National Park in Slovenia, Plitvice Lakes National Park in Croatia, Biogradska Gora, Durmitor, and Accursed Mountains national parks in Montenegro, and Alps of Albania National Park in Albania.
