= Rodope montane mixed forests =

Terrestrial ecoregion in southeastern Europe

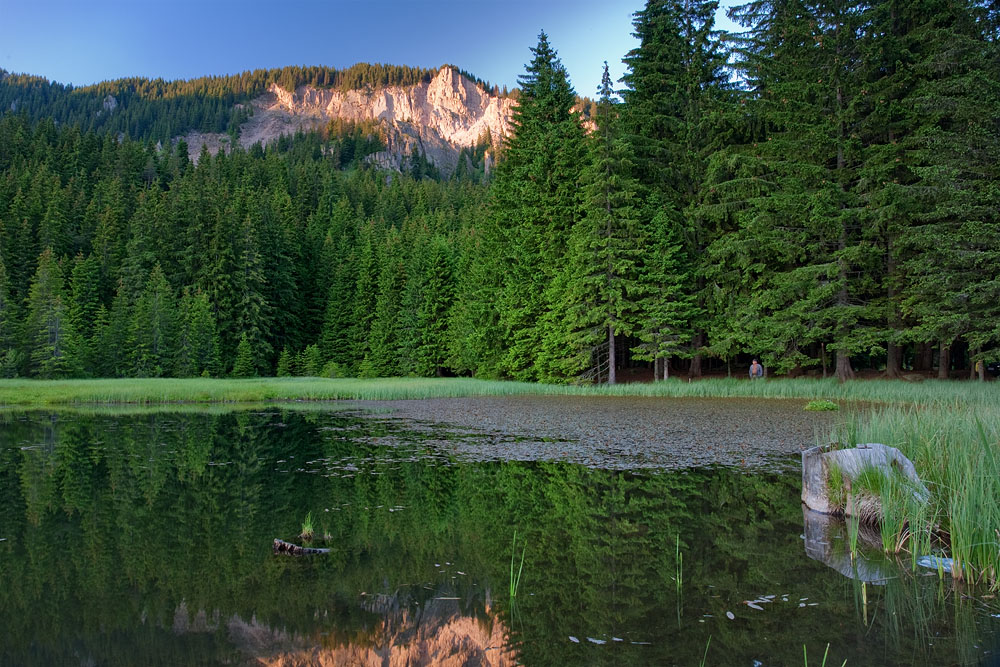
- Forests near Smolyan in the Rhodope Mountains, southern Bulgaria

- Location of the Rodope montane mixed forests

Ecology
- Realm: Palearctic
- Biome: Temperate broadleaf and mixed forests
- Borders: Aegean and Western Turkey sclerophyllous and mixed forests; Balkan mixed forests

Geography
- Area: 31,689 km^{2} (12,235 sq mi)
- Countries: Bulgaria; Greece; North Macedonia; Serbia

Conservation
- Conservation status: critical/endangered
- Global 200: European-Mediterranean montane mixed forest
- Protected: 17,723 km² (56%)

The Rodope montane mixed forests is a terrestrial ecoregion of Europe defined by the WWF. It belongs in the temperate broadleaf and mixed forests biome and the Palearctic realm.

== Geography ==
The Rodope montane mixed forests cover the higher parts of the Balkan Mountains, the Rhodope Mountains, Rila, Pirin, Vitosha, Sredna Gora, Ograzhden and Maleshevo, situated almost entirely in Bulgaria, as well as in some adjacent areas in Greece, North Macedonia and Serbia. They span an area of 31,600 km^{2} and are replaced at lower altitudes by the Balkan mixed forests.

== Flora ==
The number of species of vascular plants in the ecoregion are estimated at 3,000. The lower areas are covered with mixed deciduous woods, most prominently with European beech, Oriental hornbeam, European hornbeam and several oak species. The higher zones are dominated by coniferous forests — Scots pine, Bosnian pine, Macedonian pine, Bulgarian fir, Silver fir, Norway spruce, etc. Platanus orientalis is also found in these areas. The highest altitudes support shrubs, heath and Alpine tundra.

== Fauna ==
The Rodope montane mixed forests are sanctuary to a number of endangered mammal species, such as brown bears, wolves, European pine martens, European otters, wildcats and chamois. More common large mammals include roe deer, wild boars and foxes.

Most of the European birds of prey can be found in the region, including the rare Eastern imperial eagle, cinereous vulture and griffon vulture.

== Protected areas ==
The Rodope montane mixed forests ecoregion holds a total of four national parks, three of them are situated in Bulgaria, and they comprise the Central Balkan National Park, Pirin National Park, a UNESCO World Heritage Site, and Rila National Park. The other one is the Rodopi Mountain Range National Park in Greece.

== See also ==
- List of ecoregions in Bulgaria
