= Rodopi Mountain Range National Park =

National park in Greece

- IUCN category VI (protected area with sustainable use of natural resources)
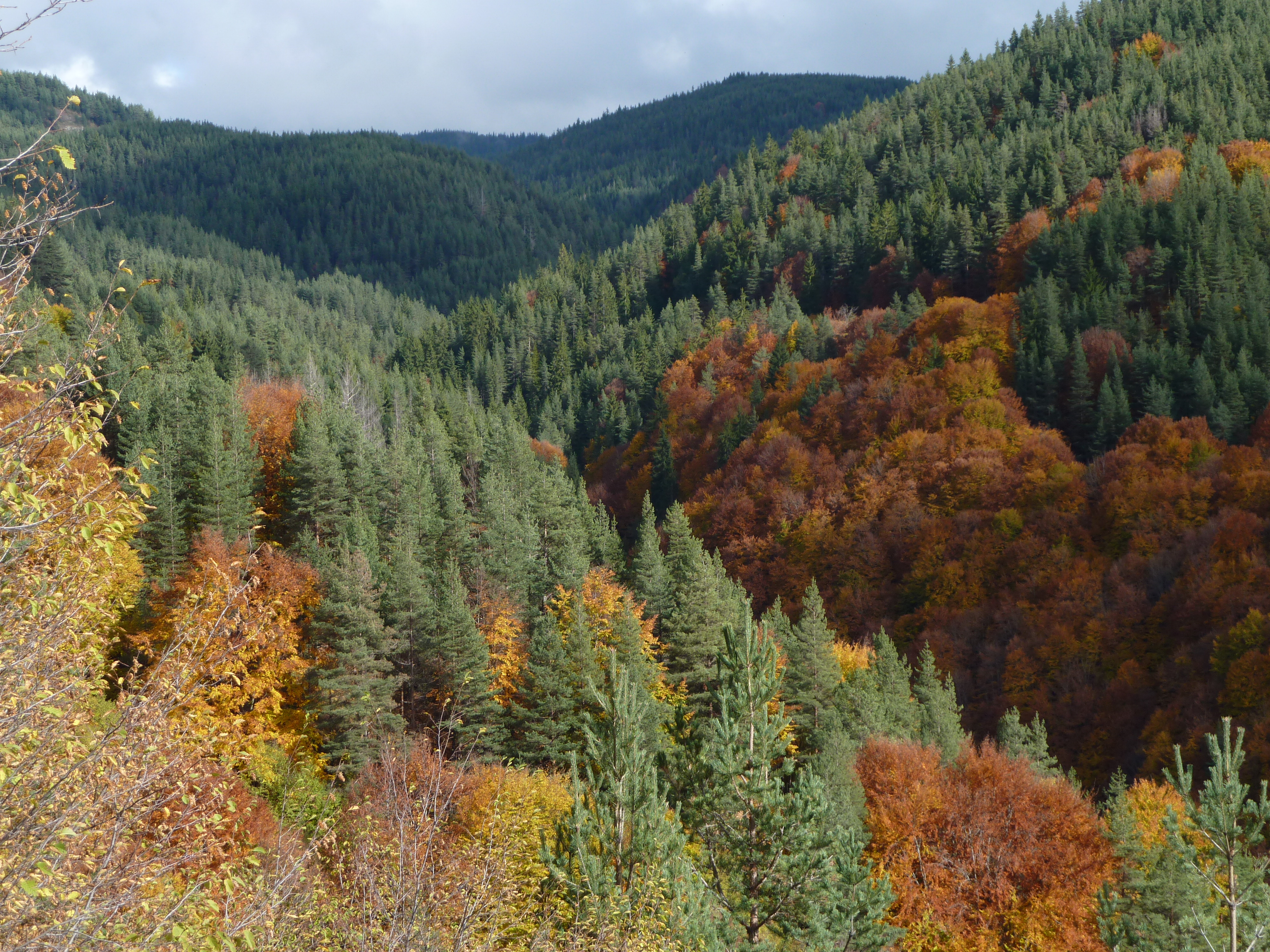

- Location within Greece
- Location: Eastern Macedonia and Thrace, Greece
- Coordinates: 41°28′37″N 24°27′36″E
- Area: 173,150 ha (427,900 acres)
- Established: 2009
- Governing body: National Forest Department (Greek Ministry of Agriculture)

The Rodopi Mountain Range National Park (Greek: Εθνικό Πάρκο Οροσειράς Ροδόπης) is a national park in Greece, situated in the central-west massif of the Greek section of the Rhodope Mountains. It covers an area of approximately 170,000 hectares and includes the largest and most productive forest ecosystems in Greece.

== Geography ==
The park's northern boundaries are along the Greek-Bulgarian borders and they start from a point near Kato Neurokopi, at the regional unit of Drama and they end near Dimario, at the regional unit of Xanthi. Its southern boundaries start from the north-east slopes of Mount Falakro and along Nestos river.

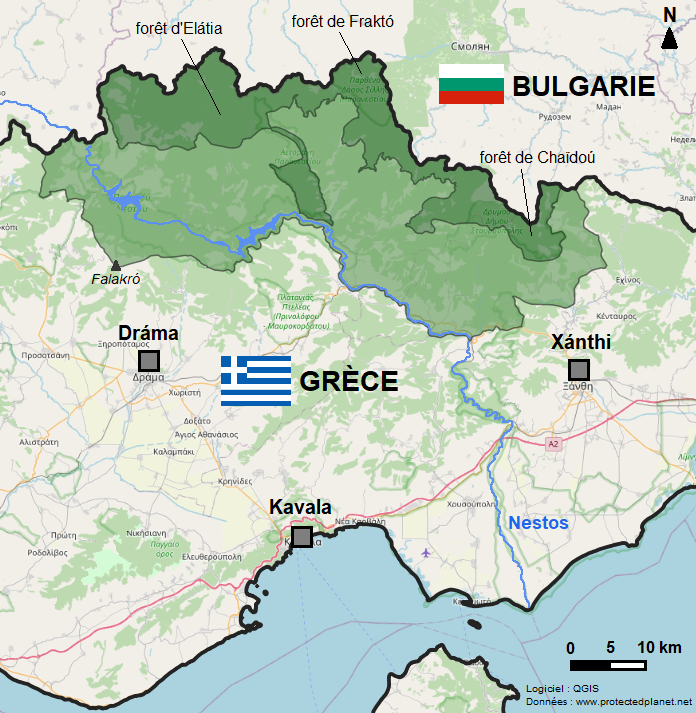
A map of the Rodopi Mountain Range National Park. The highly protected area of the park is highlighted with dark green and the rest of the park with a lighter hue.

The eastern region of the park lies within the Balkan mixed forests ecoregion, while the rest of it covers a part of the Rodope montane mixed forests ecoregion.

== Flora ==
The Rhodope Mountains were not covered with ice during the Pleistocene and as a result they have a really biodiverse flora, with a number of 827 species and 288 subspecies of plants having been recorded in the region. Some of them are endemic and are not found anywhere else in the world, like the Lilium rhodopeum.

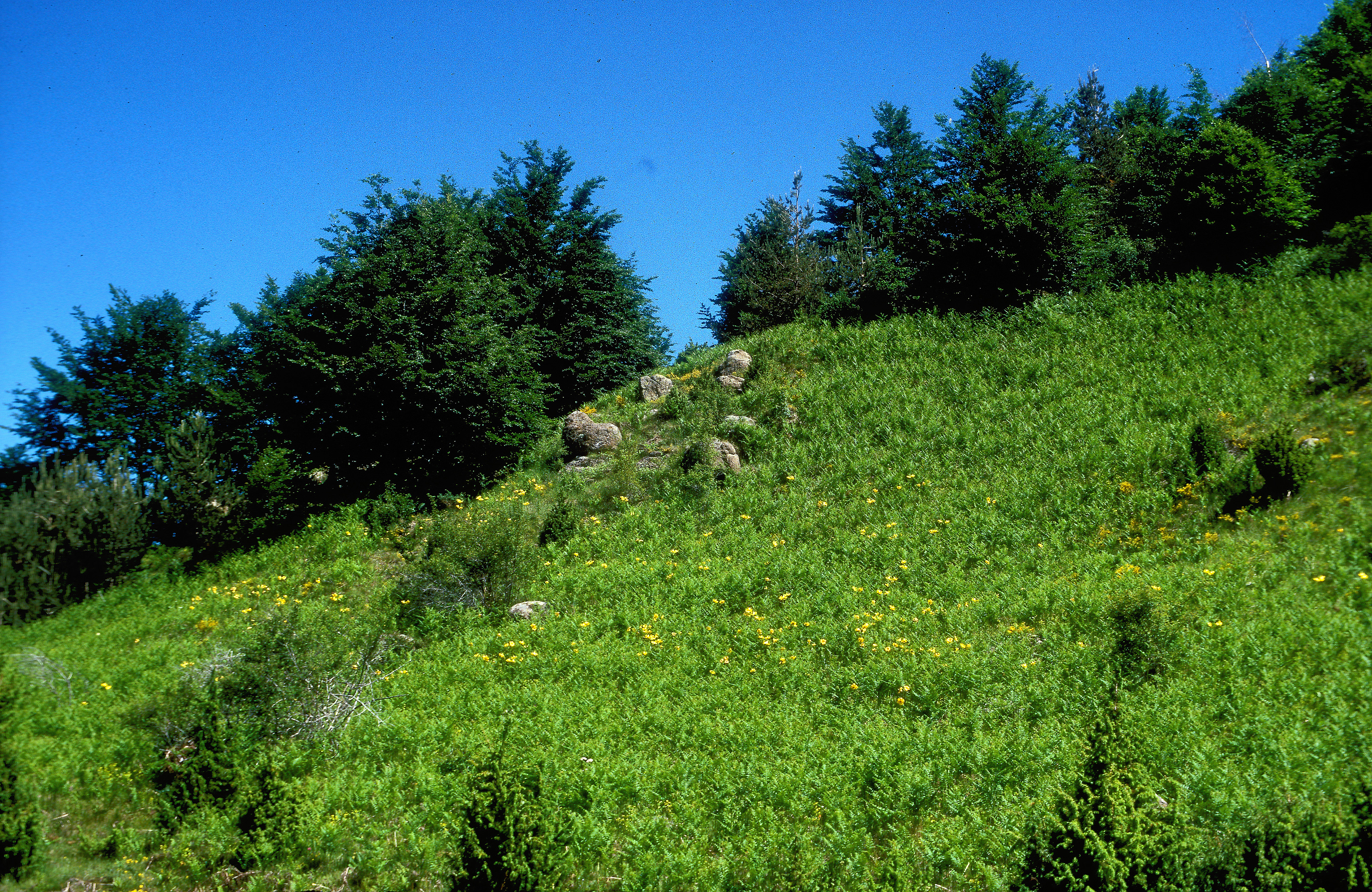
Plants of Lilium rhodopeum near the Livaditis waterfall in the Rodopi Mountain Range National Park

There are four zones of vegetation in the Rodopi Mountain Range National Park. Most of the park is mainly covered with kermes oaks, chestnuts and hornbeams. Another 17.5% of the park is covered predominantly with scots pines, birches and spruces, with these mountains being the southern region that spruce can be found. A different part of the park is mostly represented by ecosystems of beeches and European black pines and there is also a small zone where there are mainly meadows and herbaceous vegetation with sporadic bushes.

== Fauna ==
=== Mammals ===
Many of the iconic European mammals can be found in the Rodopi Mountain Range National Park, like the brown bear, the grey wolf, the wild boar, the red fox, the European wildcat, the Eurasian otter, the Eurasian badger and the roe deer. At a high elevation there are also chamois and the park is also home to a very small population of red deer. These along with many more smaller species bring the total number to 57. The rich diversity of mammals which dwell inside the forests of the park had as result the integration of large areas into the Natura 2000 network.

=== Birds ===
The avifauna of the Rodopi Mountain Range National Park consists of 139 species, many of which are predatory. Some of them are the golden eagle, the peregrine falcon, the Eurasian eagle-owl and the Egyptian vulture, which is listed as endangered in the IUCN Red List. The park is also known for being one of last areas in Greece where the hazel grouse and the western capercaillie live together.

=== Amphibians ===
A total of 14 species of amphibians have been registered in the Rodopi Mountain Range National Park, with the most abundant being the common frog and the fire salamander, while other species like the alpine newt have only been observed in only a very small number of locations in the park.

=== Reptiles ===
26 reptile species are found in the National Park, one of which is threatened, the Greek tortoise, which is listed as vulnerable in the IUCN Red List. The park is also known for being the southernmost region in Europe that the adder is found, the same goes for the sand lizard as well

=== Fishes ===
At the rivers, streams and ponds in the Rodopi Mountain Range National Park there were originally present 11 native species of ichthyofauna, today 9 more have been introduced. The majority of the native species belong to the Cyprinidae family, like the European bittering and the Orpheus dace. Another example is the Phoxinus strymonicus, which is categorized as an endangered species in the IUCN Red List of Threatened Species.

=== Invertebrates ===
Invertebrates of a large number of different species live in the Rodopi Mountain Range National Park, out of which the park is mostly known for its Lepidoptera. Out of the 235 species of Lepidoptera that have ever been recorded in all of Greece, 180 are found in this National Park. Some of these are threatened and have been listed as vulnerable by the IUCN in its Red List. A few examples are the Lycaena ottomanus and the Pseudochazara orestes.

== Gallery ==
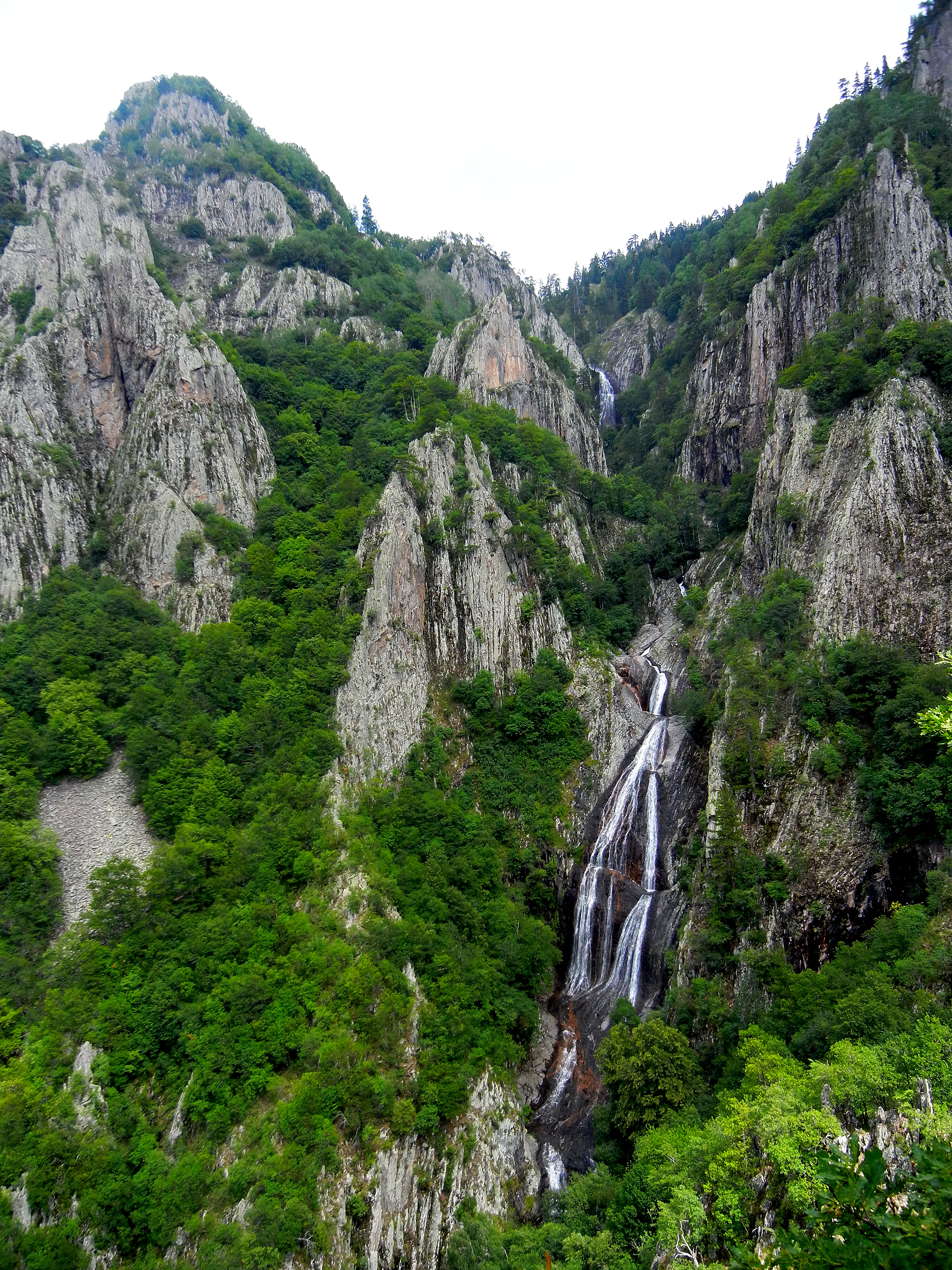

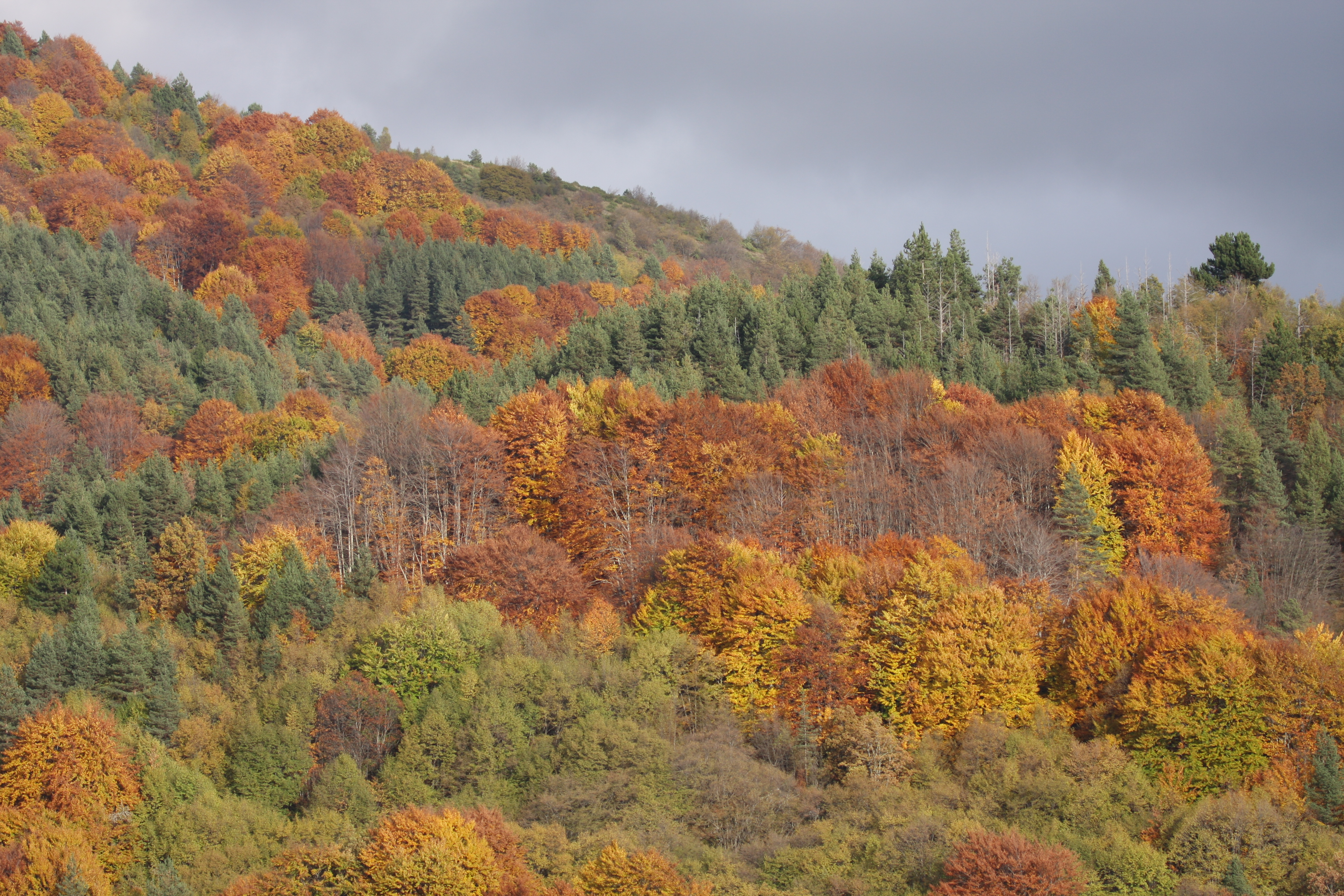

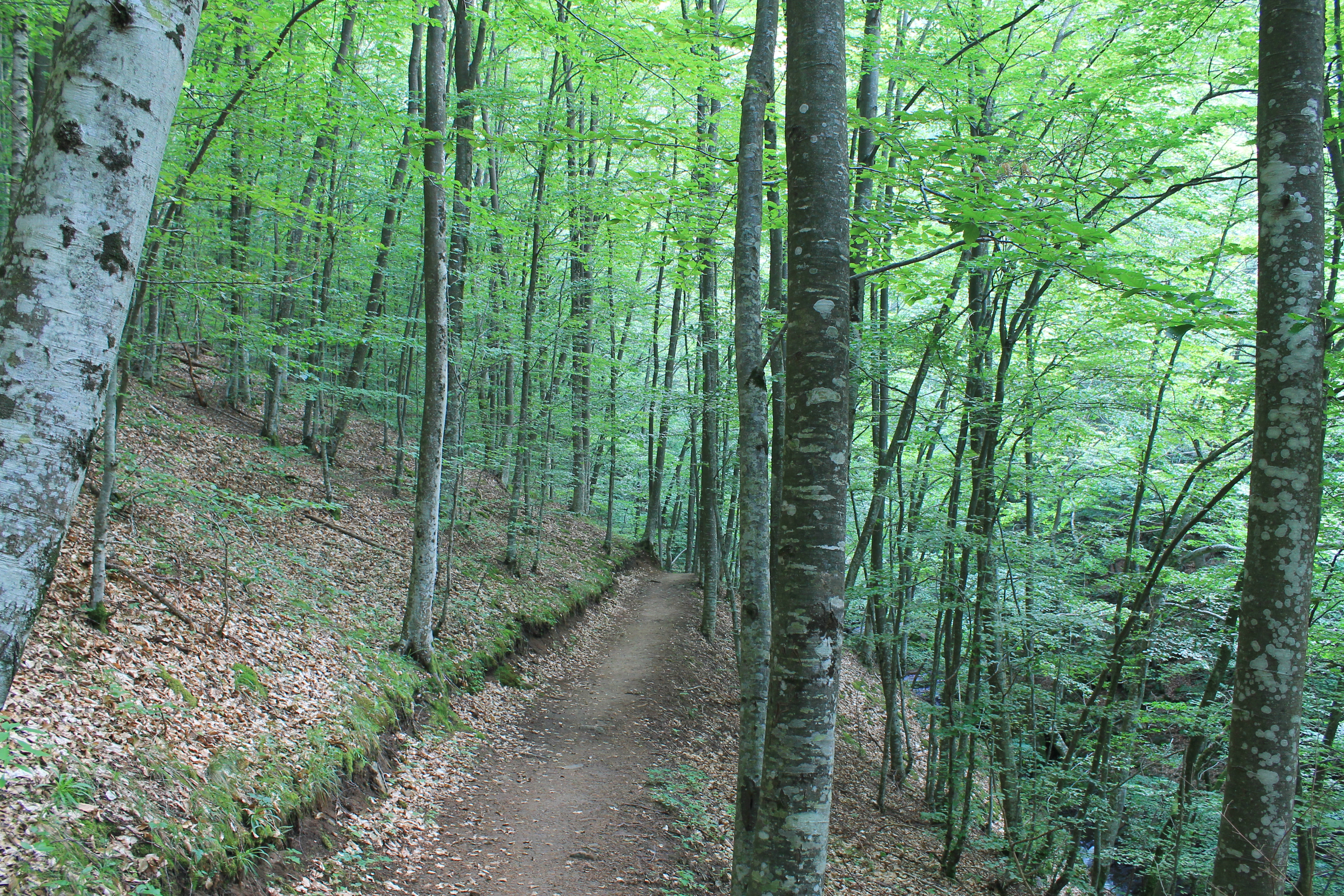

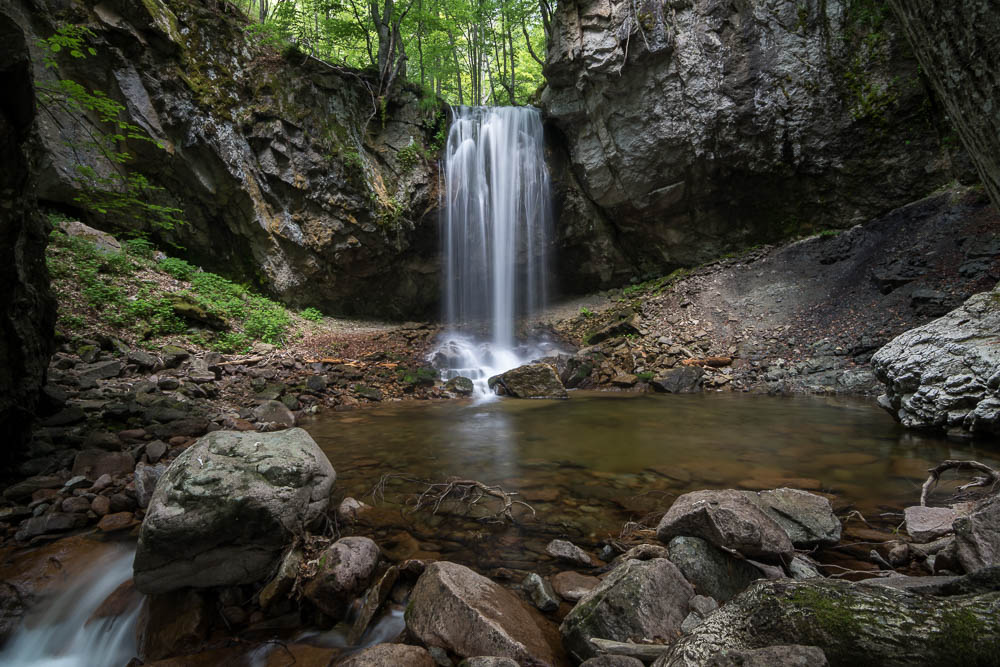

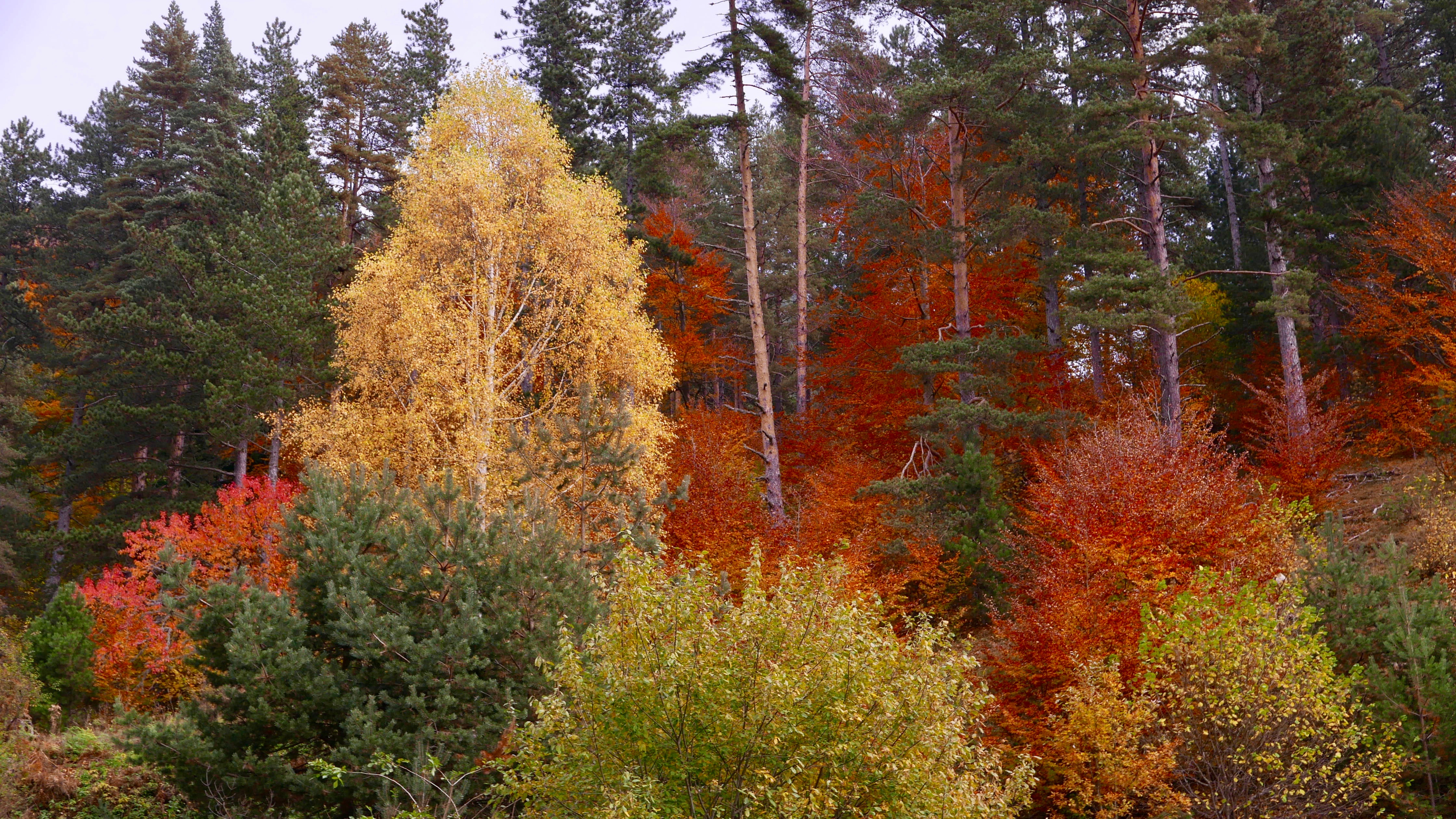
