= Resetnikia =

Scientific classification
- Kingdom: Plantae
- Clade: Tracheophytes
- Clade: Angiosperms
- Clade: Eudicots
- Clade: Rosids
- Order: Brassicales
- Family: Brassicaceae
- Genus: Resetnikia; Španiel, Al-Shehbaz, D.A.German & Marhold
- Species: R. triquetra

Binomial name
- Resetnikia triquetra (DC.) Španiel, Al-Shehbaz, D.A.German & Marhold

Synonyms
- Alyssum triquetrum Port. ex DC., not validly publ.; Farsetia dalmatica Vis.; Farsetia triquetra DC. (1821) (basionym); Fibigia triquetra (DC.) Boiss. ex Prantl; Lunaria scabra Forssk.; Pevalekia triquetra (DC.) Trinajstić

Genus of flowering plants

Resetnikia is a genus of flowering plants belonging to the family Brassicaceae. It includes a single species, Resetnikia triquetra, a perennial or subshrub native to the Adriatic coast of Croatia.
