= Aegean and Western Turkey sclerophyllous and mixed forests =

Ecoregion in Greece, Turkey, and North Macedonia

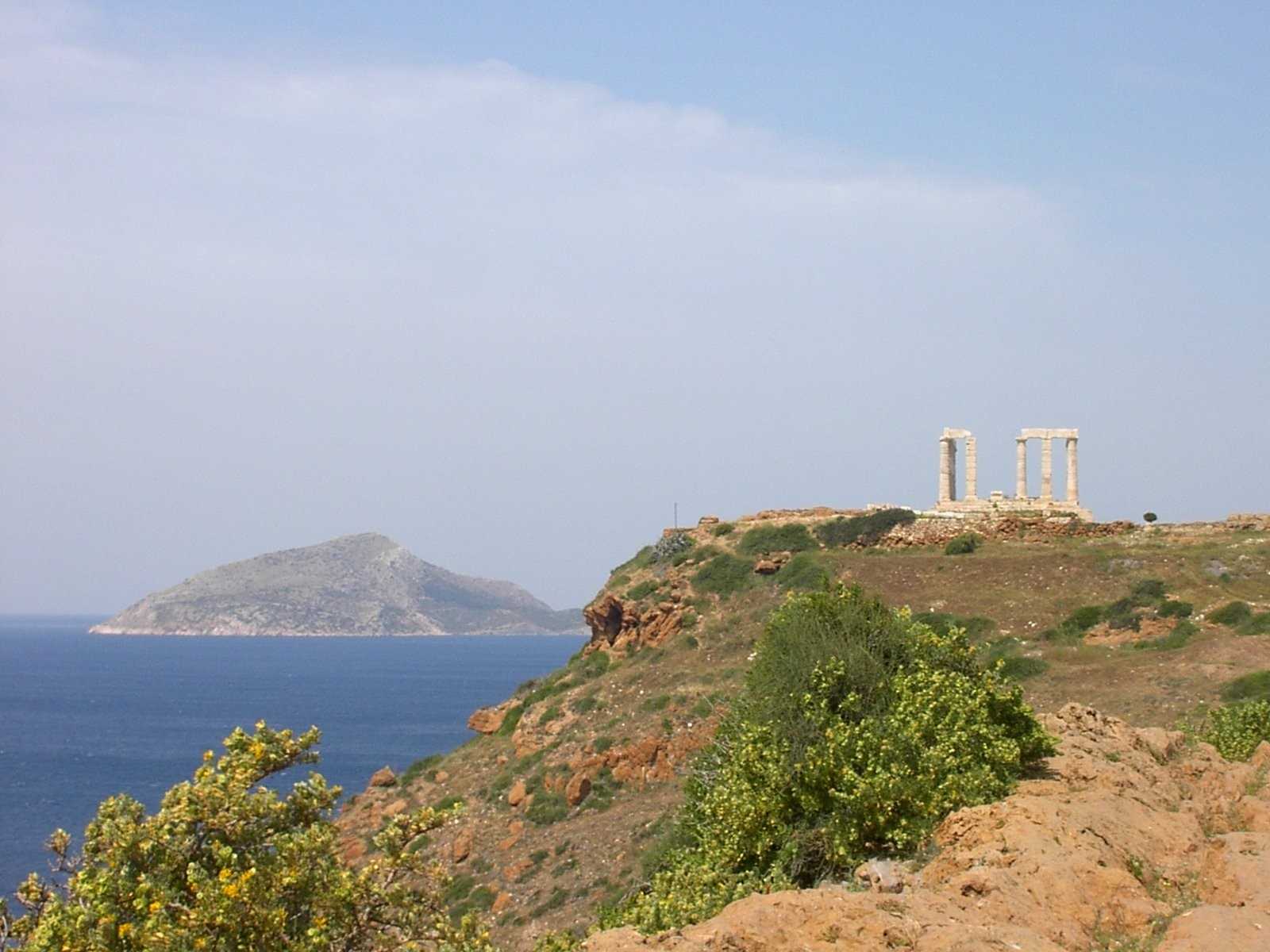
- Landscape at Cape Sounion

- Map of the ecoregion

Ecology
- Realm: Palearctic
- Biome: Mediterranean forests, woodlands, and scrub
- Borders: List: Anatolian conifer and deciduous mixed forests; Balkan mixed forests; Illyrian deciduous forests; Pindus Mountains mixed forests; Southern Anatolian montane conifer and deciduous forests

Geography
- Area: 126,377 km^{2} (48,794 mi^{2})
- Countries: Greece; Turkey; North Macedonia; Bulgaria

Conservation
- Conservation status: critical/endangered
- Protected: 23,189 km^{2} (18%)

The Aegean and Western Turkey sclerophyllous and mixed forests is an ecoregion in the lands around the Aegean Sea. The ecoregion covers most of mainland Greece, the Aegean Islands (except for Crete), the western coast of Turkey, the southern Vardar river valley in North Macedonia, the southern Struma river valley at the extreme south-western corner of Bulgaria, as well as Greece's Heptanese Islands in the Ionian Sea.

The ecoregion has a Mediterranean climate, and is in the Mediterranean forests, woodlands, and scrub biome.

== Climate ==
Climate data for İzmir (1991–2020, extremes 1938–present)
Month	Jan	Feb	Mar	Apr	May	Jun	Jul	Aug	Sep	Oct	Nov	Dec	Year
Record high °C (°F)	22.5 (72.5)	27.0 (80.6)	31.1 (88.0)	32.5 (90.5)	37.6 (99.7)	41.3 (106.3)	43.2 (109.8)	43.0 (109.4)	40.1 (104.2)	36.0 (96.8)	30.3 (86.5)	25.2 (77.4)	43.2 (109.8)
Mean daily maximum °C (°F)	12.7 (54.9)	14.0 (57.2)	17.2 (63.0)	21.3 (70.3)	26.5 (79.7)	31.3 (88.3)	33.8 (92.8)	33.6 (92.5)	29.5 (85.1)	24.6 (76.3)	18.8 (65.8)	14.0 (57.2)	23.1 (73.6)
Daily mean °C (°F)	9.0 (48.2)	9.9 (49.8)	12.4 (54.3)	16.2 (61.2)	21.1 (70.0)	26.0 (78.8)	28.6 (83.5)	28.5 (83.3)	24.2 (75.6)	19.5 (67.1)	14.4 (57.9)	10.5 (50.9)	18.4 (65.1)
Mean daily minimum °C (°F)	6.0 (42.8)	6.6 (43.9)	8.6 (47.5)	11.8 (53.2)	16.2 (61.2)	20.9 (69.6)	23.5 (74.3)	23.7 (74.7)	19.5 (67.1)	15.4 (59.7)	10.9 (51.6)	7.7 (45.9)	14.2 (57.6)
Record low °C (°F)	−8.2 (17.2)	−5.2 (22.6)	−3.8 (25.2)	0.6 (33.1)	4.3 (39.7)	9.5 (49.1)	15.4 (59.7)	11.5 (52.7)	10.0 (50.0)	3.6 (38.5)	−2.9 (26.8)	−4.7 (23.5)	−8.2 (17.2)
Average precipitation mm (inches)	127.5 (5.02)	107.2 (4.22)	77.8 (3.06)	50.1 (1.97)	32.9 (1.30)	14.4 (0.57)	3.0 (0.12)	6.7 (0.26)	23.5 (0.93)	56.5 (2.22)	99.6 (3.92)	131.3 (5.17)	730.5 (28.76)
Average precipitation days	11.57	12.00	10.23	9.00	7.10	3.67	0.67	0.83	3.07	6.67	9.07	13.30	87.2
Average snowy days	0.53	0.56	0.13	0	0	0	0	0	0	0	0	0.19	1.41
Average relative humidity (%)	68.9	67.3	63.5	60.3	57.6	51.6	48.7	50.7	56.0	63.1	67.4	70.1	60.4
Mean monthly sunshine hours	139.5	146.9	204.6	237.0	300.7	345.0	381.3	359.6	291.0	235.6	174.0	130.2	2,945.4
Mean daily sunshine hours	4.5	5.2	6.6	7.9	9.7	11.5	12.3	11.6	9.7	7.6	5.8	4.2	8.0
Source 1: Turkish State Meteorological Service
Source 2: NOAA (humidity, 1991-2020), Meteomanz(snow days 2008-2023)

== Flora ==
The predominant plant communities are maquis, low shrublands, and pine forests.

Maquis is woody shrubland characterized by low trees, shrubs, and herbaceous plants. Maquis species include strawberry tree (Arbutus unedo), Arbutus andrachne, sweet bay (Laurus nobilis), olive (Olea europaea), carob (Ceratonia siliqua), Erica arborea, and Spartium junceum. Maquis includes many aromatic plants, particularly species in the mint family (Lamiaceae).

Low shrublands, known in Greek as phrygana, are characterized by low aromatic shrubs and herbs, including Euphorbia acanthothamnos, Thymus capitatus, and species of Ballota, Cistus, Helichrysum, Phlomis, and Salvia. Phrygana is common on limestone (calcareous) soils, and in areas subject to frequent fires and heavy grazing.

Kermes oak (Quercus coccifera) and holm oak (Quercus ilex) are found in maquis, and also form oak woodlands.

Forests of Turkish pine (Pinus brutia) occur in Anatolia, forests of Aleppo pine (Pinus halepensis) are found in central Greece and the Peloponnese and stone pine (Pinus pinea) grows on stabilized coastal dunes on the Peloponnese.

The oriental sweetgum (Liquidambar orientalis) is endemic to a limited area of southwestern Turkey and the island of Rhodes. The largest remaining stands are near Köyceğiz. Bozpırnal oak (Quercus aucheri) is another endemic tree, native to the islands of Rhodes and Kos and adjacent southwestern coastal Turkey. It has sweet, edible acorns which are collected locally for coffee. The Oriental plane (Platanus orientalis) can be found in certain areas.

== Fauna ==
Mammals in the ecoregion include wild boar (Sus scrofa), red fox (Vulpes vulpes), golden jackal (Canis aureus), wolf (C. lupus), European badger (Meles meles), European hare (Lepus europaeus), northern white-breasted hedgehog (Erinaceus roumanicus), southern white-breasted hedgehog (Erinaceus concolor), Eurasian red squirrel (Sciurus vulgaris), Caucasian squirrel (Sciurus anomalus), and pine marten (Martes martes). The Eurasian lynx (Lynx lynx), European wildcat (Felis sylvestris), and brown bear (Ursus arctos) are now rare in the ecoregion.

The ecoregion is important habitat for several limited-range bird species, including the eastern olivaceous warbler (Hippolais pallida), olive-tree warbler (Hippolais olivetorum), Rüppell's warbler (Curruca rueppelli), masked shrike (Lanius nubicus), cinereous bunting (Emberiza cineracea), and Cretzschmar's bunting (Emberiza caesia).

Characteristic birds of the maquis include the red-legged partridge (Alectoris rufa), rock partridge (A. graeca), chukar partridge (A. chukar), eastern subalpine warbler (Sylvia cantillans), Rüppell's warbler (Curruca ruppeli), cirl bunting (Emberiza cirlus), rock bunting (E. cia), and black-headed bunting (E. melanocephala).

Krüper's nuthatch (Sitta krueperi) is associated with Turkish pine forests in the ecoregion and neighboring ones. Other birds of the pine forests include common European forest species like the Eurasian wren (Troglodytes troglodytes), common blackbird (Turdus merula), common chiffchaff (Phylloscopus collybita), coal tit (Periparus ater), Eurasian blue tit (Cyanistes caeruleus), great tit (Parus major), short-toed treecreeper (Certhia brachydactyla), Eurasian jay (Garrulus glandarius), and common chaffinch (Fringilla coelebs).

Birds associated with the liquidambar forests of western Anatolia include the common nightingale (Luscinia megarhyncos), olivaceous warbler, and Cetti's warbler (Cettia cetti).

== Protected areas ==
As of 2017, 23,189 km^{2}, or 18%, of the ecoregion was in protected areas. Protected areas in Greece include Otea, Parnassus, Parnitha, and Sounion national parks. Protected areas in Turkey include Dilek Peninsula-Büyük Menderes Delta, Marmaris, and Spil Dağı national parks, and Köyceğiz-Dalyan Special Environmental Protection Area.
