= Garrigue =

Shrubland plant community in the Mediterranean

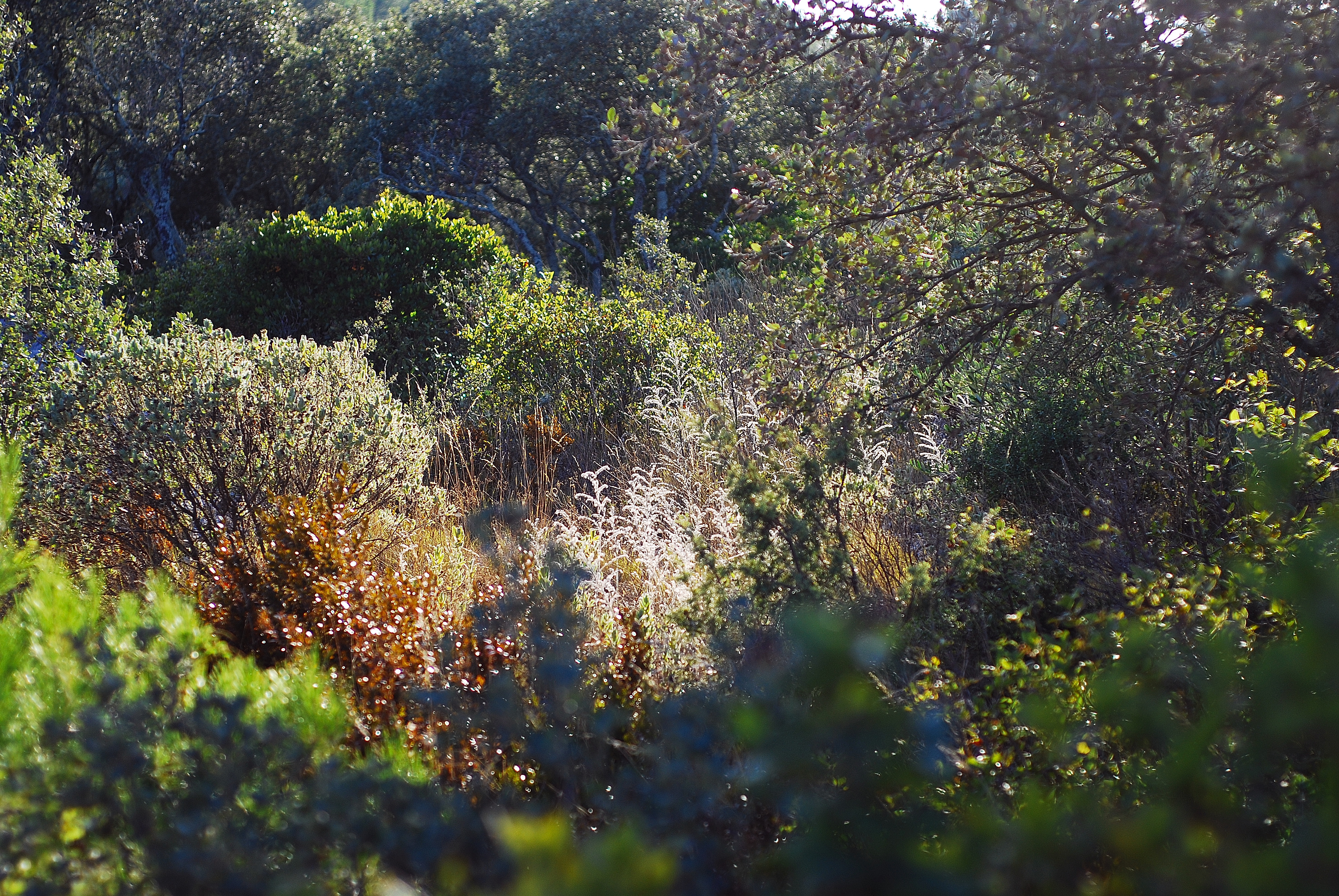
Garrigue in France.

Garrigue or garigue (/ɡəˈriːɡ/ gə-REEG), also known as phrygana (Greek: φρύγανα [ˈfriɣana], n. pl.), is a type of low scrubland ecoregion and plant community in the Mediterranean forests, woodlands, and scrub biome.

It is found on limestone soils in southern France and around the Mediterranean Basin, generally near the seacoast where the moderated Mediterranean climate provides annual summer drought. It is an anthropogenic degradation and succession form of former evergreen oak forests that existed until around 2500 years BCE.

The term has also found its way into haute cuisine, suggestive of the resinous flavours of a garrigue shrubland.

== Habitat and vegetation ==
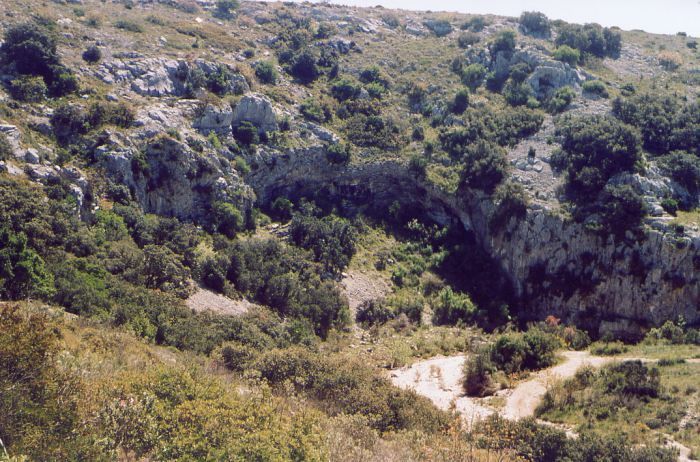
Garrigue in Languedoc, Occitanie.

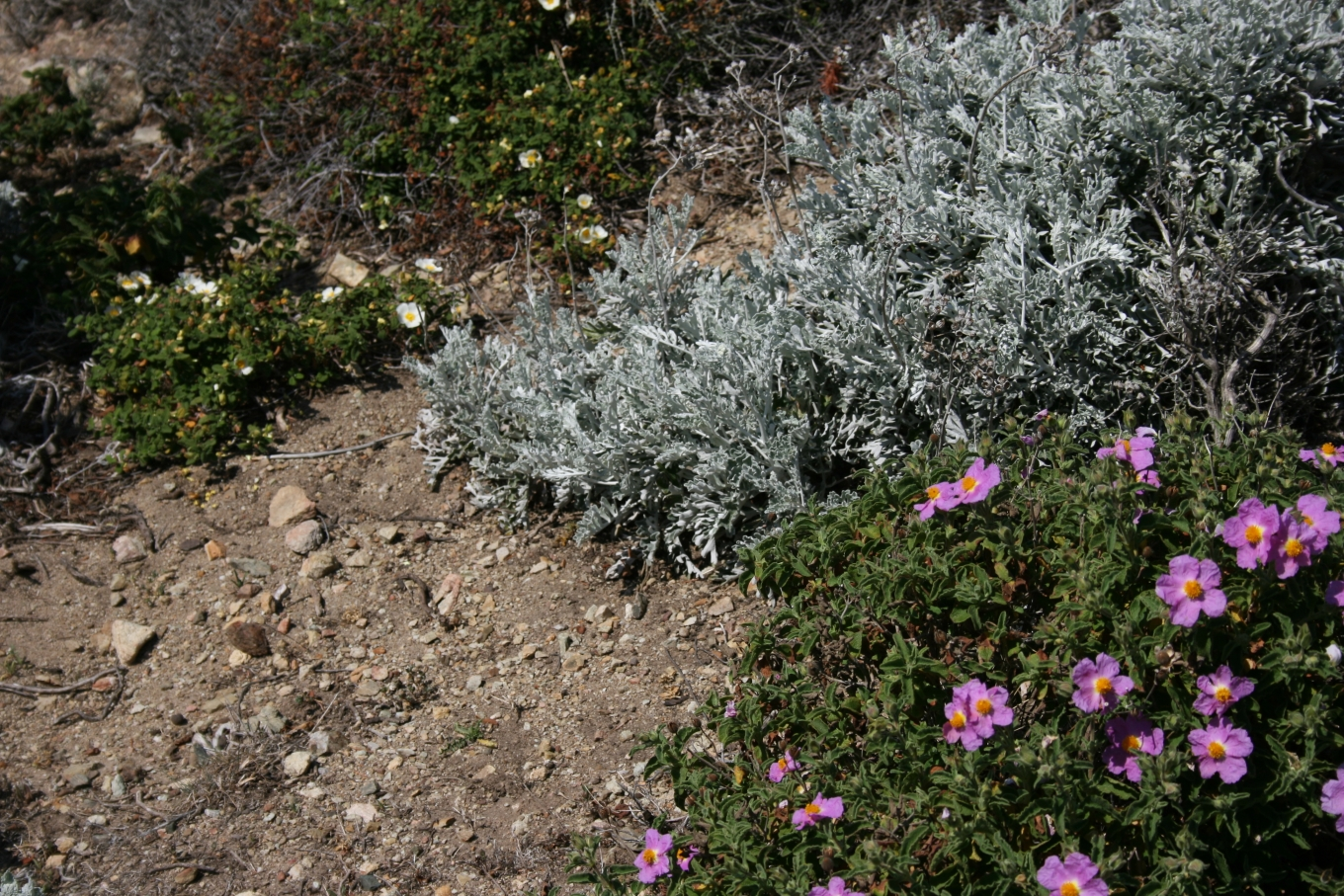
Cistus and Senecio are characteristic plants of the garrigue.

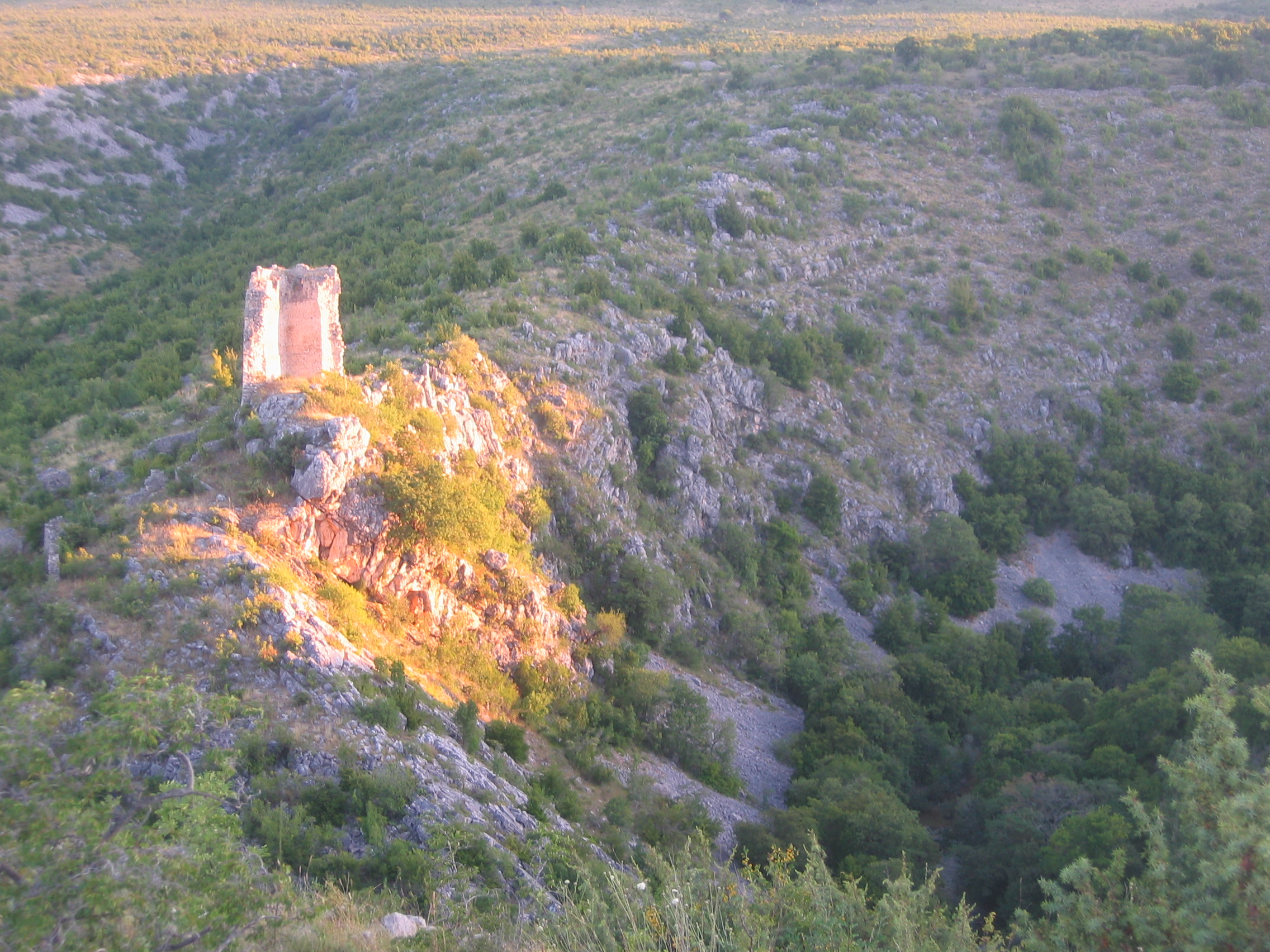
Garig in Bukovica, Croatia.

UNEP World Conservation Monitoring Centre described garrigue as "discontinuous bushy associations of the Mediterranean calcareous plateaus, which have relatively alkaline soils. It is often composed of kermes oak, lavender, thyme, and white cistus. There may be a few isolated trees."

Garrigue is discontinuous with widely spaced bush associations with open spaces, and is often extensive. It is associated with limestone and base rich soils, and calcium associated plants.

Aside from dense thickets of kermes oak that punctuate the garrigue landscape, juniper and stunted holly oaks and holm oaks are the typical trees; aromatic lime-tolerant shrubs such as lavender, sage, rosemary, wild thyme and Artemisia are common garrigue plants.

=== Allelopathy ===
The aromatic oils and soluble monoterpenes of such herbs leached into garrigue soils from leaf litter have been connected with plant allelopathy, which asserts the dominance of a plant over its neighbors, especially annuals, and contributes to the characteristic open spacing and restricted flora in a garrigue. The fines (charred wood and smoke residues, or charcoal dust) of periodic brush fires also have had an effect on the patterning and composition of the garrigues. Clear summer skies and intense solar radiation have induced the evolution of protective physiologies: the familiar glaucous, grayish-green of garrigue landscapes is produced by the protective white hairs and light-diffusing, pebbled surfaces of many leaves typical of garrigue plants.

== Similar ecoregions ==
Garrigue is a common general word for the shrubland habitat ecosystems in southern France along with maquis, which are known elsewhere in the Mediterranean region as matorral and tomillar in Spain, macchia in Italy, phrygana in Greece, garig in Croatia, and garriga in Catalonia or horesh in Israel.

In California a similar Mediterranean climate ecoregion is named chaparral; in Chile it is named the matorral; in South Africa it is named fynbos; and in Australia it is named mallee. All are in the Mediterranean forests, woodlands, and scrub biome.

=== Maquis ===
Both garrigue and maquis are associated with the Mediterranean climate within the Mediterranean region. However, the distinction is not clear and term use is inconsistent.

Maquis shrubland is broadly similar to garrigue, but the vegetation is denser, being composed of numerous closely spaced shrubs. Maquis is associated with siliceous (acid) soils, unlike the relatively alkaline calcareous soils of the garrigue. Its plant communities are often suites associated with holm oak. Calcifuges such as Erica and Calluna are present in the maquis ecoregion.

== Conservation ==
Deforestation of the indigenous oak forest since the Late Bronze Age, for cultivation of olives, vines and grain, the introduction of sheep and especially goats and charcoal-making for heat and iron-working, exposed the land surface to weathering and resulted in erosion of the topsoil. The wild garrigue, then, is a man-formed landscape. The intensity of grazing pressure has had a direct response in the ecotope, reflected today in the decline of goat-pasturing.

== Origin of the word ==
First cited in French in 1546, garrigue is borrowed from Provençal garriga, equivalent to Old French jarrie. The term is most likely related to Gascon carroc "rock" and to Germanic Swiss Karren, a kind of sedimentary rock. These words could derive from a supposed source such as *carra "rock," perhaps a remnant of a pre-Roman language and possibly akin to Basque *karr-, harri "rock." Gaulish and then Latin appear to have borrowed *carra, which evolved into its modern descendants in Romance languages.

== Uses ==
=== Cultivation ===
The dense, thrifty growth of garrigue flora has recommended many of its shrubs and sub-shrubs for uses as ornamental plants in traditional and drought tolerant gardens. Many shrubs and flowering perennials of the garrigue are mainstays of the English "mixed border" of herbaceous and woody plants found in English gardens, and around the world, though often grown under cooler, moister conditions.

Some have become invasive species in the Mediterranean forests, woodlands, and scrub biome's other ecoregions beyond the Mediterranean Basin on other continents, including the California chaparral and woodlands.

=== Viticulture ===
Grapes that are grown in the garrigues region of France are said to produce wines with a "barnyard" or "earthy" tone, or "the herbal scent of lavender that fills the hills of Provence in the summer time." Some wines bottled in Southern France contain the word garrigues as part of their appellation or label name.

== See also ==
- Maquis shrubland
- Sclerophyll
