= Mediterranean forests, woodlands, and scrub =

Habitat defined by the World Wide Fund for Nature

Extent of Mediterranean forests, woodlands, and scrub

Mediterranean forests, woodlands and scrub is a biome defined by the World Wide Fund for Nature. The biome is generally characterized by dry summers and rainy winters, although in some areas rainfall may be uniform. Summers are typically hot in low-lying inland locations, but can be cool near colder seas; while winters are typically mild to cool in low-lying locations, but can be cold in inland and higher locations. These areas cover barely 2% of the planet's land surface but are home to over 20% of the planet's species.

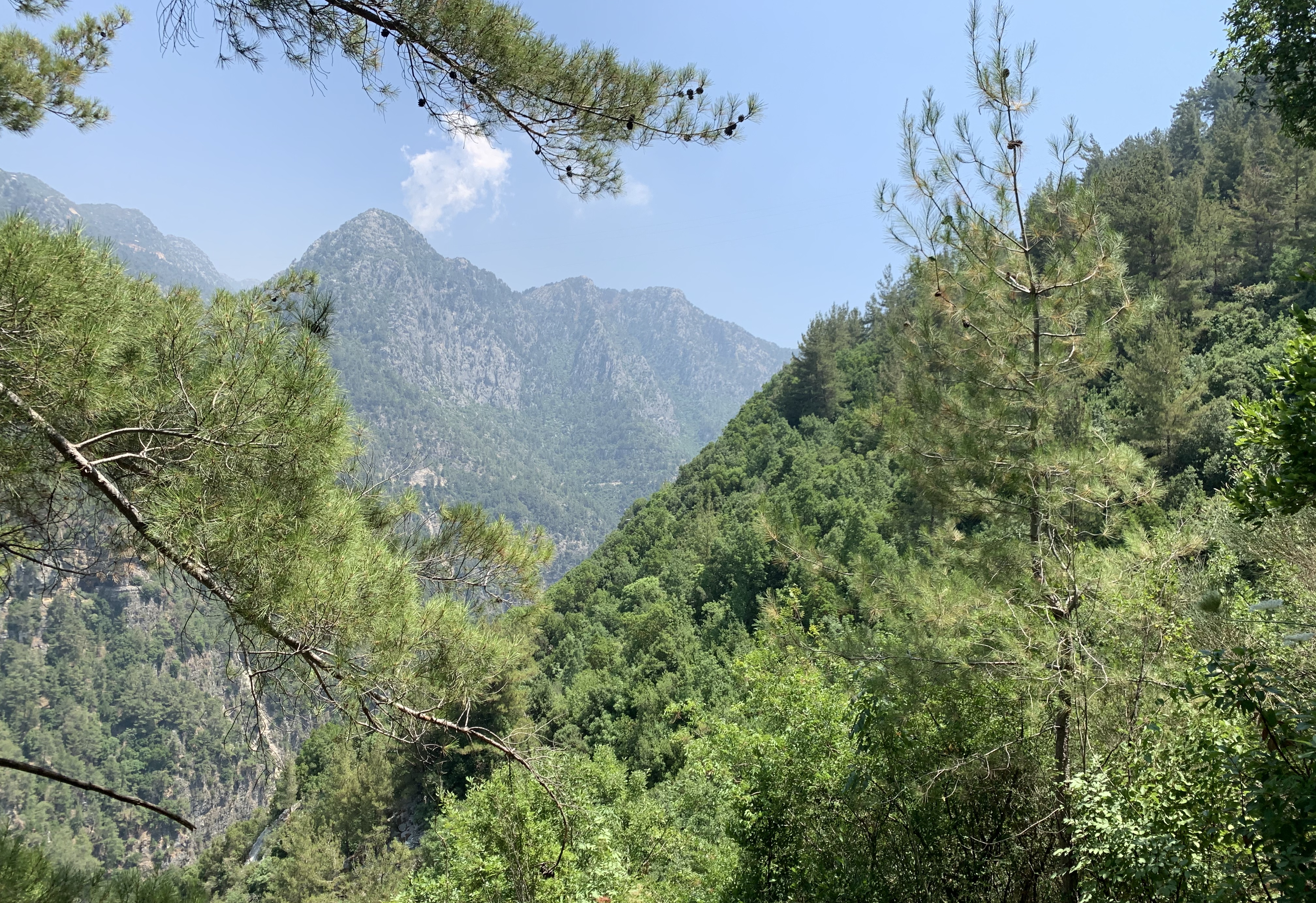
Jabal Moussa Biosphere Reserve in Lebanon

== Distribution ==
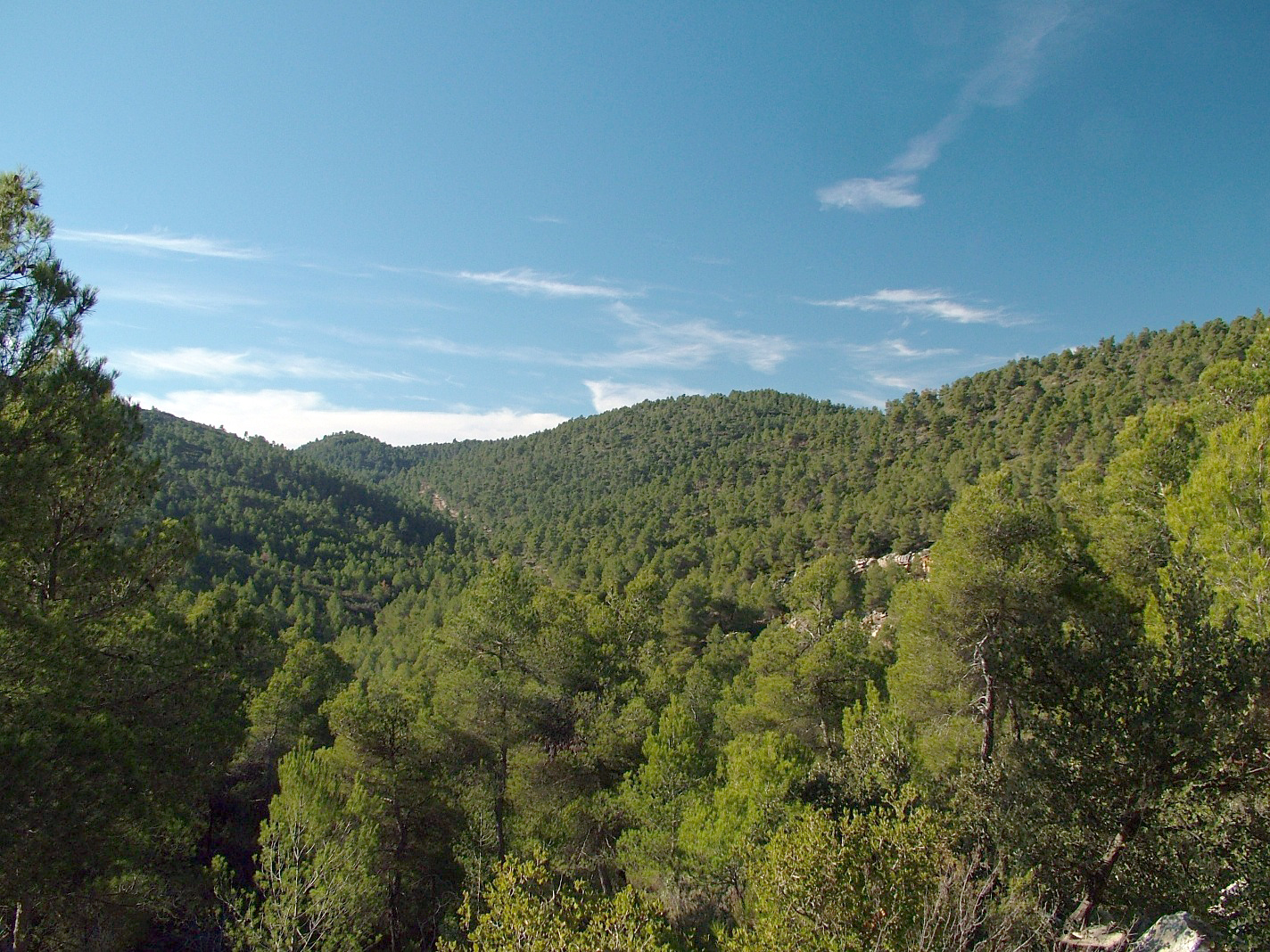
A Mediterranean forest, in the Region of Murcia (Spain).

The Mediterranean forests, woodlands, and scrub biome mostly occurs in, but is not limited to, the Mediterranean climate zones of the mid-latitudes:

- the Mediterranean Basin
- the Chilean Matorral
- the California chaparral and woodlands
- the Fynbos of South Africa
- the Mallee Woodlands and Shrublands of Australia

The biome is not limited to the Mediterranean climate zone. It can also be present in other climate zones (which typically border the Mediterranean climate zone), such as the drier regions of the oceanic and humid subtropical climates, and as well as the lusher areas of the semi-arid climate zone. Non-Mediterranean climate regions that would feature Mediterranean vegetation include the Nile River Valley in Egypt (extending upstream along the riverbanks), parts of the Eastern Cape in South Africa, southeastern Australia, southeastern Azerbaijan, southeastern Turkey, far northern Iraq, the Mazandaran Province in Iran, Central Italy, parts of the Balkans (including Northern Greece), Southern Crimea in Ukraine, as well as Northern and Western Jordan.

== Vegetation ==
Pinus brutia forest in Adana.

Vegetation types range from forests to woodlands, savannas, shrublands, and grasslands; "mosaic habitat" landscapes are common, where differing vegetation types are interleaved with one another in complex patterns created by variations in soil, topography, exposure to wind and sun, and fire history. Much of the woody vegetation in Mediterranean-climate regions is sclerophyll, which means 'hard-leaved' in Greek. Sclerophyllous vegetation generally has small, dark leaves covered with a waxy outer layer to retain moisture in the dry summer months.

Phytogeographers consider the fynbos (South Africa) as a separate floral kingdom because 68% of the 8,600 vascular plant species crowded into its 90,000 square kilometers (35,000 mi^{2}) are endemic and highly distinctive at several taxonomic levels. This is equivalent to about 40% of the plant species of the United States and Canada combined, found within an area the size of the state of Maine. The fynbos and Southwest Australia shrublands have flora that are significantly more diverse than the other ecoregions, although any Mediterranean shrubland is still rich in species and endemics relative to other non-forest ecoregions.

== Biome plant groups ==
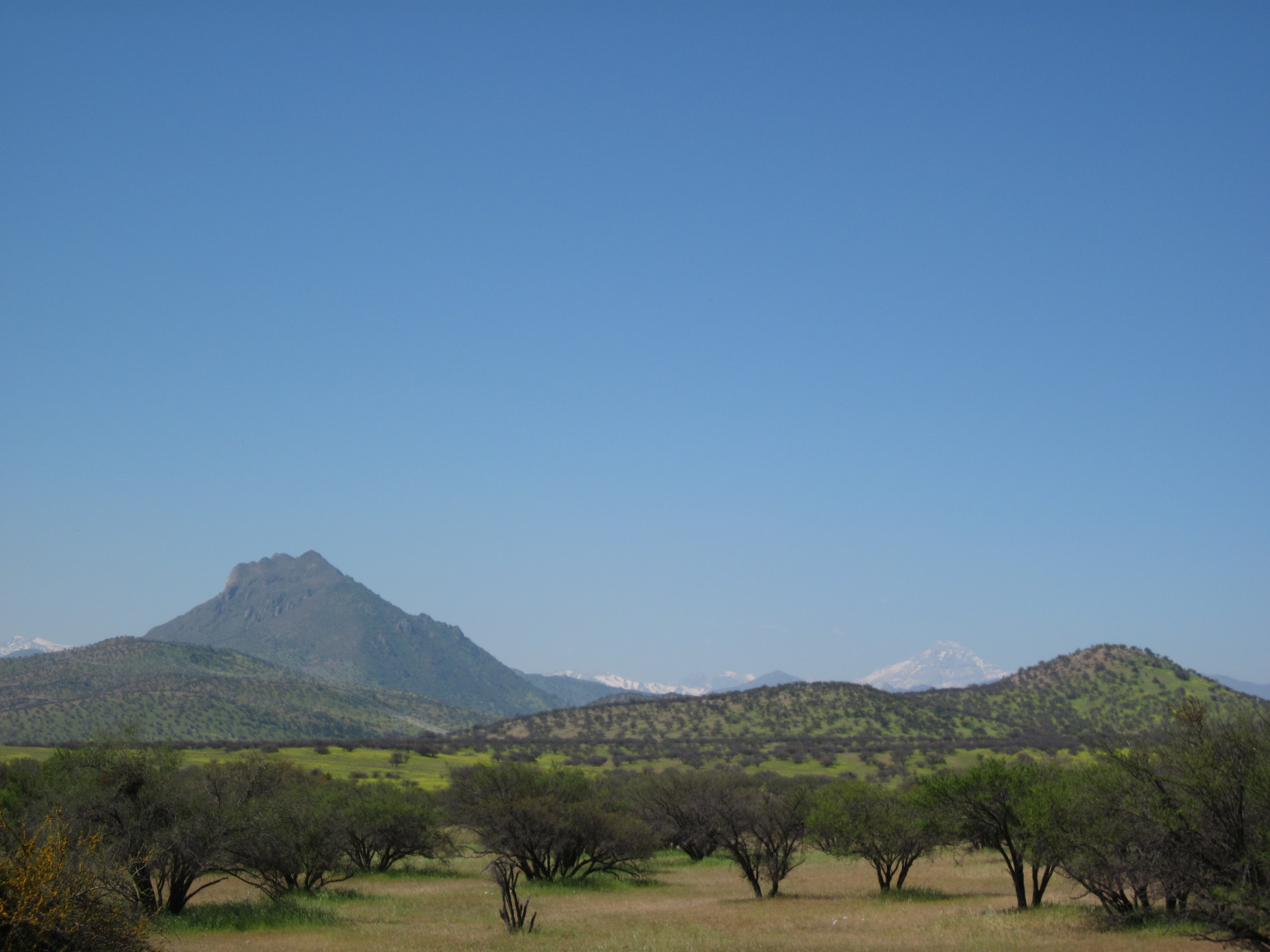
Springtime in Chilean Matorral a few kilometers north of Santiago along the Pan-American Highway

Major plant communities in this biome include:

- Forest: Mediterranean forests are generally composed of broadleaf trees, such as the oak and mixed sclerophyll forests of California and the Mediterranean region, the Eucalyptus forests of Southwest Australia, and the Nothofagus forests of central Chile. Forests are often found in riparian areas, where they receive more summer water. Coniferous forests also occur, especially around the Mediterranean. Pine and deciduous oak forest are widespread across California. Pinus halepensis, lentisk (Pistacia lentiscus), kermes oak (Quercus coccifera) and Chamaerops are found across Spanish Mediterranean forest.
- Woodland: Oak woodlands are characteristic of the Mediterranean Basin and in California. Pine woodlands are also present in the Mediterranean Basin. California additionally has walnut woodlands.
- Savanna and grassland: The California Central Valley grasslands are the largest Mediterranean grassland eco-region, although these grasslands have mostly been converted to agriculture. The remaining woodlands feature mainly oak, walnut and pine. The cork oak savanna in Portugal, known as montado, is a good example of a mediterranean savanna.
- Shrubland: Shrublands are dense thickets of evergreen sclerophyll shrubs and small trees. They are most common near the seacoast, and are often adapted to wind and salt air from the ocean. They are called chaparral (California and southern Portugal), matorral in Chile and southern Spain, garrigue or maquis in France, macchia or gariga in Italy, phrygana in Greece, tomillares in Spain, fynbos, renosterveld, Succulent Karoo, and strandveld in South Africa, kwongan in Southwest Australia and batha in Israel. Northern coastal scrub and coastal sage scrub, also known as soft chaparral, occur near the California coast. In some places shrublands are of the mature vegetation type, and in other places are the result of degradation of former forest or woodland by logging or overgrazing, or disturbance by major fires.

== Fire as a medium of change ==
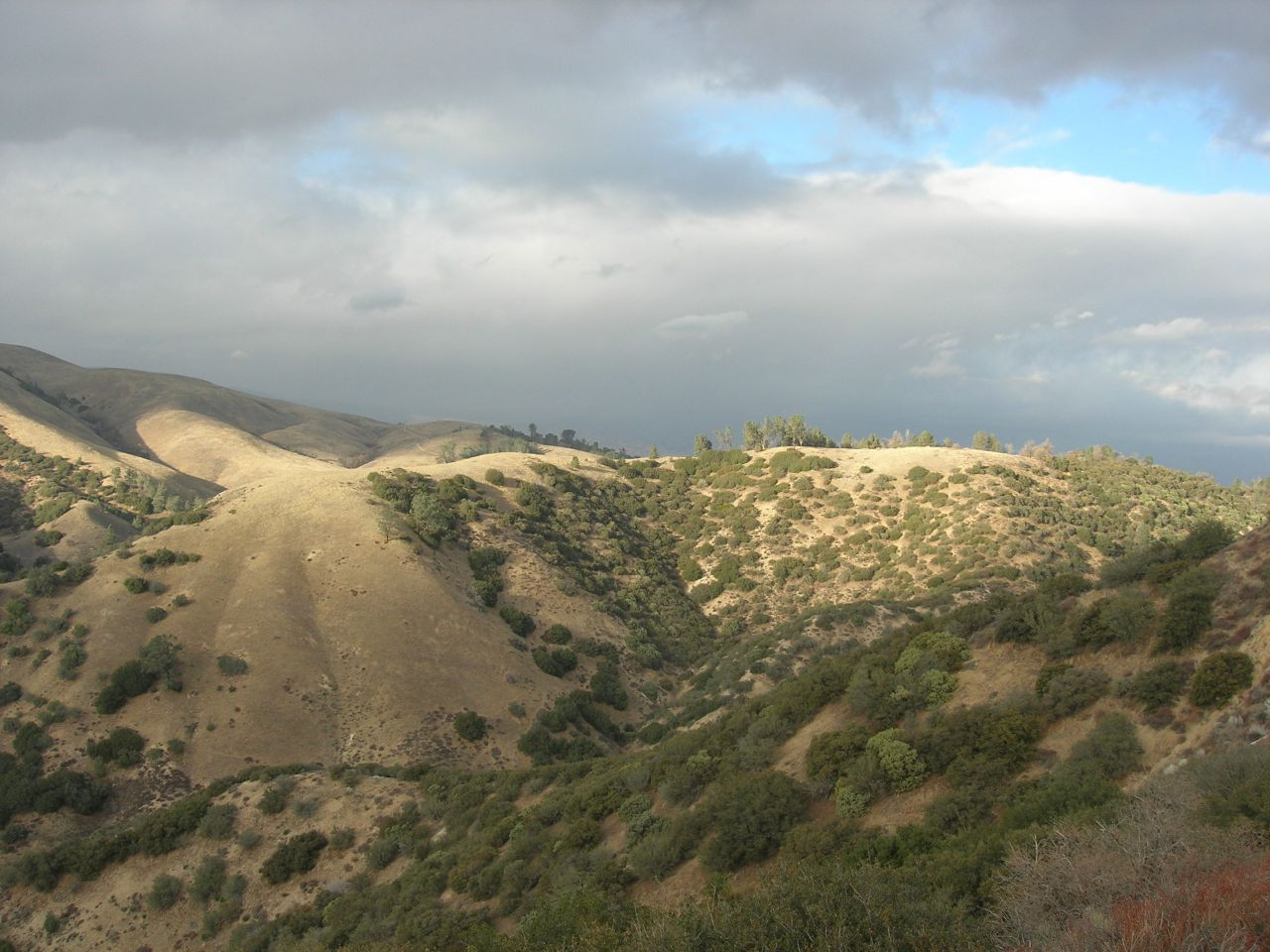
Scrubland of the Sierra Pelona Mountains, Southern California

Fire, both natural and human-caused, has played a large role in shaping the ecology of Mediterranean ecoregions. The hot, dry summers make much of the region prone to fires, and lightning-caused fires occur with some frequency. Many of the plants are pyrophytes, or fire-loving, adapted or even depending on fire for reproduction, recycling of nutrients, and the removal of dead or senescent vegetation. In both the Australian and Californian Mediterranean-climate eco-regions, native peoples used fire extensively to clear brush and trees, making way for the grasses and herbaceous vegetation that supported game animals and useful plants.

The plant communities in these areas adapted to the frequent human-caused fires, and pyrophyte species grew more common and more fire-loving, while plants that were poorly adapted to fire retreated. After European colonization of these regions, fires were suppressed, which has caused some unintended consequences in these ecoregions; fuel builds up, so that when fires do come they are much more devastating, and some species dependent on fire for their reproduction are now threatened. The European shrublands have also been shaped by anthropogenic fire, historically associated with transhumance herding of sheep and goats.

Though adapted to infrequent fires, chaparral plant communities can be eliminated by frequent fires. A high frequency of fire (less than ten years) will result in the loss of obligate seeding shrub species such as Manzanita spp. This high frequency disallows seeder plants to reach their reproductive size before the next fire and the community shifts to a sprouter-dominance. If high frequency fires continue over time, obligate resprouting shrub species can also be eliminated by exhausting their energy reserves below-ground. Today, frequent accidental ignitions can convert chaparral from a native shrubland to non-native annual grassland and drastically reduce species diversity, especially under drought brought about by climate change.

On 25 July 2023, devastating wildfires were burning in at least nine countries across the Mediterranean, including Croatia, Italy, and Portugal, with thousands of firefighters in Europe and North Africa working to contain flames stoked by high temperatures, dry conditions, and strong winds. The wildfires led to casualties, evacuations of thousands of people, and widespread destruction of homes and forests.

== Degradation ==
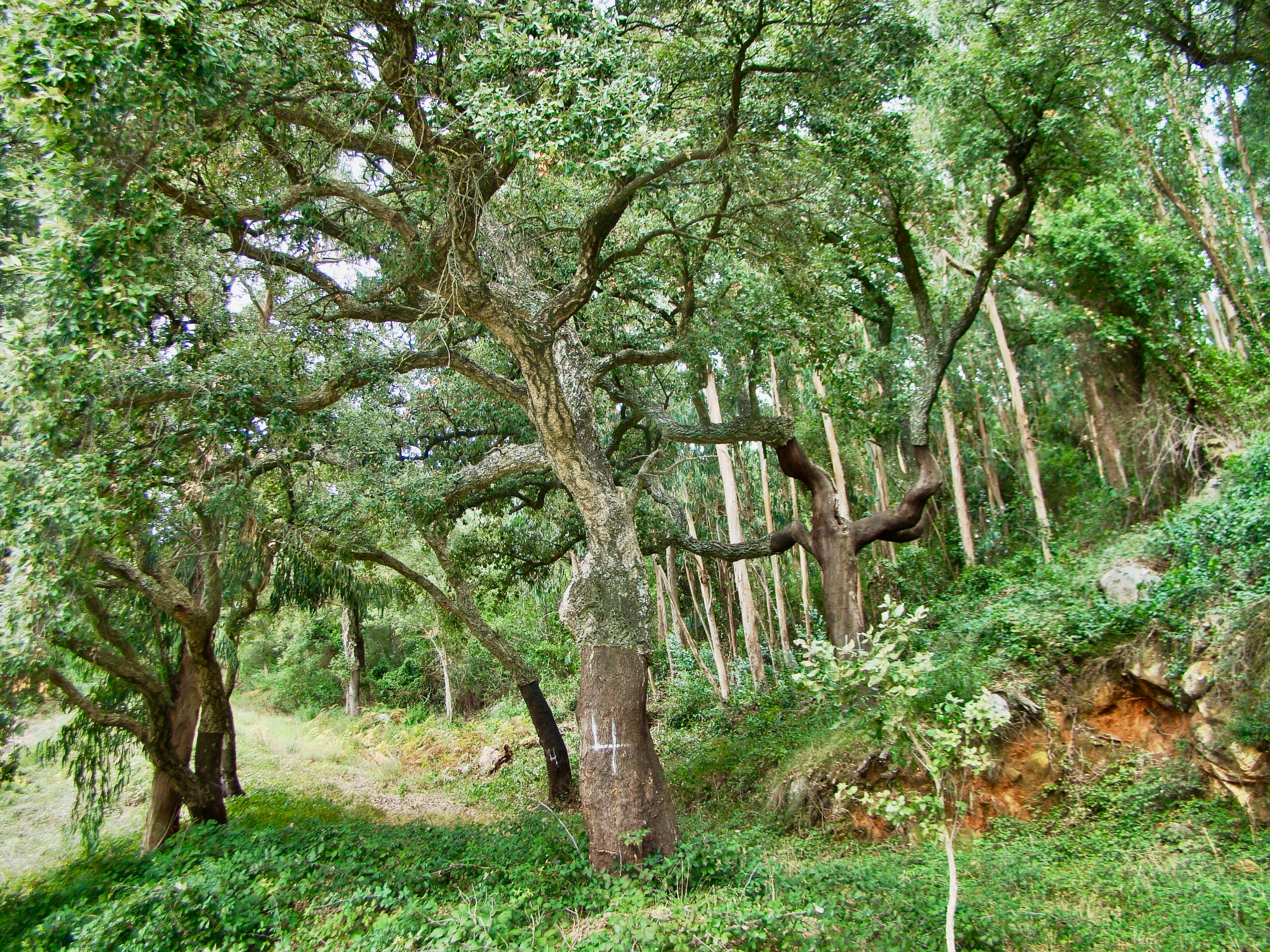
Mediterranean cork oak trees, in Monchique, Algarve, Portugal

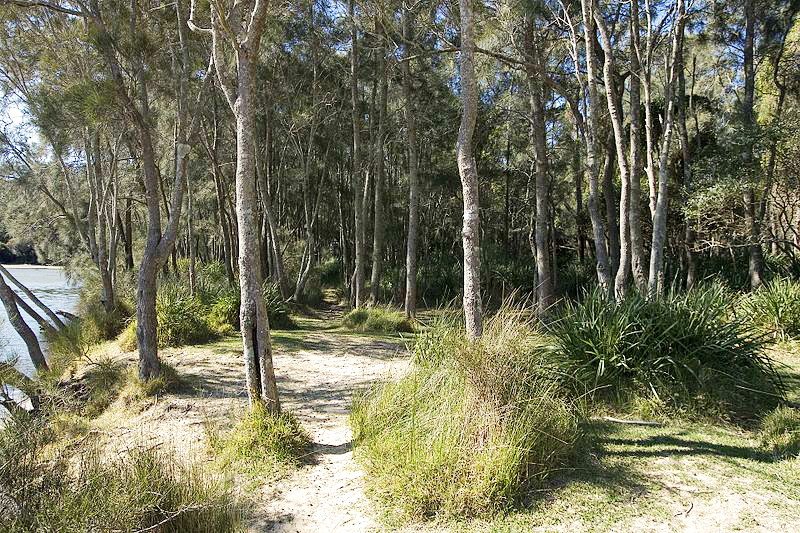
Sclerophyll woodland, Sydney

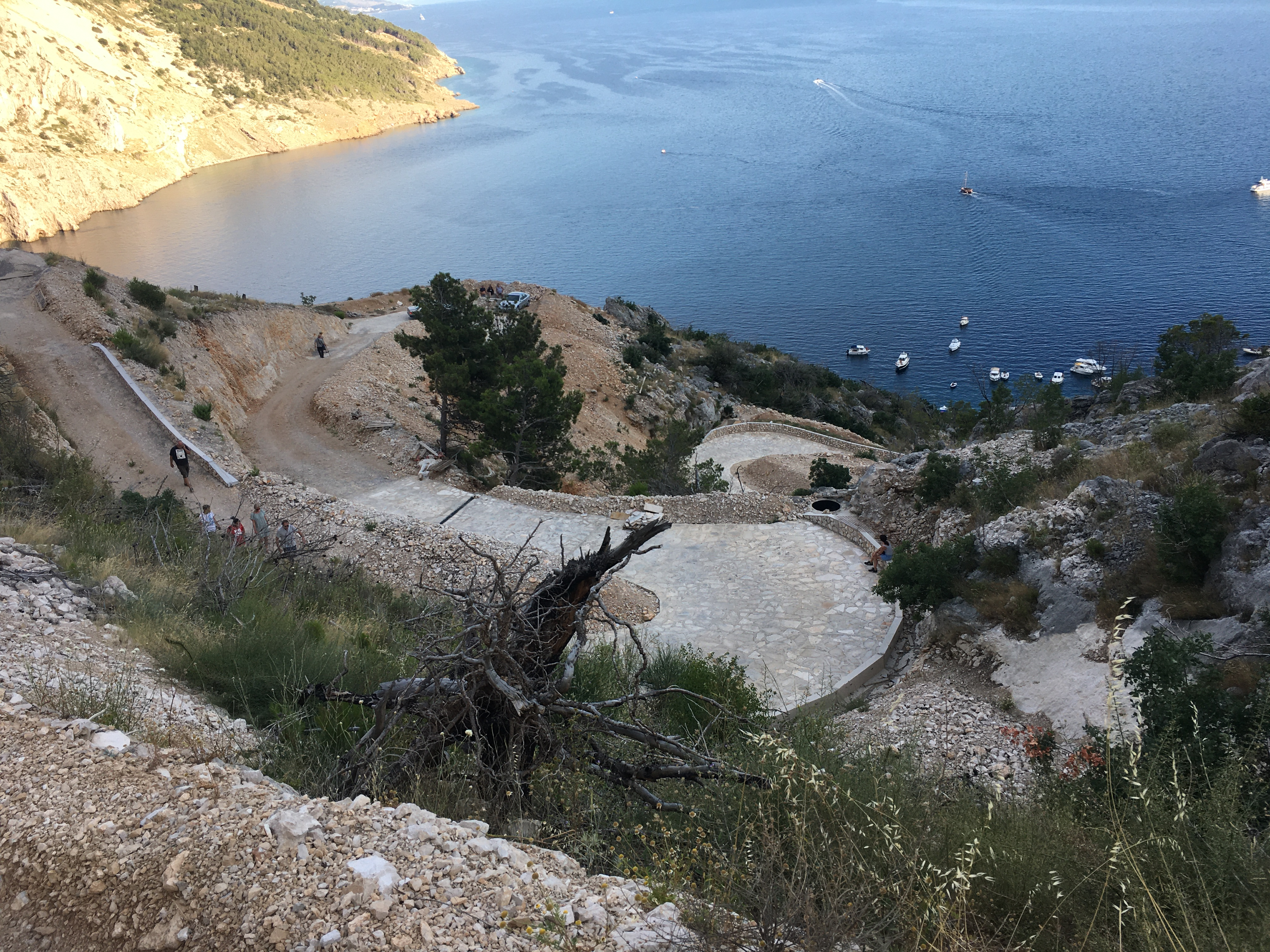
Festival of degradation VRUJA established by activists and artists in 2021 in Dalmatia, Croatia

Mediterranean ecoregions are some of the most endangered and vulnerable on the planet. Many have suffered tremendous degradation and habitat loss through logging, overgrazing, conversion to agriculture, urbanization, fire suppression, and introduction of exotic and invasive species. The ecoregions around the Mediterranean basin and in California have been particularly affected by degradation due to human activity, suffering extensive loss of forests and soil erosion, and many native plants and animals have become extinct or endangered.

== See also ==
- Aegean and Western Turkey sclerophyllous and mixed forests
- Forest Sciences Centre of Catalonia (CTFC)
- Food and Agriculture Organization (Silva mediterranea workgroup)
