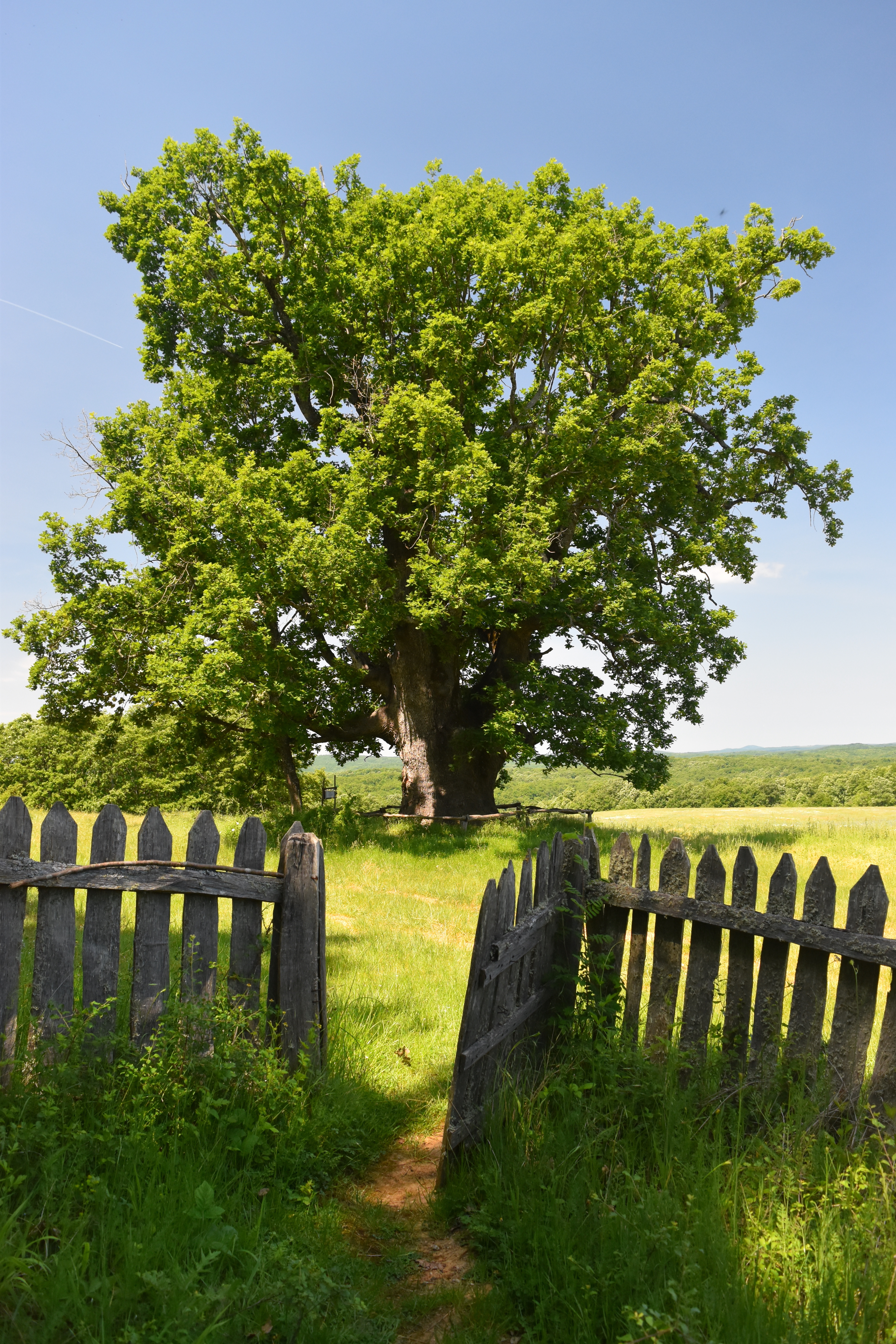

Conservation status
- Least Concern (IUCN 3.1)

Scientific classification
- Kingdom: Plantae
- Clade: Embryophytes
- Clade: Tracheophytes
- Clade: Spermatophytes
- Clade: Angiosperms
- Clade: Eudicots
- Clade: Rosids
- Order: Fagales
- Family: Fagaceae
- Genus: Quercus
- Subgenus: Quercus subg. Quercus
- Section: Quercus sect. Quercus
- Species: Q. frainetto

Binomial name
- Quercus frainetto Ten.
- Distribution map

Synonyms
- List: Quercus byzantina Borbás; Quercus conferta Kit.; Quercus conferta var. calvifrons Borbás; Quercus conferta f. calvifrons (Borbás) D.Bartha; Quercus conferta var. cerrioides Borzì; Quercus conferta f. cerrioides (Borzì) D.Bartha; Quercus conferta f. integriloba (Borza & Cretz.) D.Bartha; Quercus conferta f. latiloba (Beck) D.Bartha; Quercus conferta var. latiloba Beck; Quercus conferta f. lobulata (Halácsy) D.Bartha; Quercus conferta var. lobulata Halácsy; Quercus conferta f. longifolia (Georgescu & Morariu) D.Bartha; Quercus conferta var. macrophyllos (K.Koch) K.Malý; Quercus conferta f. minor (Ten.) D.Bartha; Quercus conferta var. minor Ten.; Quercus conferta f. platyphylla (Gavioli) D.Bartha; Quercus conferta var. pseudodalechampii Rohlena; Quercus conferta f. pseudodalechampii (Rohlena) D.Bartha; Quercus conferta var. racemosa Hausskn.; Quercus conferta var. spectabilis (Kit. ex Simonk.) Borbás; Quercus conferta var. sublobata Borzì; Quercus conferta f. sublobata (Borzì) D.Bartha; Quercus dalechampii var. hungarica (Hubeny) Soó; Quercus esculiformis O.Schwarz; Quercus esculus var. velutinaGriseb.; Quercus farnetto Ten., orth. var.; Quercus frainetto var. conferta (Kit.) A.DC., nom. superfl.; Quercus frainetto subsp. conferta (Kit.) Nyman, nom. superfl.; Quercus frainetto f. hubenyana Mátyás; Quercus frainetto var. hungarica (Hubeny) Borbás; Quercus frainetto f. integriloba Borza & Cretz.; Quercus frainetto f. longifolia Georgescu & Morariu; Quercus frainetto var. minor (Ten.) O.Schwarz; Quercus frainetto f. platyphylla Gavioli; Quercus frainetto f. spectabilis (Kit. ex Simonk.) Mátyás, nom. illeg.; Quercus hungarica Hubeny; Quercus italica Bérenger, nom. superfl.; Quercus italica var. frainetto (Ten.) Bérenger, nom. superfl.; Quercus pannonica Endl.; Quercus pyrenaica var. macrophyllos K.Koch; Quercus sessiliflora f. conferta (Kit.) Vuk.; Quercus slavonica Kit. ex Borbás; Quercus spectabilis Kit. ex Simonk.; Quercus toza subsp. conferta (Kit.) Nyman; Quercus toza var. spectabilis (Kit. ex Simonk.) Nyman

= Quercus frainetto =

Species of oak tree

Quercus frainetto (synonyms Quercus conferta, Quercus farnetto), commonly known as the Hungarian oak, is a species of oak, native to southeastern Europe (parts of Italy, the Balkans, parts of Hungary, Romania) and Turkey. It is classified in Quercus sect. Quercus.

== Description ==
Quercus frainetto is a large deciduous tree, reaching heights of 38 metres (125 feet) tall by 20 m (66 ft) broad, with a trunk girth of nearly 2 m (7 ft). The bark is light gray in colour and cracks into small square cracking plates. The buds are large, long and pointed, shiny russet or light brown in colour with minute tomentum. The twigs are stout and covered with russet upward pointed hairs.

The leaves are large, 14–25 centimetres (6–10 inches) long, occasionally up to 33 cm (13 in), variable in shape, divided into 6–10 very deep parallel lobes which are usually divided into sublobes. The leaf stalks are usually short, 2–6 millimetres (3/32–1/4 inch), rarely to 22 mm, long. The leaves are widest close to the apex, which is broad and short pointed. The base of the leaf usually has auricles which sometimes overlap the twig. The light yellow green expanding leaves turn rich dark green by the beginning of summer. The leaves are covered with minute russet hairs, especially the lower surface. The leaves are concentrated at the ends of twigs. The leaves turn brown, russet or yellow in fall and sometimes remain attached to the twigs until the following spring.

The light brown acorns mature in about 6 months. They are 15–35 mm (5/8–1 3/8 in) long, egg shaped, usually with a blunt apex. The acorn cup is covered with long overlapping scales and russet hairs. The acorns tend to concentrate in groups of two to eight at the ends of twigs.

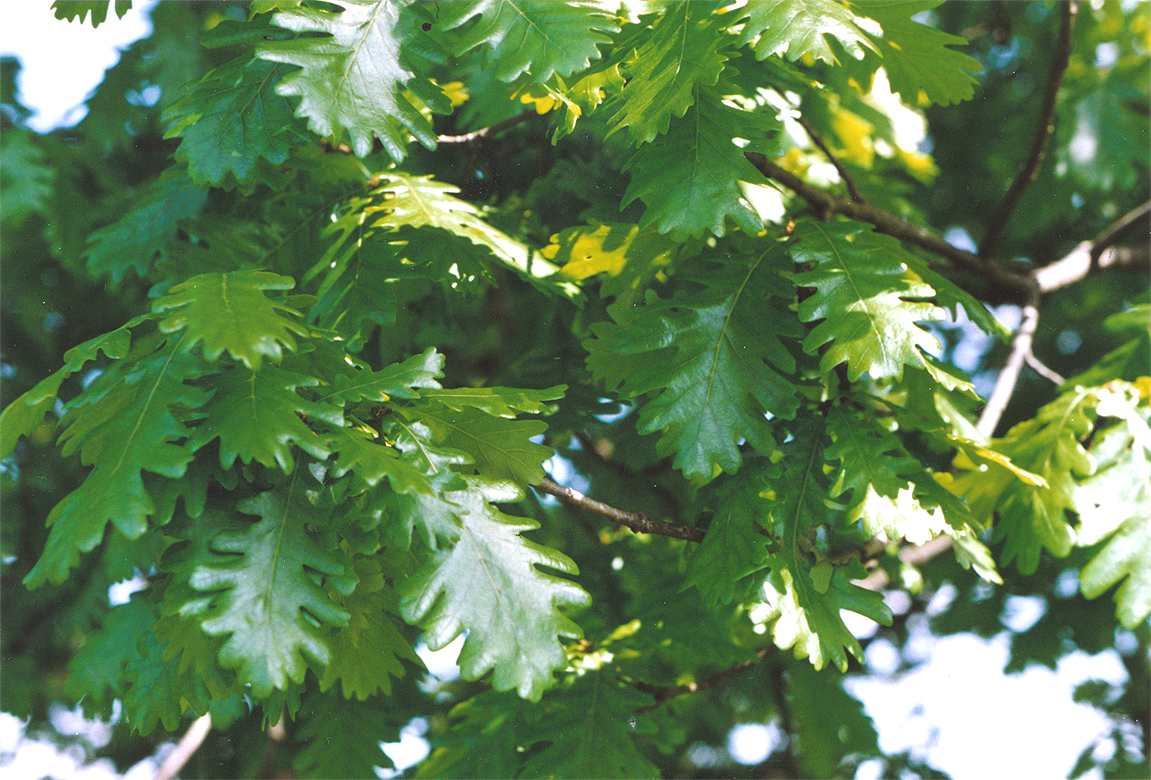
Leaves, Kew Gardens

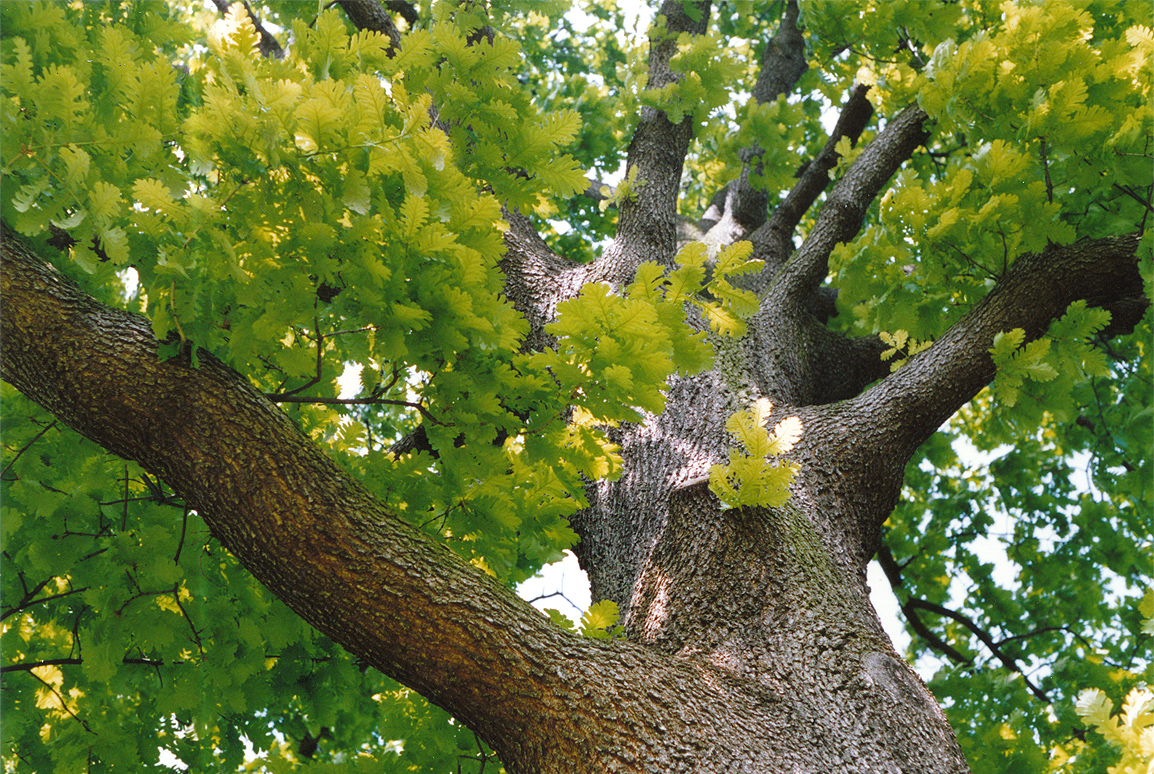
Mature specimen, Kew Gardens

== Distribution and habitat ==
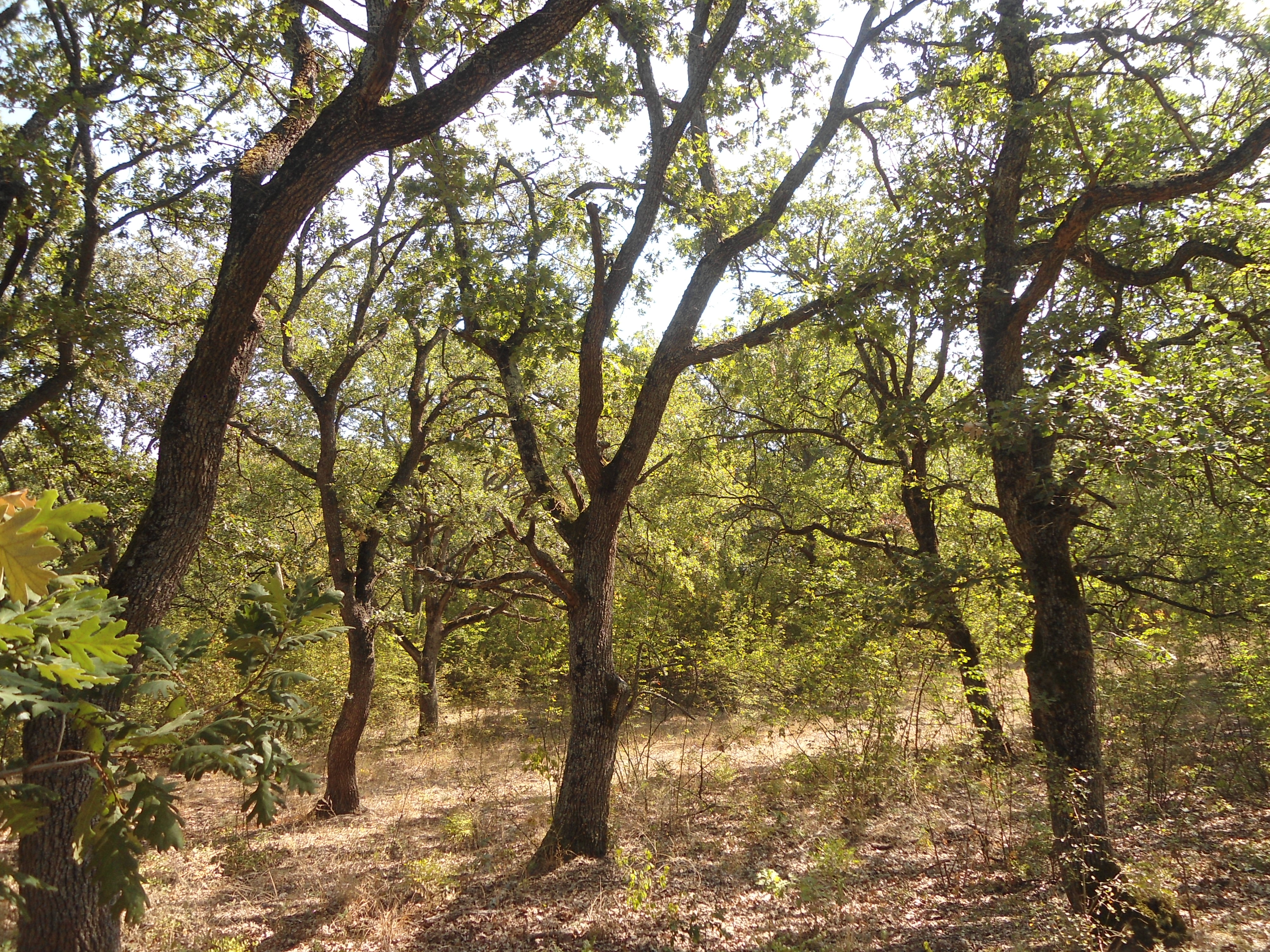
Hungarian oak forest

The centre of the tree's native range is in the Balkans. It is adapted to the subcontinental climate of southeastern Europe, but the main factor of its occurrence at a particular site is the soil. It is specially adapted to heavy acidic soils (cambisols and vertisols), typical of Kosovo, Serbia, Bulgaria and Romania. These soils are usually leached out, very dry in the summer and sometimes waterlogged in the spring. However, the Hungarian oak does not tolerate flooding or high water tables. It is also extremely sensitive to the presence of lime in the soil. Hence, in contradiction to its English vernacular name, which was assigned when the Kingdom of Hungary controlled large parts of the Balkans, the Hungarian oak is a very rare tree in modern Hungary, where the soils are generally very rich in lime. The Hungarian oak-Turkey oak forest (Quercetum frainetto-cerris Rud.) is the most widespread association of this oak in the Balkans, which is also the most common forest type in Serbia and Kosovo.

== Cultivation ==
This tree is cultivated in parks and large gardens, and the cultivar 'Hungarian Crown' has gained the Royal Horticultural Society's Award of Garden Merit.
