= Iberian conifer forests =

Mediterranean forests, woodlands and scrub ecoregion in southwestern Europe

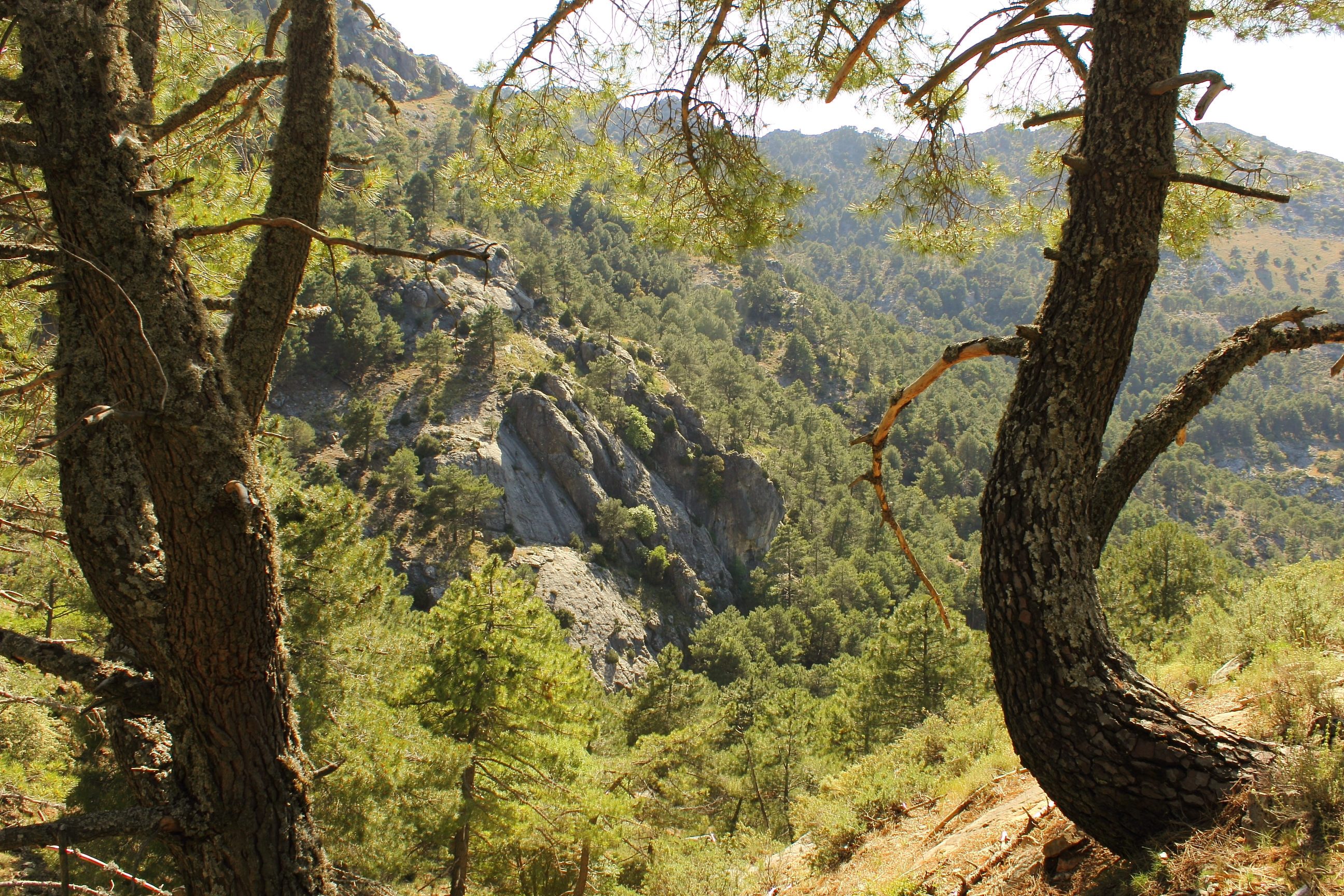
- Pines in the Sierra de Cazorla

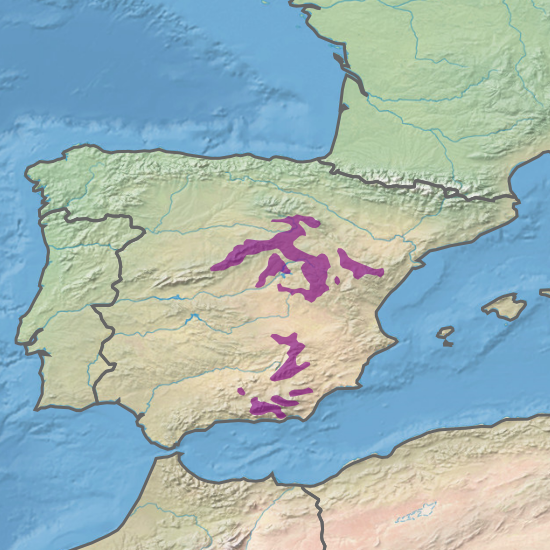
- Ecoregion territory (in purple)

Ecology
- Realm: Palearctic
- Biome: Mediterranean forests, woodlands, and scrub
- Borders: Iberian sclerophyllous and semi-deciduous forests; Northwest Iberian montane forests; Southeastern Iberian shrubs and woodlands

Geography
- Area: 34,462 km^{2} (13,306 mi^{2})
- Country: Spain
- Autonomous communities of Spain: Andalucia; Aragon; Castile and León; Castile-La Mancha; Madrid, Murcia

Conservation
- Conservation status: critical/endangered
- Protected: 15,229 km^{2} (44%)

The Iberian conifer forests is a Mediterranean forests, woodlands, and scrub ecoregion in southwestern Europe. It includes the mountain forests of southern and central Spain.

The ecoregion has montane Mediterranean climate. Rainfall averages 1,100 mm annually, and can exceed 1,500 mm in some high-elevation areas. Below-freezing temperatures and snow are common in the winter months.

== Geography ==
The ecoregion covers higher elevations in several disconnected ranges in southern and central Spain.

The southern ranges are mostly in Andalucia region and part of the Baetic System (Sistema Bético) of mountains. The Sierra Nevada is in southern Andalucia, north of the Mediterranean Sea. Mulhacén in the Sierra Nevada reaches 3478 metres elevation, and is the highest mountain in Europe outside the Alps and the Caucasus. The Sierra de Gádor is immediately to the southeast of the Sierra Nevada, and the Sierra de Baza (2,271 m) lies close to the northeast. The Sierra de Cazorla (2,107 m) is north of the Sierra Nevada. The Sierra de Castril lies northeast of the Sierra de Baza, at the boundary between Andalucia and Castilla-La Mancha regions.

The plateau of La Mancha separates the Baetic System from the Iberian System (Sistema Ibérico) of central Spain. The ecoregion covers the southern ranges of the Iberian System, including the Sierra de Gúdar (2,019 m) Sierra de Albarracín, and Sierra de Javalambre. It also includes the Sierra de Guadarrama (2,430 m), the eastern portion of the Sistema Central.

== Flora ==
Pine forests are the characteristic plant community, with Black pine (Pinus nigra salzmannii), Scots pine (Pinus sylvestris), Maritime pine (Pinus pinaster), stone pine (Pinus pinea), and Aleppo pine (Pinus halepensis) predominant. Spanish fir (Abies pinsapo) grows in the southern part of the ecoregion. Juniper woodlands dominated by Juniperus thurifera, Juniperus phoenicea and Juniperus oxycedrus grow on dry, rocky slopes.

Mixed forests of pines and broadleaf trees grow at middle to lower elevations in areas with deeper soils and higher humidity. Broadleaf trees include Quercus faginea, Quercus pyrenaica, Ulmus glabra, Fraxinus angustifolia, lindens (Tilia spp.), Sorbus spp., and maples (Acer granatense and Acer monspessulanum). Taxus baccata, Betula pubescens and Populus tremula grow in sheltered canyons with year-round moisture. Riparian trees also include willows (Salix atrocinerea, Salix purpurea, Salix caprea, and Salix eleagnos), Alnus glutinosa, and Populus nigra.

Heathlands dominated by Calluna vulgaris, Ulex and Juniperus communis grow in the northern part of the ecoregion.

Evergreen oaks, chiefly holm oak (Quercus rotundifolia), cork oak (Quercus suber) and kermes oak (Quercus coccifera) and maquis shrubland dominated by Olea europaea, Ceratonia siliqua, Laurus nobilis, Arbutus unedo, Rhamnus alaternus, Pistacia terebinthus, Pistacia lentiscus, Erica arborea, Erica scoparia, Phillyrea angustifolia, Phillyrea latifolia, Myrtus communis and Chamaerops humilis grow on dry and south-facing slopes at low and mid-elevations.

High-elevation plant communities in the Sierra Nevada include high-mountain wet grasslands, high mountain grasslands, and high-mountain shrubland. High-mountain wet grasslands grow on peat soils and around springs fed by snowmelt, and include many endemic species. High-mountain grasslands are dominated by grasses and rosette plants, including the endemic species Festuca clementei, Hormathophylla purpurea, Erigeron frigidus, Saxifraga nevadensis, Viola crassiuscula, and Linaria glacialis. High-mountain shrubland grows between 1,800 and 3,100 meters elevation, and is domninated by Juniperus communis and Genista versicolor, with Juniperus sabina, Cytisus oromediterraneus, Hormathophylla spinosa, Prunus prostrata, Astragalus nevadensis, Thymus serpylloides, Arenaria pungens, and Cerastium boissierianum.

The Sierra Nevada is one of the foremost plant biodiversity hotspots in the Western Mediterranean. 2100 species of vascular plants have been recorded in the Sierra Nevada, of which 80 are endemic, including about 40% of high-elevation species. Some species endemic to the Sierra Nevada and nearby Baetic mountains include Aquilegia nevadensis, Arenaria funiculata, Carex camposii, Centaurea bombycina, Centaurea granatensis, Delphinium nevadense, Galium erythrorrhizon, Globularia spinosa, Kernera boissieri, Lactuca singularis, Lavandula lanata, Linaria verticillata, Potentilla reuteri, Primula intricata subsp. lofthousei, Pterocephalus spathulatus, Salvia candelabrum, Saxifraga erioblasta, Saxifraga nevadensis, Senecio quinqueradiatus, and Vella spinosa. Gadoria falukei is endemic to the Sierra de Gádor.

The Baetic mountains share many plant species with the Rif mountains of northern Morocco, and many Baetic species' closest relatives are native to the Rif. These species, known as the Baetic-Rifan flora, constitute about 10% of the Sierra Nevada's plant diversity. Baetic-Rifan plants include Acer granatense, Adenocarpus decorticans, Arenaria pungens, Berberis vulgaris subsp. australis, Cotoneaster granatensis, Crocus nevadensis, Draba hispanica, Digitalis obscura, Erinacea anthyllis, Hormathophylla spinosa, Ionopsidium megalospermum, Lonicera arborea, Ranunculus granatensis, Stipa tenacissima, Thalictrum speciosissimum, and Valeriana nevadensis.

== Fauna ==
Spanish red deer (Cervus elaphus hispanicus) and roe deer (Capreolus capreolus) are widespread. The Western Spanish ibex (Capra pyrenaica victoriae), a threatened subspecies of goat, was reintroduced to Sierra de Guadarrama National Park in 1991 from the Gredos Mountains further west, and has increased in numbers since.

The Iberian wolf (Canis lupus signatus) lives in limited numbers in the northern ranges. An isolated southern population in the Sierra Morena of western Andalucia dwindled in numbers and interbred with dogs, and may now be extinct.

The ecoregion is home to over 150 species of birds, including the Spanish imperial eagle (Aquila adalberti) and golden eagle (Aquila chrysaetos).

The Betic midwife toad (Alytes dickhilleni), and Sierra Nevada lizard (Timon nevadensis) are endemic to the Baetic mountains.

== Protected areas ==
952 km^{2}, or 35%, of the ecoregion is in protected areas.

Protected areas include Sierra Nevada National Park, Sierra de Baza Natural Park, Sierra de Castril Natural Park, Serrania de Cuenca Natural Park, Sierras de Cazorla, Segura y Las Villas Natural Park, Sierra de Guadarrama National Park, Sierra de Huétor Natural Park, Moncayo Natural Park, Lagunas de Ruidera Natural Park, Los Calares del Mundo y de la Sima Natural Park, Barranco del Rio Dulce Natural Park, Alto Tajo Natural Park, Sierra Norte de Guadalajara Natural Park, and Sierra Norte de Guadarrama Natural Park.
