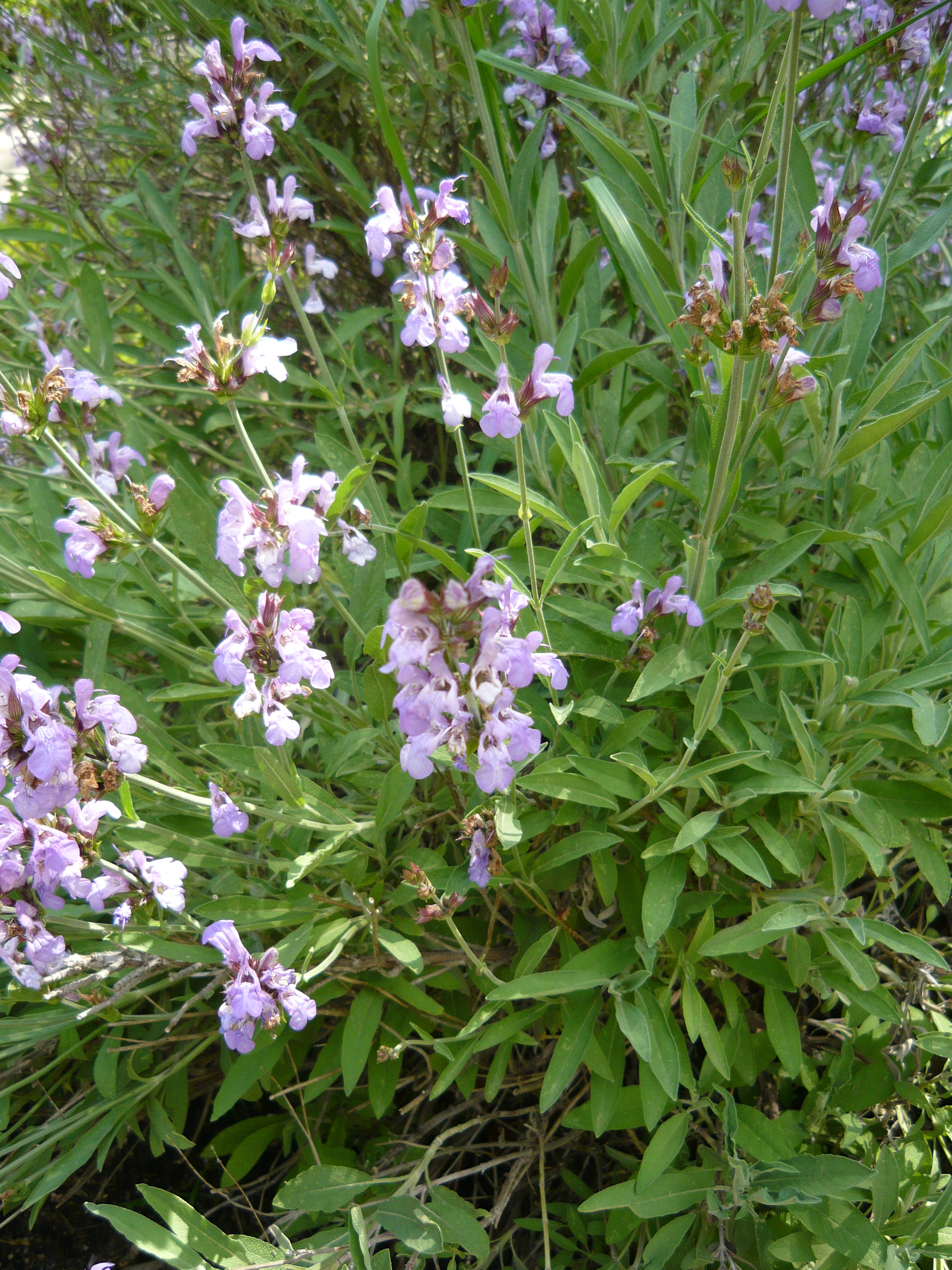

Scientific classification
- Kingdom: Plantae
- Clade: Tracheophytes
- Clade: Angiosperms
- Clade: Eudicots
- Clade: Asterids
- Order: Lamiales
- Family: Lamiaceae
- Genus: Salvia
- Species: S. officinalis
- Subspecies: S. o. subsp. lavandulifolia

Trinomial name
- Salvia officinalis subsp. lavandulifolia (Vahl) Gams

Synonyms
- Salvia lavandulaefolia, orth. var.; Salvia lavandulifolia

= Salvia officinalis subsp. lavandulifolia =

Species of shrub

Salvia officinalis subsp. lavandulifolia, synonym Salvia lavandulifolia, (Spanish sage) is a small woody herbaceous perennial native to Spain and southern France, growing in rocky soil in Maquis shrubland, often found growing with rosemary, Lavandula lanata, and Genista cinerea.

S. officinalis subsp. lavandulifolia grows 30 centimetres (1 ft) tall and wide, with a reclining habit and narrow, lanceolate, whitish-gray evergreen leaves that are less than 50 mm (2 in) long. The leaves grow opposite each other on the stem and appear to grow in bunches. When the leaves are rubbed, oils give off a fragrance similar to rosemary. These oils are used for scenting soaps. The 25 mm (1 in) long, pale lavender flowers grow on short inflorescences, blooming for about one month in late spring and early summer. The flowering stems have very few flowers on widely spaced whorls. Some varieties have a dark calyx.

== Biochemistry ==
The essential oil of S. officinalis subsp. lavandulifolia has been found to have a selective acetylcholinesterase-inhibiting effect, (in as far as the regions of the brain in which acetylcholinesterase activity has been demonstrated, such areas are striatum and hippocampus) with an IC_{50} value of 0.03 μg/ml. The chief reason for this activity are believed to be the monoterpenes 1,8-cineole and α-pinene which have IC_{50} values of 0.67 and 0.63 mM, respectively.

== Medical effects ==
A 2003 study indicated that S. officinalis subsp. lavandulifolia improves word recall in healthy young adults.
