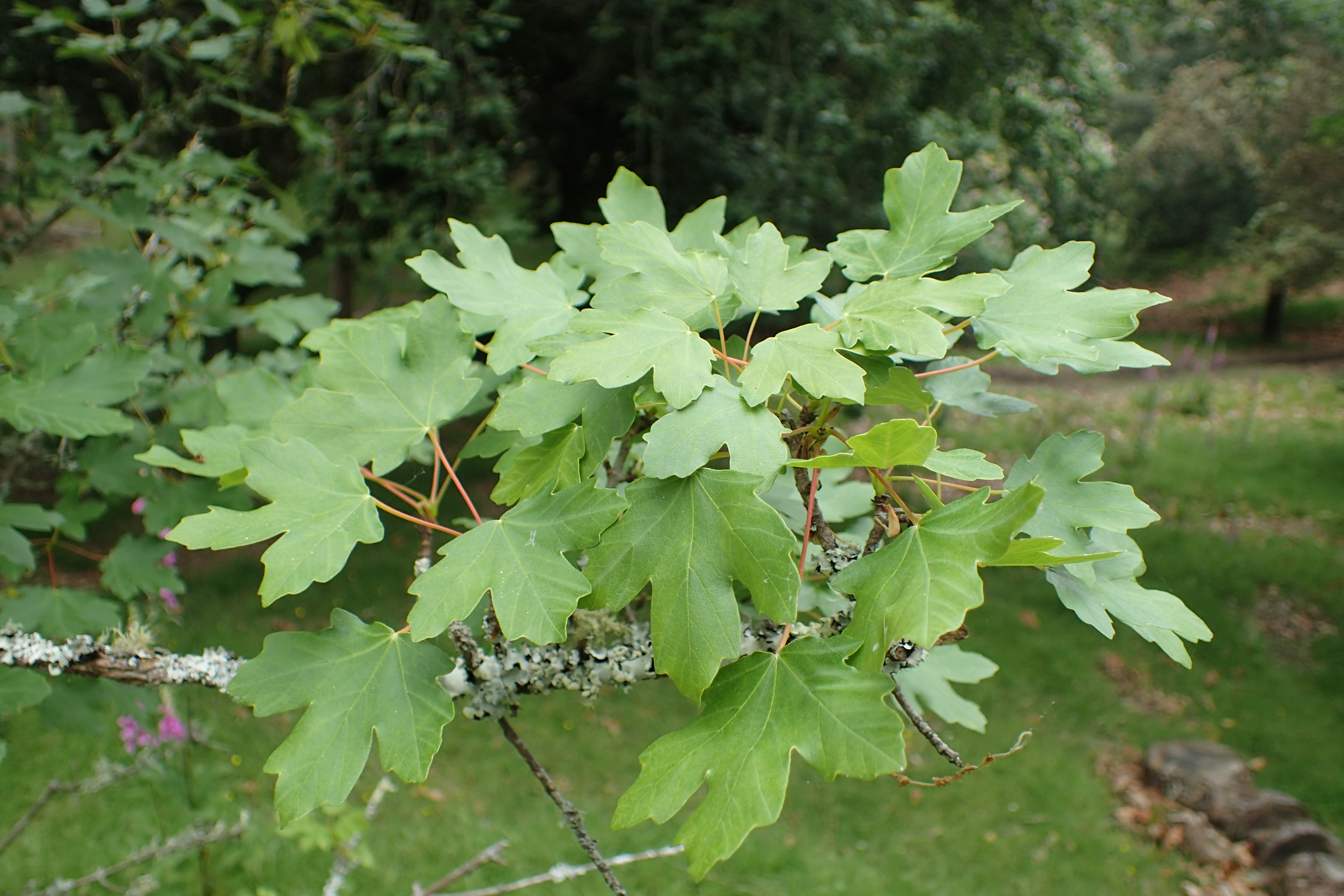

Conservation status
- Least Concern (IUCN 3.1)

Scientific classification
- Kingdom: Plantae
- Clade: Embryophytes
- Clade: Tracheophytes
- Clade: Spermatophytes
- Clade: Angiosperms
- Clade: Eudicots
- Clade: Rosids
- Order: Sapindales
- Family: Sapindaceae
- Genus: Acer
- Section: Acer sect. Acer
- Series: Acer ser. Monspessulana
- Species: A. granatense

Binomial name
- Acer granatense Boiss.
- Distribution

Synonyms
- Acer granatense subsp. xauense (Pau & Font Quer) Dobignard

= Acer granatense =

Species of flowering plant

Acer granatense, or the Spanish maple, is a species of flowering plant in the genus Acer, native to southern and eastern Spain, including Mallorca in the Balearic Islands and the Rif mountains of Morocco. Considered by some authorities to be a subspecies of the Italian maple, Acer opalus subsp. granatense, it is often found growing on cliffs and crevices in mountainous areas. It grows from 190 to 2,000 meters (620 to 6,560 ft) elevation, often on north-facing slopes where it is sheltered from the effects of the Mediterranean climate summer droughts. It is often associated with Abies pinsapo, Quercus spp., Berberis vulgaris subsp. australis, Crataegus laciniata, and Juniperus oxycedrus.
