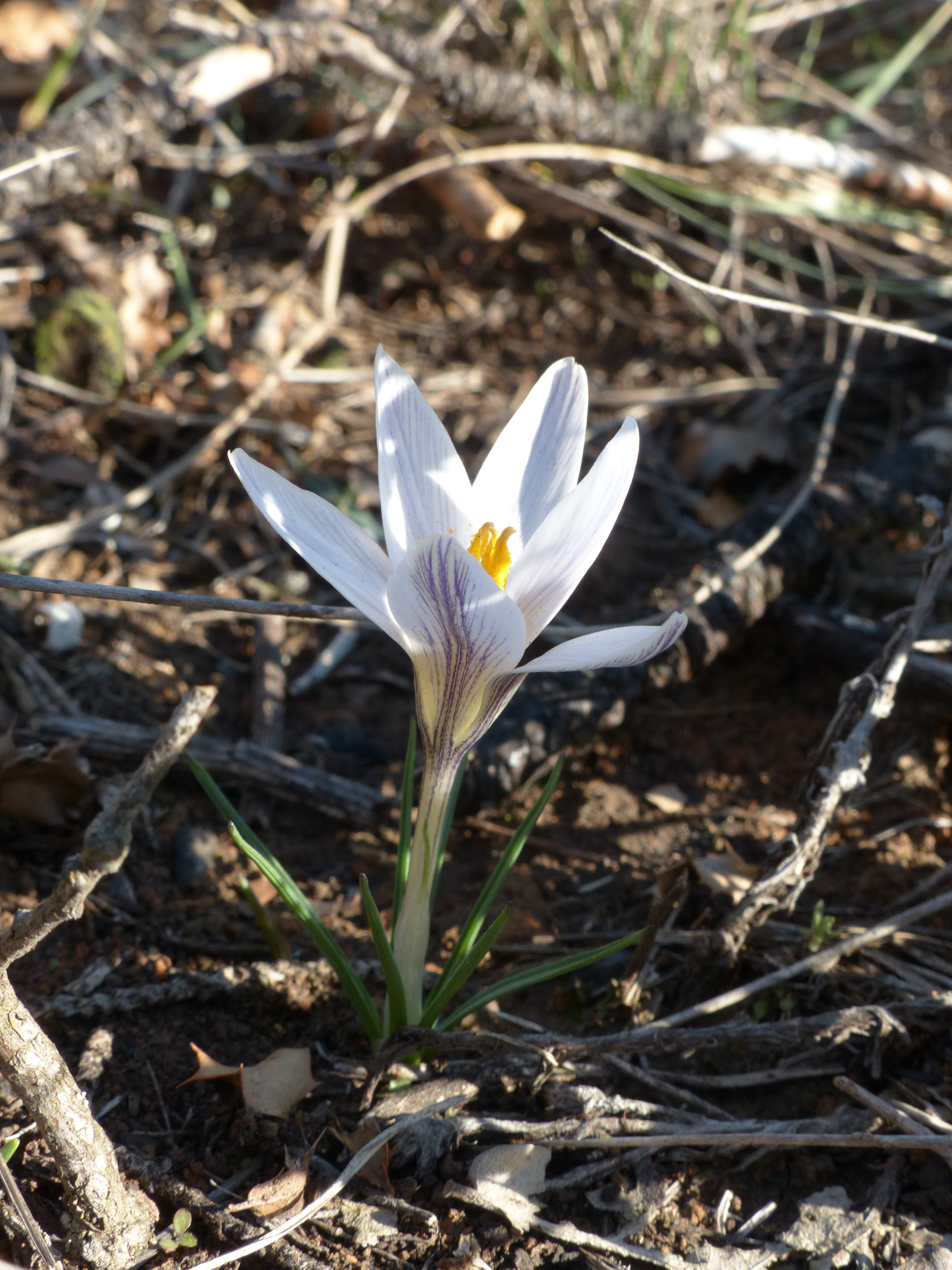

Scientific classification
- Kingdom: Plantae
- Clade: Tracheophytes
- Clade: Angiosperms
- Clade: Monocots
- Order: Asparagales
- Family: Iridaceae
- Genus: Crocus
- Species: C. nevadensis

Binomial name
- Crocus nevadensis Amo & Campo

= Crocus nevadensis =

Species of flowering plant

Crocus nevadensis is a species of Crocus from North Africa and Spain.

It is found growing in mountain meadows, scree, scrub, and open pine forests at elevations that range from 1000 to 3000 meters; flowers occur in February to April.

Plants have fimbriate, white stigmas, and the petals are sometime not marked - especially for plants found around the Sierra de Cazorla region.

Under cultivation the plants are very susceptible to infections by botrytis, which attacks the faded flowers and can move into the corm and kill it.
