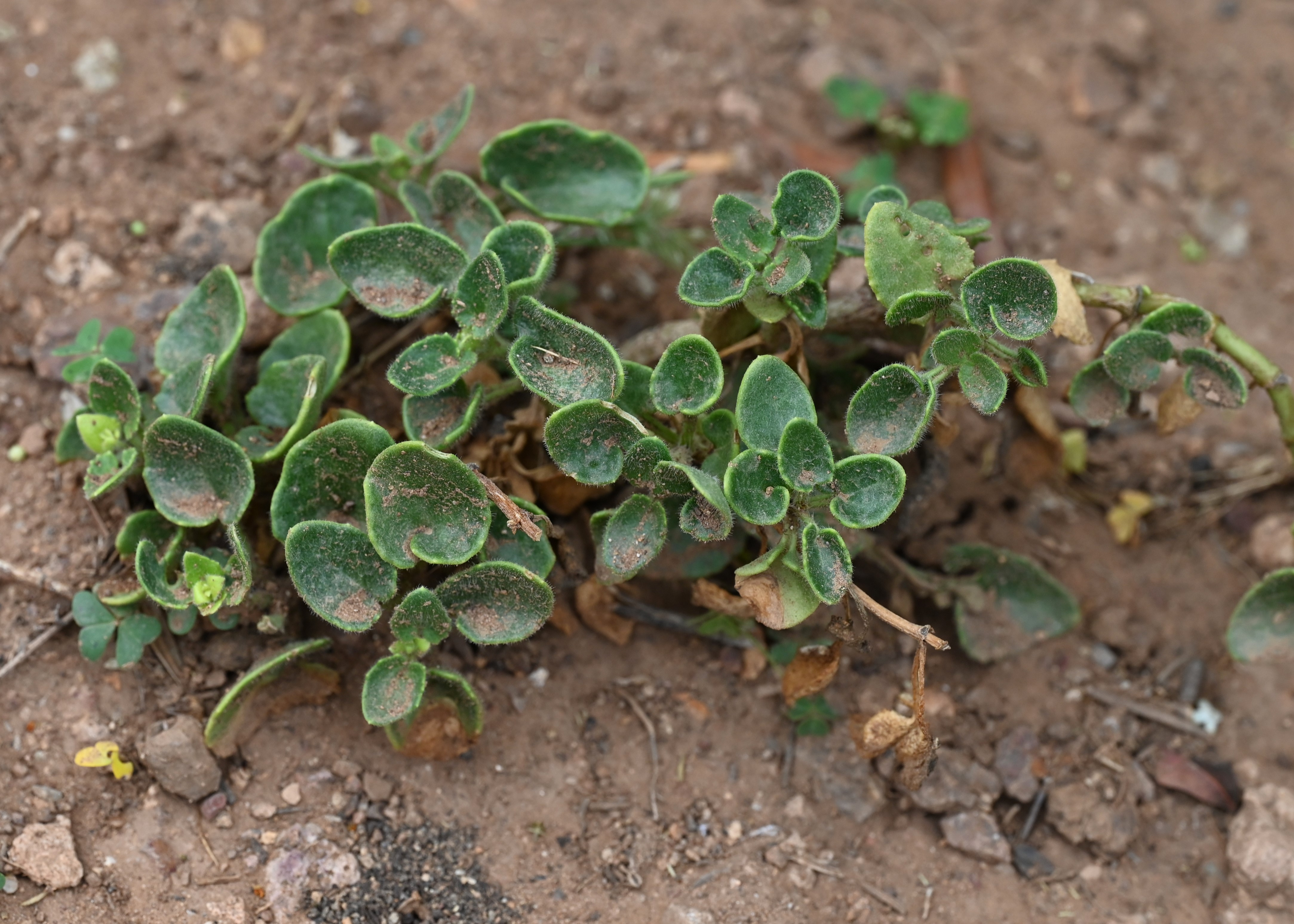

Scientific classification
- Kingdom: Plantae
- Clade: Tracheophytes
- Clade: Angiosperms
- Clade: Eudicots
- Clade: Asterids
- Order: Lamiales
- Family: Plantaginaceae
- Tribe: Antirrhineae
- Genus: Gadoria; Güemes & Mota (2017)
- Species: G. falukei

Binomial name
- Gadoria falukei Güemes & Mota (2017)

= Gadoria =

Genus of flowering plants

Gadoria falukei is a species of flowering plant in the family Plantaginaceae. It is the sole species in genus Gadoria. It is a subshrub native to the Sierra de Gádor in southeastern Spain.
