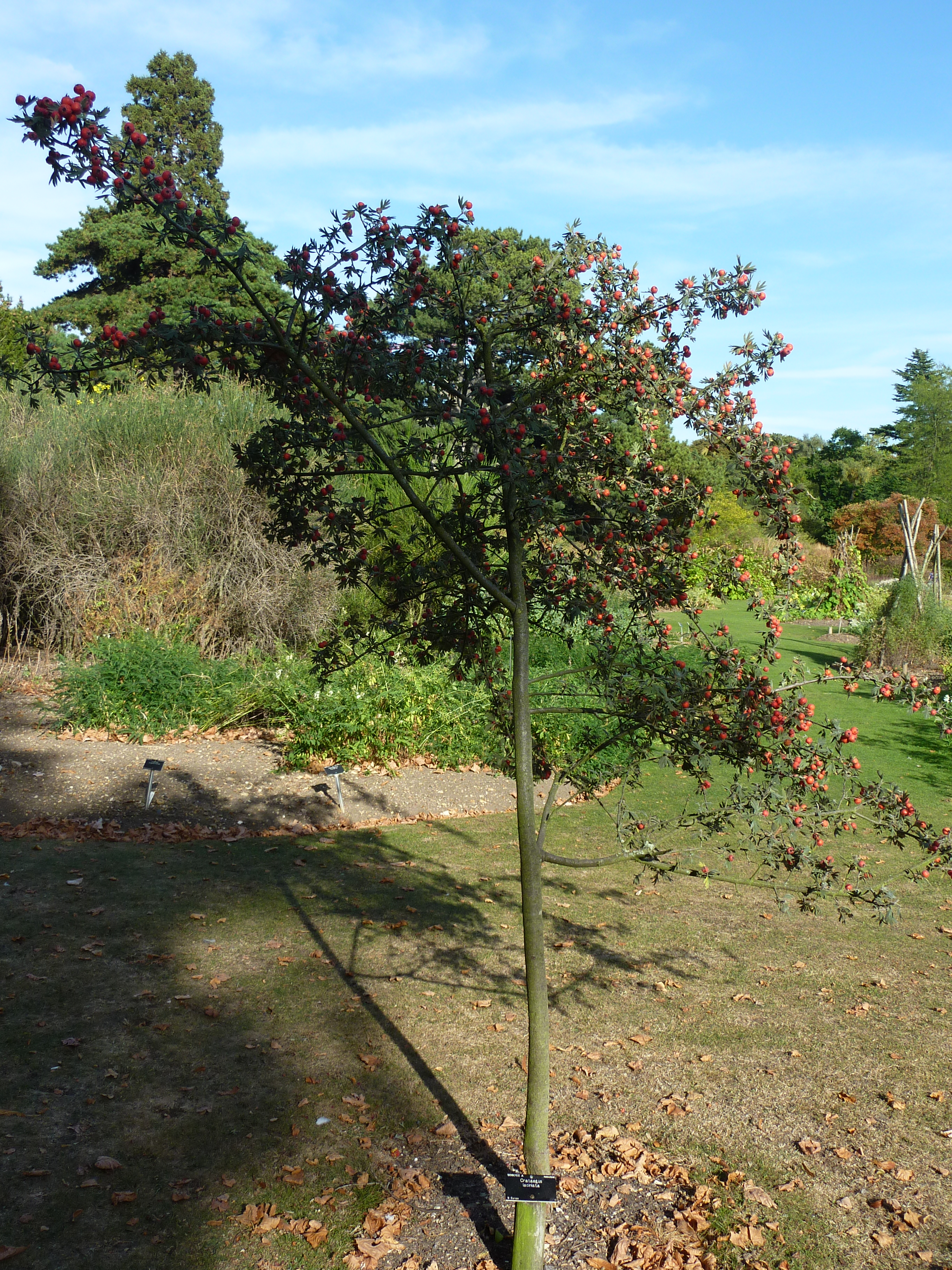
- At the Cambridge University Botanic Garden

Conservation status
- Least Concern (IUCN 3.1)

Scientific classification
- Kingdom: Plantae
- Clade: Tracheophytes
- Clade: Angiosperms
- Clade: Eudicots
- Clade: Rosids
- Order: Rosales
- Family: Rosaceae
- Subtribe: Malinae
- Genus: Crataegus
- Species: C. laciniata

Binomial name
- Crataegus laciniata Ucria

Synonyms
- List: Azarolus pubescens (C.Presl) M.Roem.; Crataegus alutacea Klokov; Crataegus eriocarpa Pomel; Crataegus orientalis subsp. presliana K.I.Chr.; Crataegus panachaica C.K.Schneid.; Crataegus popovii Chrshan.; Crataegus pubescens C.Presl; Mespilus laciniata (Ucria) Guss.; Oxyacantha sicula M.Roem.

= Crataegus laciniata =

Species of flowering plant

Crataegus laciniata is a species of hawthorn found in Morocco, Algeria, Spain and Sicily.

== Authorship issues ==
Over the years a number of author's names (auct. mult.) have become associated with the name Crataegus laciniata. Some may be erroneous, and some may have been synonymized:

- Crataegus laciniata Besser
- Crataegus laciniata Borkh.
- Crataegus laciniata Kar. & Kir.
- Crataegus laciniata Montrouz.
- Crataegus laciniata Stev.
- Crataegus laciniata Steven ex Besser
- Crataegus laciniata Willk.
