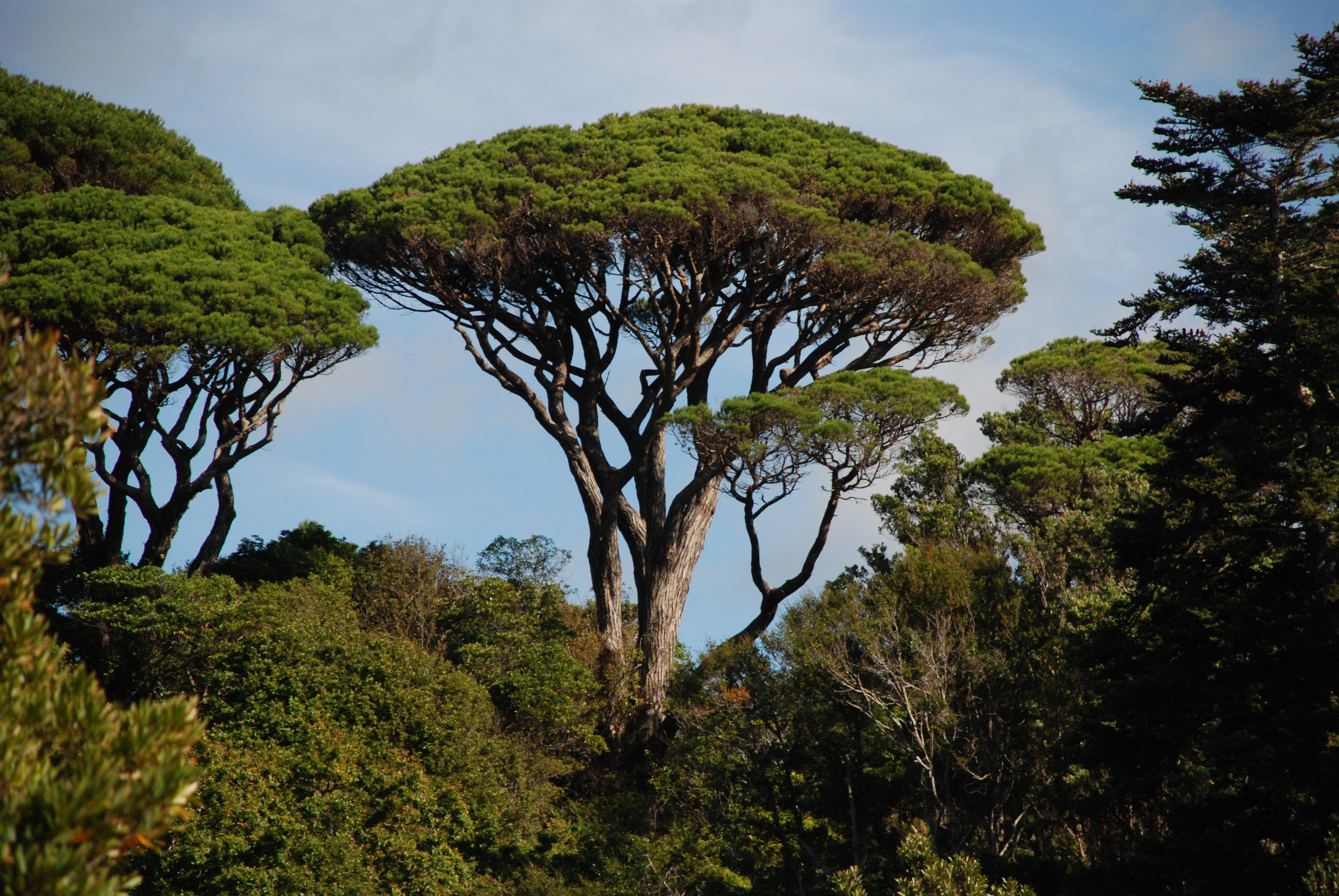

Conservation status
- Least Concern (IUCN 3.1)

Scientific classification
- Kingdom: Plantae
- Clade: Tracheophytes
- Clade: Gymnosperms
- Division: Pinophyta
- Class: Pinopsida
- Order: Pinales
- Family: Pinaceae
- Genus: Pinus
- Subgenus: P. subg. Pinus
- Section: P. sect. Pinus
- Subsection: Pinus subsect. Pinaster
- Species: P. pinea

Binomial name
- Pinus pinea L.
- Distribution map

= Pinus pinea =

Species of pine tree

Pinus pinea, the Italian stone pine or Mediterranean stone pine, is a species of conifer in the family Pinaceae. The tree is a pine native to the Mediterranean region, occurring in Southern Europe and the Levant. The species was introduced into North Africa millennia ago, and is also naturalized in the Canary Islands, South Africa and New South Wales.

Stone pines have been used and cultivated for their edible pine nuts since prehistoric times. They are widespread in horticultural cultivation as ornamental trees, planted in gardens and parks around the world. This plant has gained the Royal Horticultural Society's Award of Garden Merit.

== Description ==
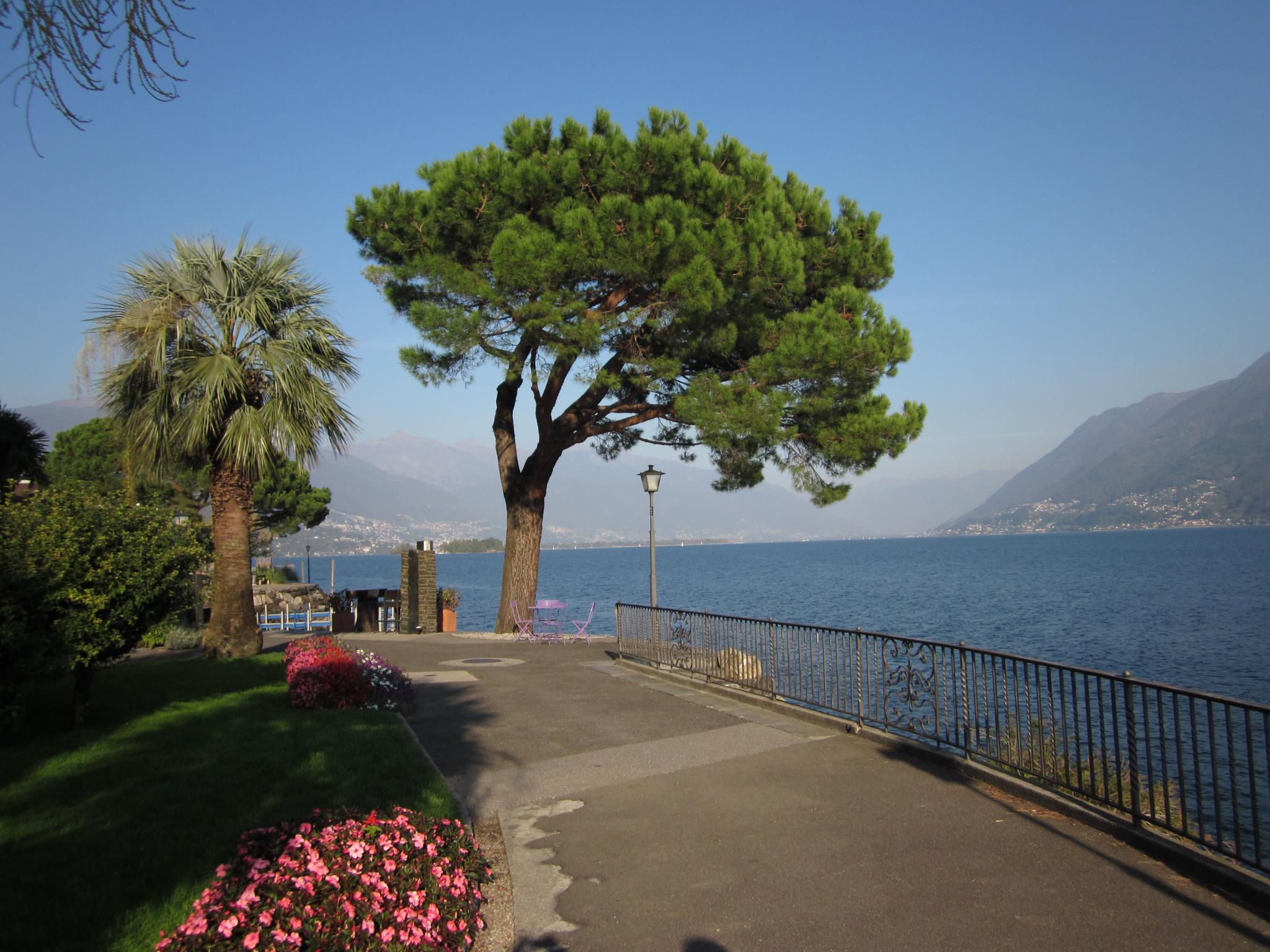
Stone pine in Brissago, on Lake Maggiore, Switzerland

The stone pine is a coniferous tree that can exceed 25 metres (80 feet) in height, but 12–20 m (40–65 ft) is more typical. In youth, it is a bushy globe, in mid-age an umbrella canopy on a thick trunk, and, in maturity, a broad and flat crown over 8 m (26 ft) in width. The bark is thick, red-brown and deeply fissured into broad vertical plates.

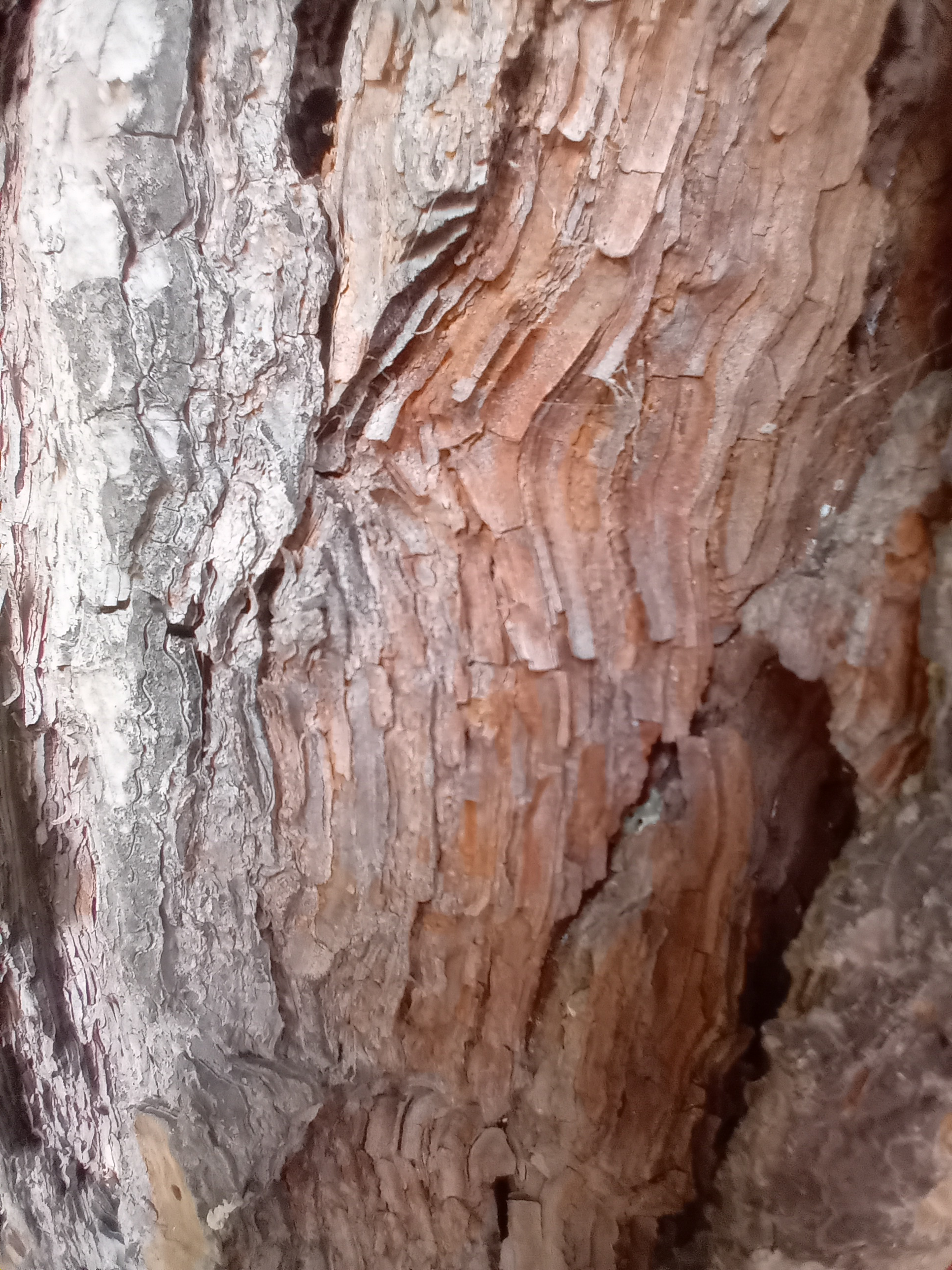
Bark of a stone pine, Pisa

Foliage

The flexible mid-green leaves are needle-like, in bundles of two, and are 10–20 cm (4–8 in) long (exceptionally up to 30 cm or 12 in). Young trees up to 5–10 years old bear juvenile leaves, which are very different, single (not paired), 2–4 cm (3/4–1 1/2 in) long, glaucous blue-green; the adult leaves appear mixed with juvenile leaves from the fourth or fifth year on, replacing it fully by around the tenth year. Juvenile leaves are also produced in regrowth following injury, such as a broken shoot, on older trees.

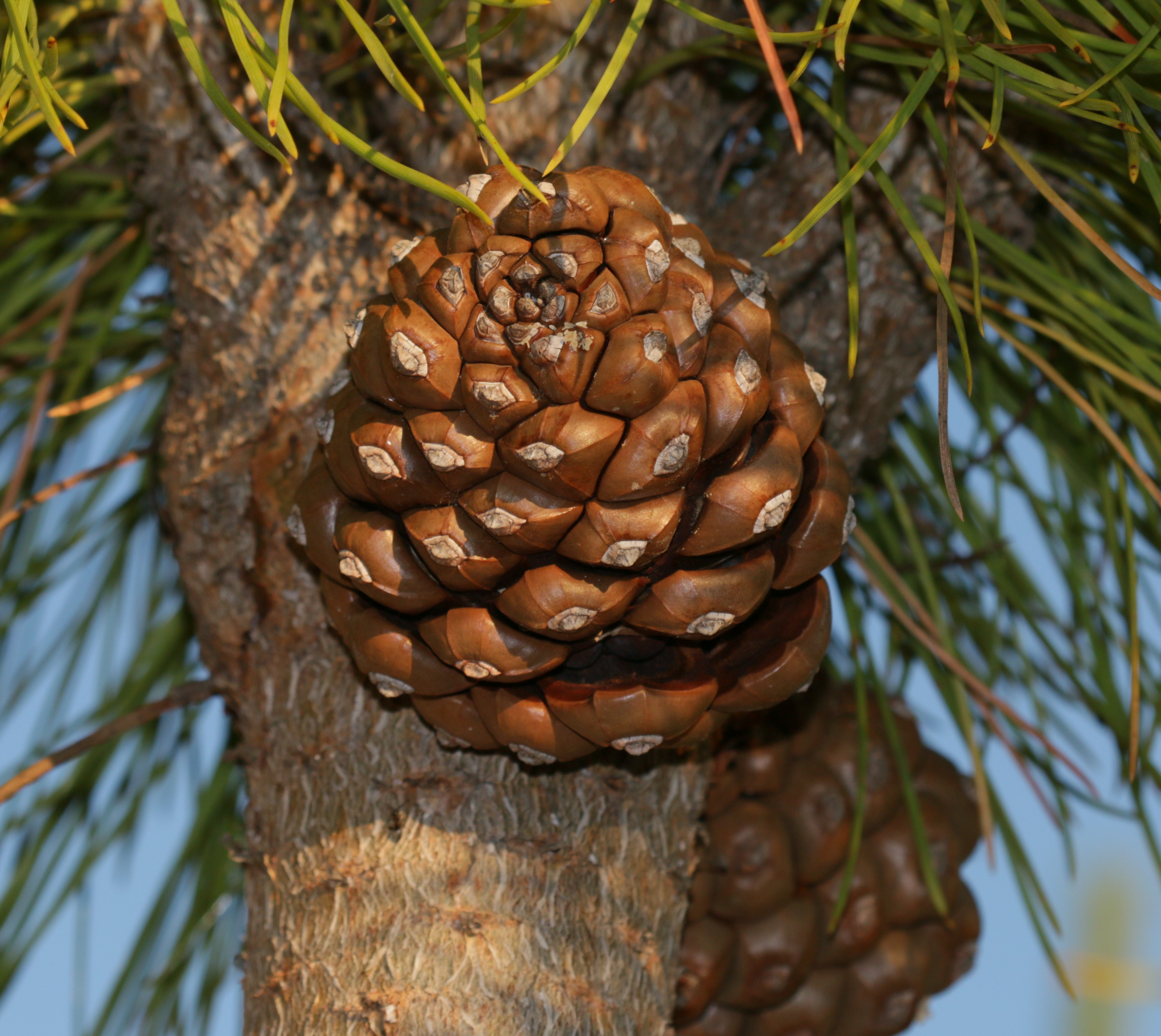
Cone

The cones are broad, ovoid, 8–15 cm (3–6 in) long, and take 36 months to mature, longer than any other pine. The seeds (pine nuts, piñones, pinhões, pinoli, or pignons) are large, 2 cm (3/4 in) long, and pale brown with a powdery black coating that rubs off easily, and have a rudimentary 4–8 mm (5/32–5/16 in) wing that falls off very easily. The wing is ineffective for wind dispersal, and the seeds are animal-dispersed, originally mainly by the Iberian magpie, but in recent history largely by humans.

== Distribution and habitat ==
Pinus pinea is a characteristic, yet controversial, species throughout the Mediterranean basin. Its definitive native range is highly debated. Strong evidence suggests its origin is in the Western Mediterranean, particularly the Iberian Peninsula (Portugal and Spain), where the most extensive natural stands are found, and where it reaches its highest altitudes. The presence of Paleolithic and Pleistocene sites containing the remains of Pinus pinea on the South Iberian Peninsula provides strong evidence that the species was once part of the natural forest ecosystem in that region. Furthermore, the presence of pollen dating between 18-22 thousand years ago (end of Pleistocene) in Southern France supports the hypothesis of its native status there.

Conversely, other opinions suggest a native presence extending to the Central and Eastern Mediterranean, specifically regions of Italy (Tuscany, Sardinia, Sicily), the Peloponnese (Greece), the coasts of Asia Minor (Turkey), and Lebanon.

The species has been intensively cultivated for its valuable edible nuts and wood since at least the 4th century B.C. and earlier. This long history of human intervention means that while it is found today across coastal areas from Portugal to Lebanon and the Black Sea, it is often impossible to distinguish between truly native stands and those that are now naturalized from ancient artificial plantings.

The prehistoric range of Pinus pinea included North Africa in the Sahara Desert and Maghreb regions during a more humid climate period, in present-day Morocco, Algeria, Tunisia, and Libya.

=== Ecoregions ===
Its contemporary range is within the Mediterranean forests, woodlands, and scrub biome, which includes the following areas:

Southern Europe

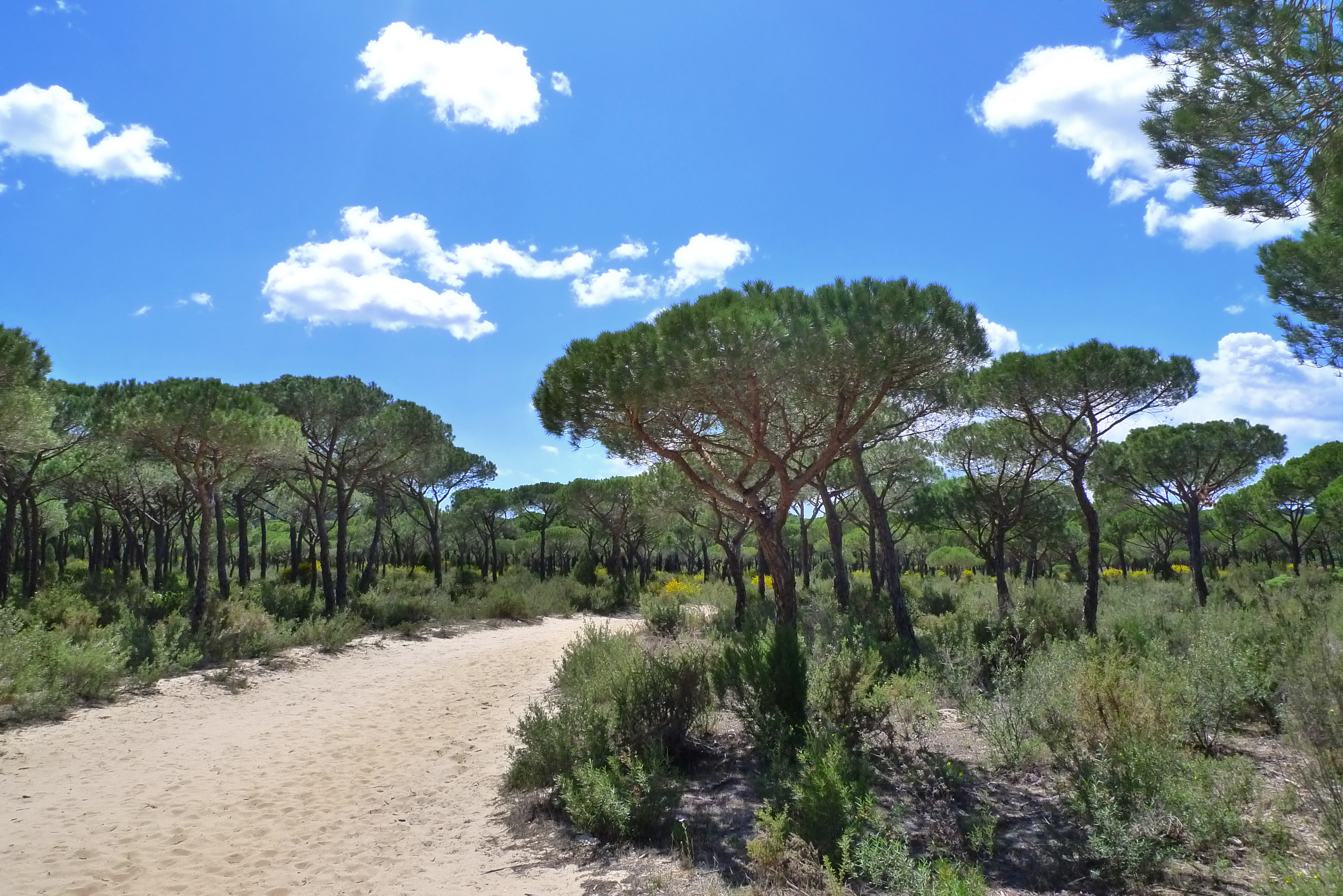
Pinus pinea, Doñana National Park (Andalusia, Spain)

The Iberian conifer forests ecoregion of the Iberian Peninsula in Spain and Portugal; the Italian sclerophyllous and semi-deciduous forests ecoregion in France and Italy; the Tyrrhenian-Adriatic sclerophyllous and mixed forests ecoregion of southern Italy, Sicily, and Sardinia; the Illyrian deciduous forests of the eastern coast of the Ionian and Adriatic Seas in Albania and Croatia; the Crimean Submediterranean forest complex ecoregion on Krasnodar Krai (Russia) and the Crimea Peninsula; and the Aegean and Western Turkey sclerophyllous and mixed forests ecoregion of the southern Balkan Peninsula in Greece. In many parts of northern Italy, large parks with pine trees were laid out by the sea. Examples are the Pineta of Jesolo and Barcola, the Urban Beach of Trieste.

In Greece, although the species is not widely distributed, an extensive stone pine forest exists in western Peloponnese at Strofylia on the peninsula separating the Kalogria Lagoon from the Mediterranean Sea. This coastal forest is at least 13 kilometres (8 miles) long, with dense and tall stands of Pinus pinea mixed with Pinus halepensis. Currently, P. halepensis is outcompeting stone pines in many locations of the forest. Another location in Greece is at Koukounaries on the northern Aegean island of Skiathos at the southwest corner of the island. This is a half-mile-long dense stand of stone and Aleppo pines that lies between a lagoon and the Aegean Sea.

Western Asia

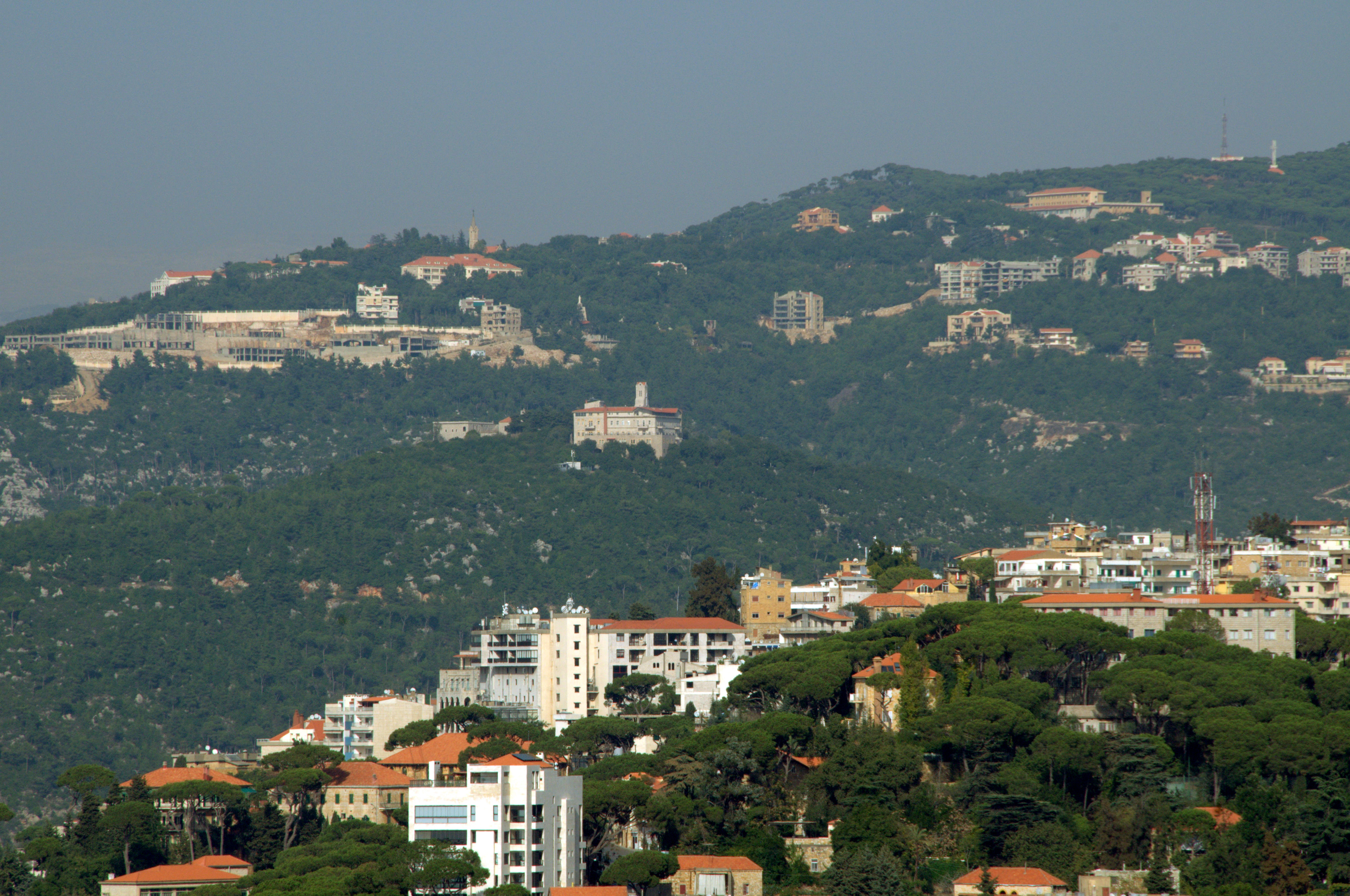
Stone pine forests in Brummana, Lebanon

In Western Asia, the Eastern Mediterranean conifer-sclerophyllous-broadleaf forests ecoregion in Turkey; and the Southern Anatolian montane conifer and deciduous forests ecoregion in Turkey, Syria, Lebanon, Israel and in the Palestinian Territories.

Northern Africa

The Mediterranean woodlands and forests ecoregion of North Africa, in Tunisia, Morocco and Algeria.

South Africa

In the Western Cape Province, the pines were according to legend planted by the French Huguenot refugees who settled at the Cape of Good Hope during the late 17th century and who brought the seeds with them from France. The tree is known in the Afrikaans language as kroonden.

== Ecology ==
Pinus pinea is a diagnostic species of the vegetation class Pinetea halepensis.

=== Pests ===
The introduced Western conifer seed bug (Leptoglossus occidentalis) was accidentally imported with timber to northern Italy in the late 1990s from the western US, and has spread across Europe as an invasive pest species since then. It feeds on the sap of developing conifer cones throughout its life, and its sap-sucking causes the developing seeds to wither and misdevelop. It has destroyed most of the pine nut seeds in Italy, threatening P. pinea in its native habitats there.

Pestalotiopsis pini (a genus of ascomycete fungi), was found as an emerging pathogen on Pinus pinea in Portugal. Evidence of shoot blight and stem necrosis were found in stone pine orchards and urban areas in 2020. The edible pine nut production has been decreasing in the affected area due to several factors, including pests and diseases. The fungus was found on needles, shoots and trunks of P. pinea and also on P. pinaster. Pestalotiopsis fungal species could represent a threat to the health of pine forests in the Mediterranean basin.

== Uses ==
=== Food ===
Pinus pinea has been cultivated extensively for at least 6,000 years for its edible pine nuts, which have been trade items since early historic times. The tree has been cultivated throughout the Mediterranean region for so long that it has naturalized, and is often considered native beyond its natural range.

=== Ornamental ===
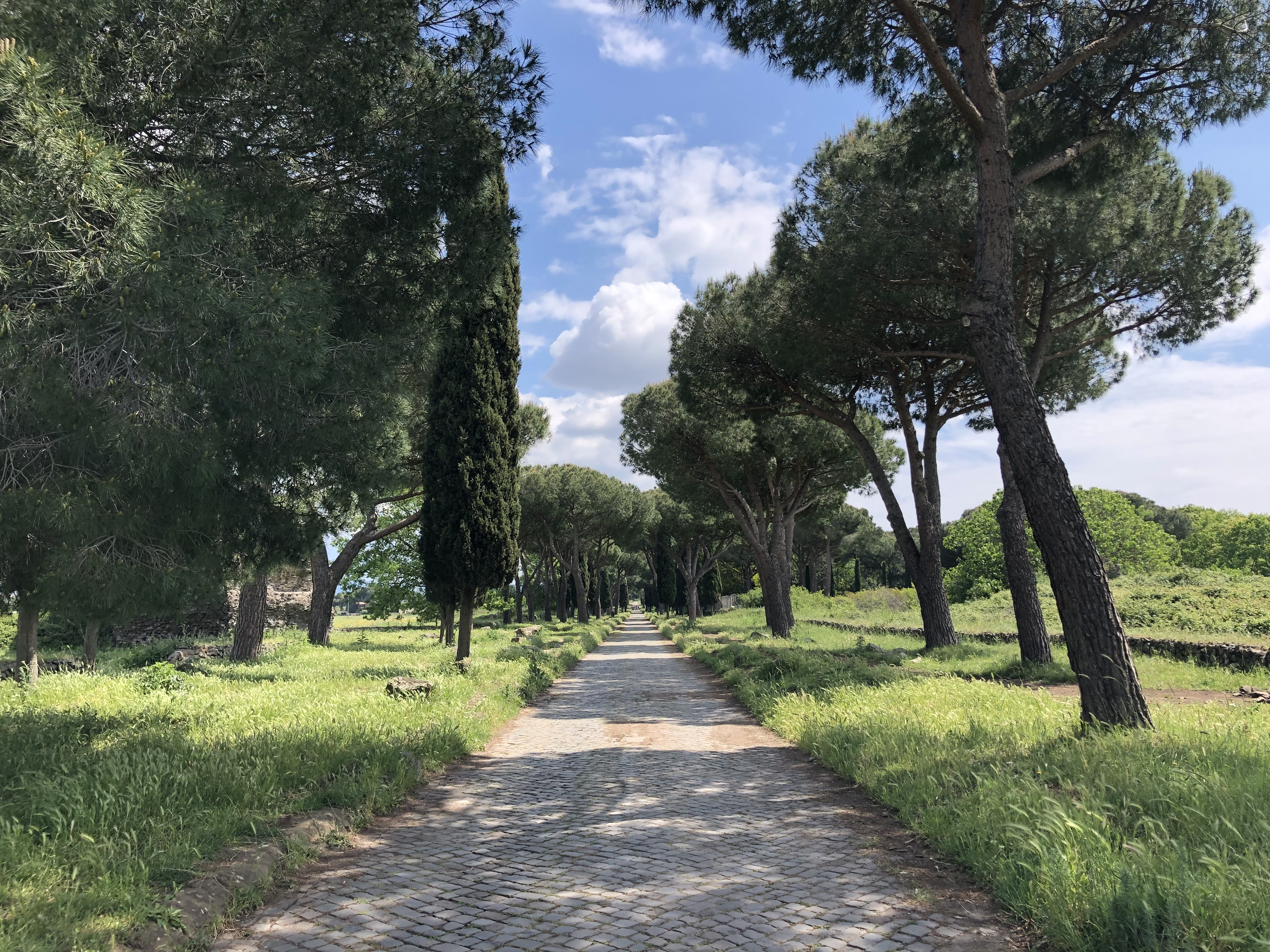
Pines on Via Appia Antica

The tree is among the current symbols of Rome. It was first planted in Rome during the Roman Republic, where many historic Roman roads, such as the Via Appia, were (and still are) embellished with lines of stone pines. Stone pines were planted on the hills of the Bosphorus strait in Istanbul for ornamental purposes during the Ottoman period. In Italy, the stone pine has been an aesthetic landscape element since the Italian Renaissance garden period. In the 1700s, P. pinea began being introduced as an ornamental tree to other Mediterranean climate regions of the world, and is now often found in gardens and parks in South Africa, California, and Australia. It has naturalized beyond cities in South Africa to the extent that it is listed as an invasive species there. It is also planted in western Europe up to southern Scotland, and on the East Coast of the United States up to New Jersey.

In the United Kingdom it has won the Royal Horticultural Society's Award of Garden Merit.

Small specimens are used for bonsai, and also grown in large pots and planters. The year-old seedlings are seasonally available as table-top Christmas trees 20–30 cm (8–12 in) tall.

=== Other ===
Other products of economic value include resin, bark for tannin extraction, and empty pine cone shells for fuel. Pinus pinea is also currently widely cultivated around the Mediterranean for environmental protection such as consolidation of coastal dunes, soil conservation and protection of coastal agricultural crops.

== Gallery ==
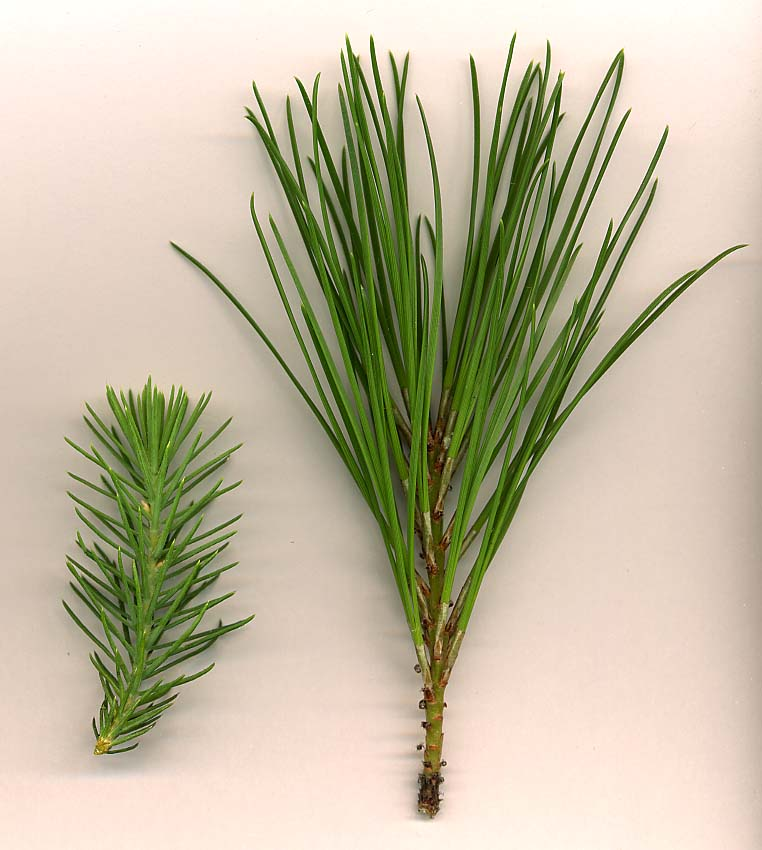
Needles of a juvenile (left) and adult (right)

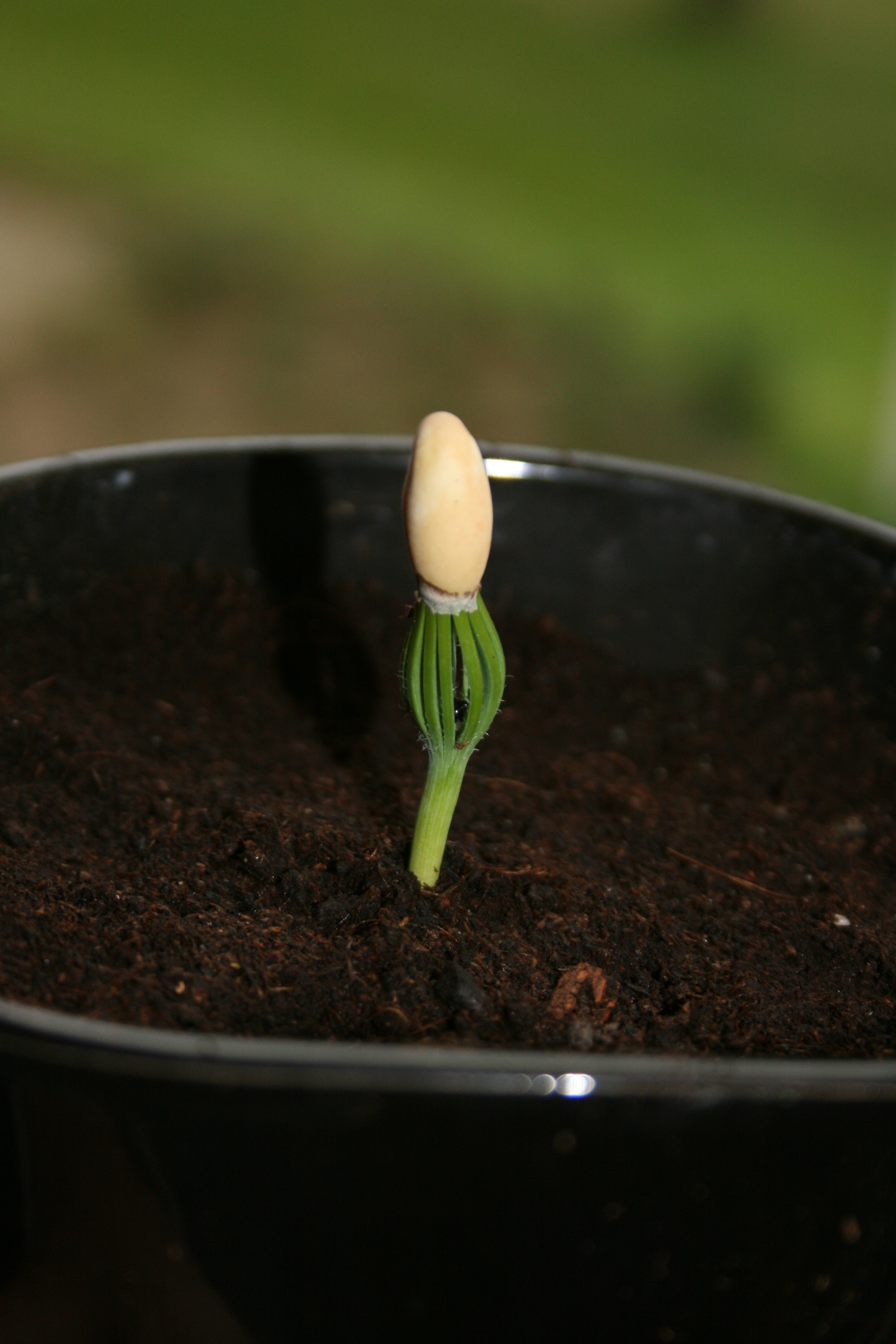
Seedling

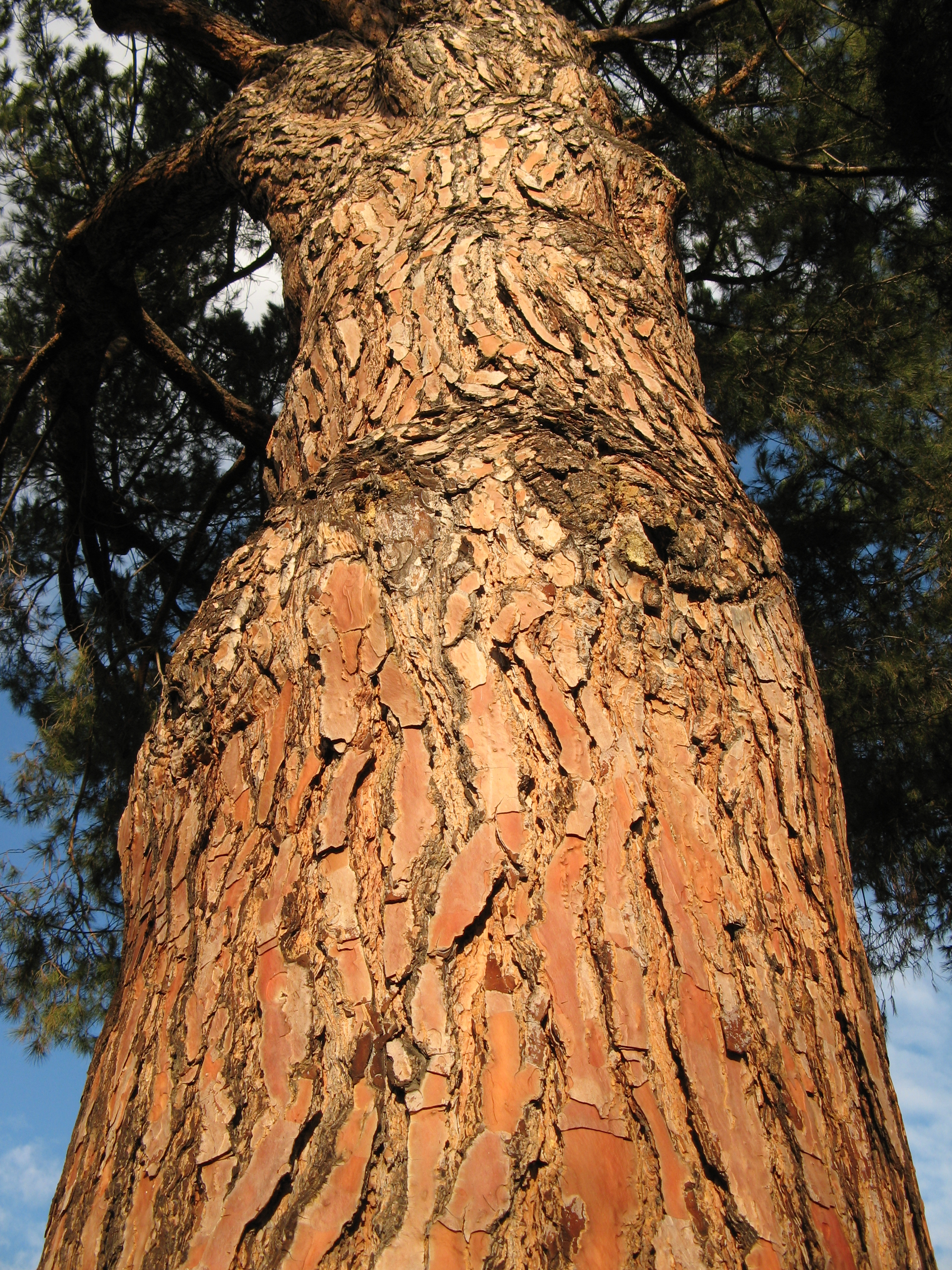
Close-up of the bark's vertical texture

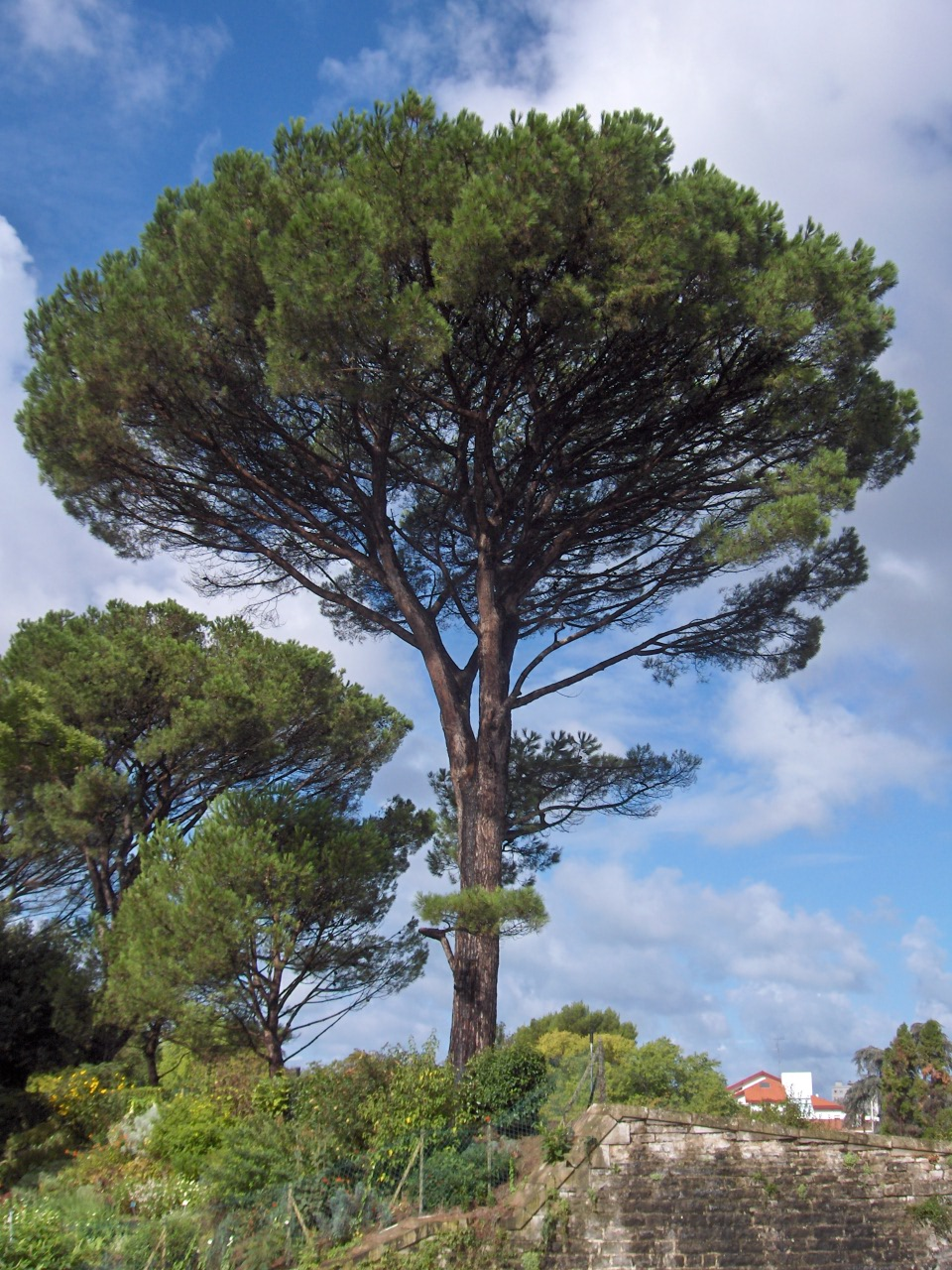
Trunk and crown of mature tree

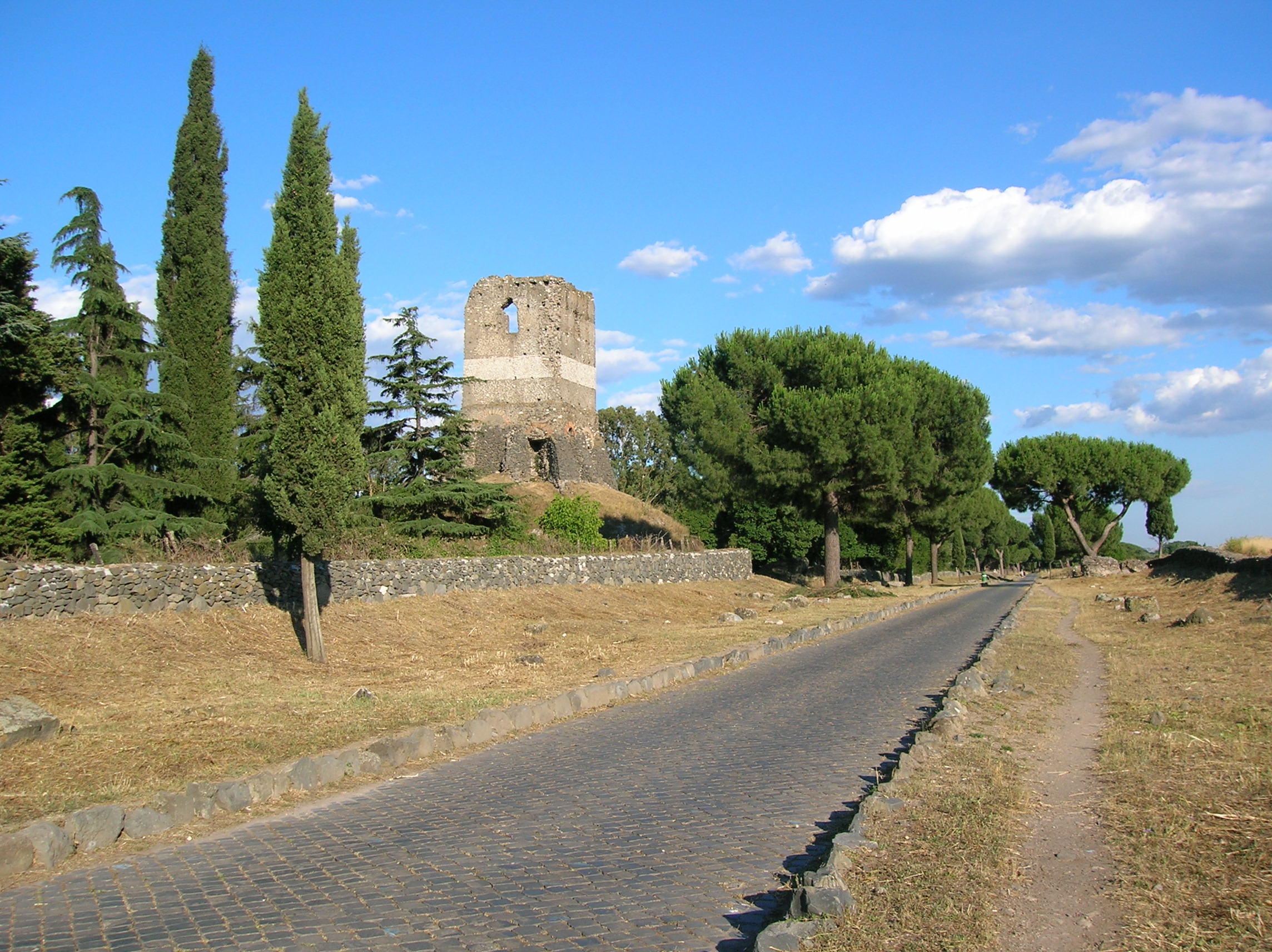
Pines on Via Appia Antica

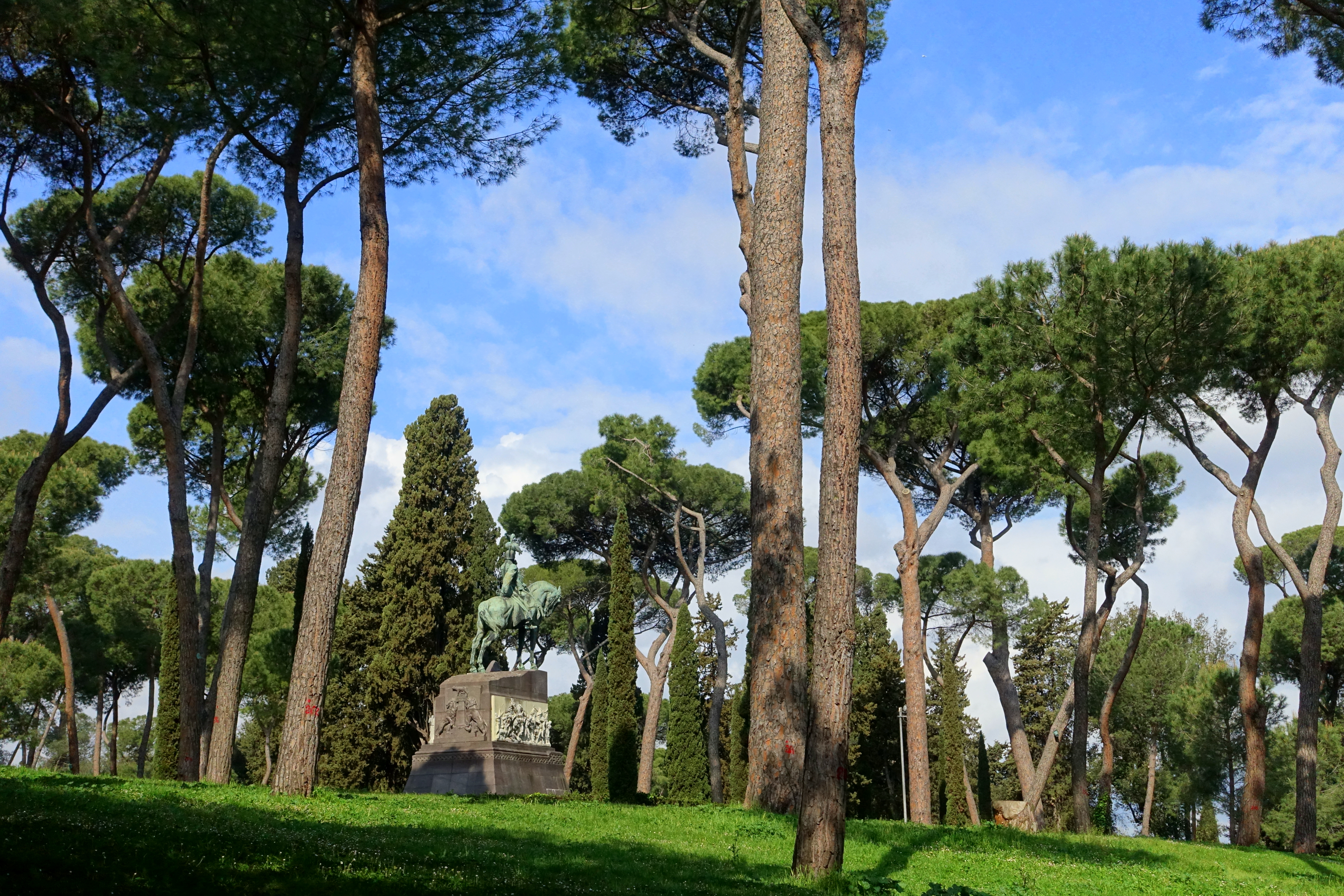
Adult stone pines at Villa Borghese gardens, Rome

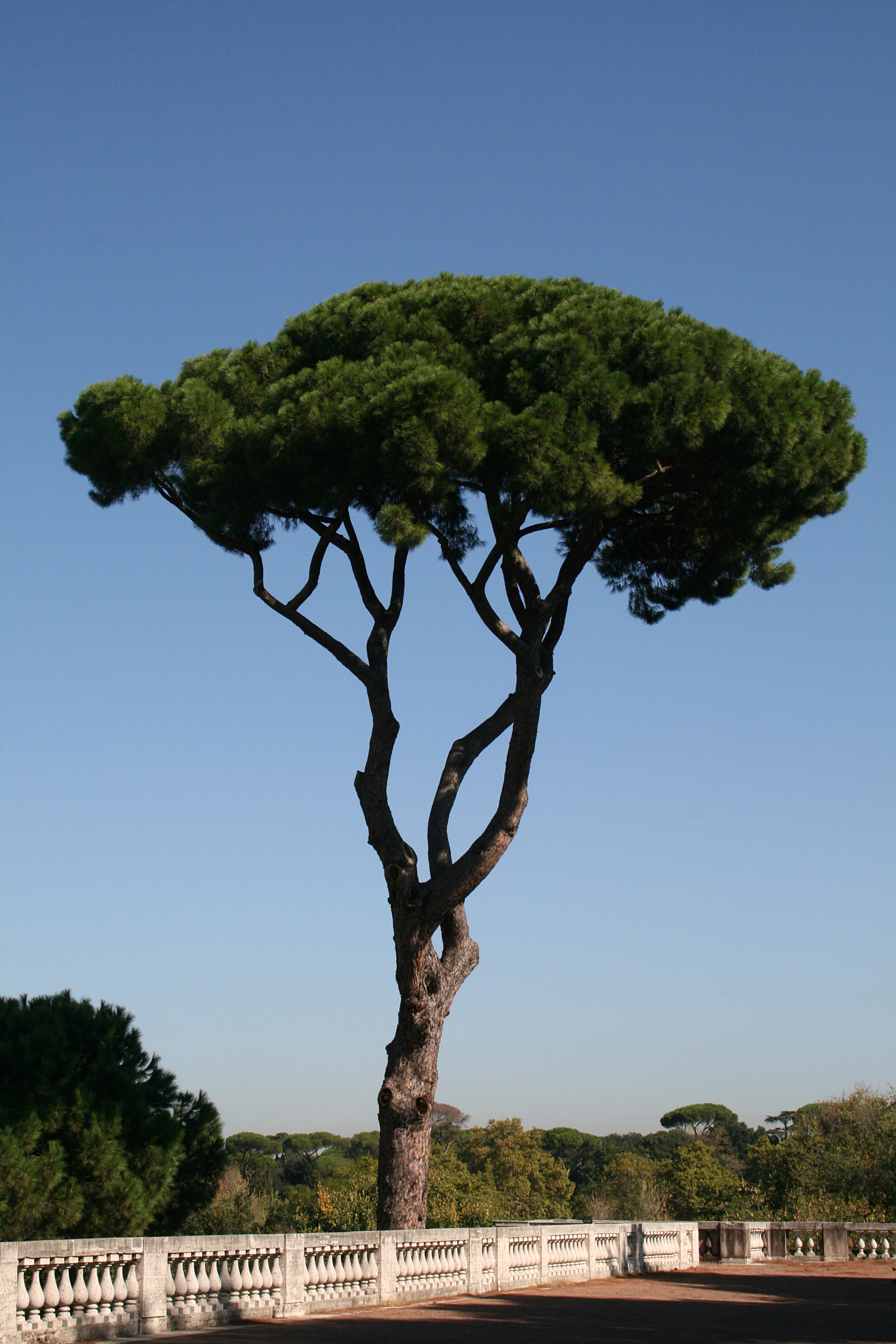
Pine at Villa Medici, Rome

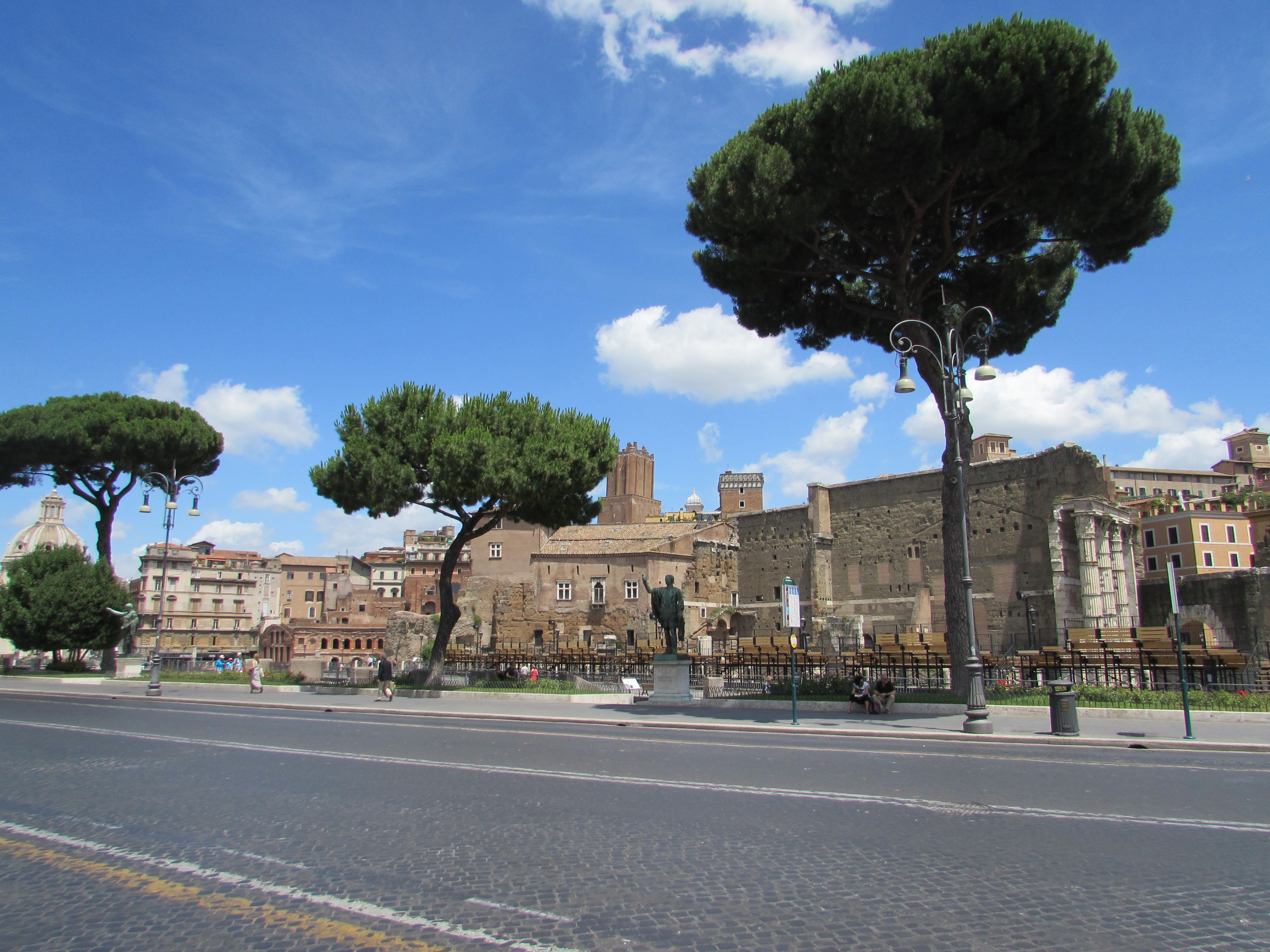
The tree is among the symbols of Rome and its historic streets, such as the Via dei Fori Imperiali.

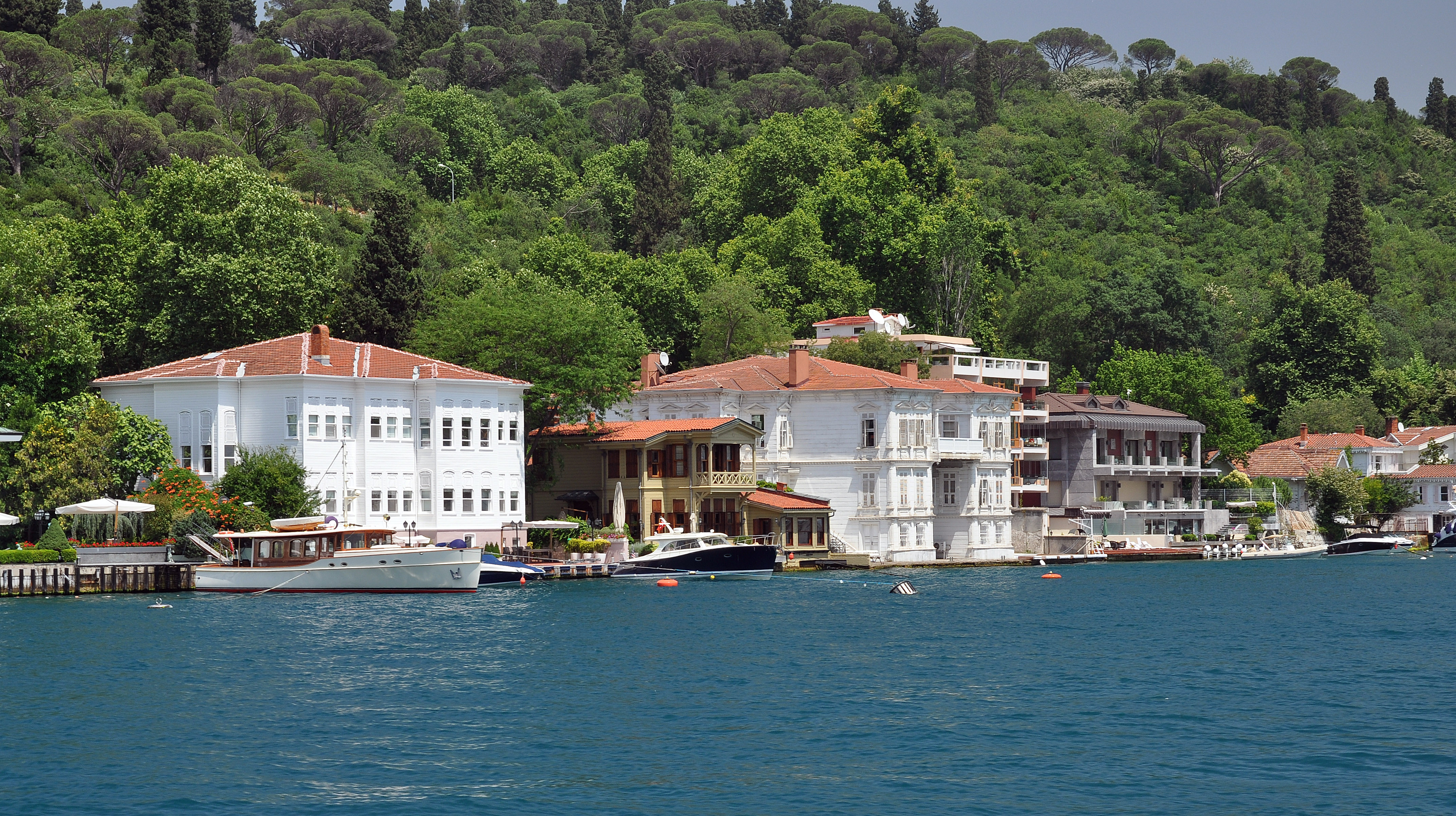
Stone pines were planted on the hills of the Bosphorus strait in Istanbul for ornamental purposes during the Ottoman period.

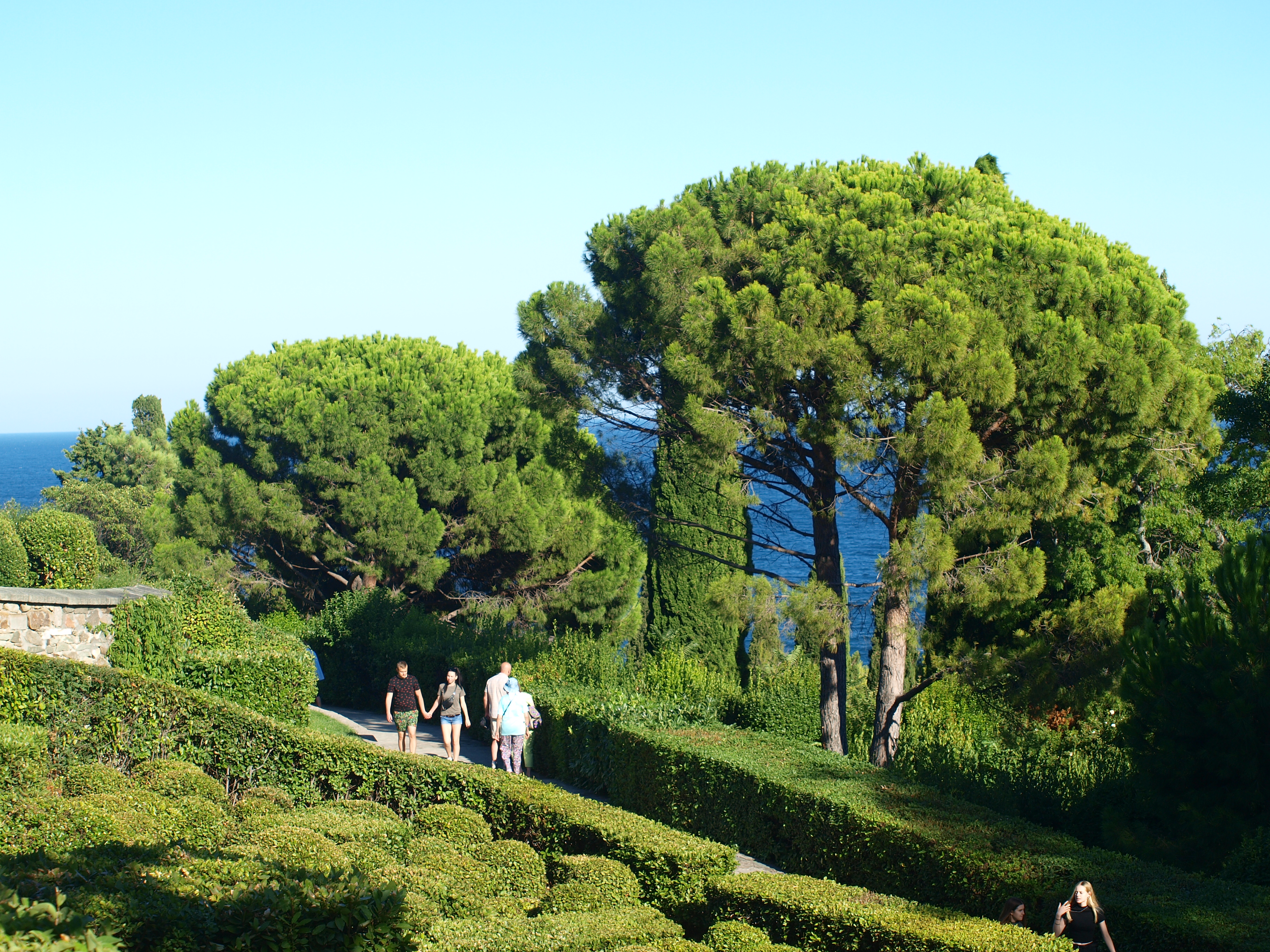
Stone pines on the Crimean Riviera, Ukraine

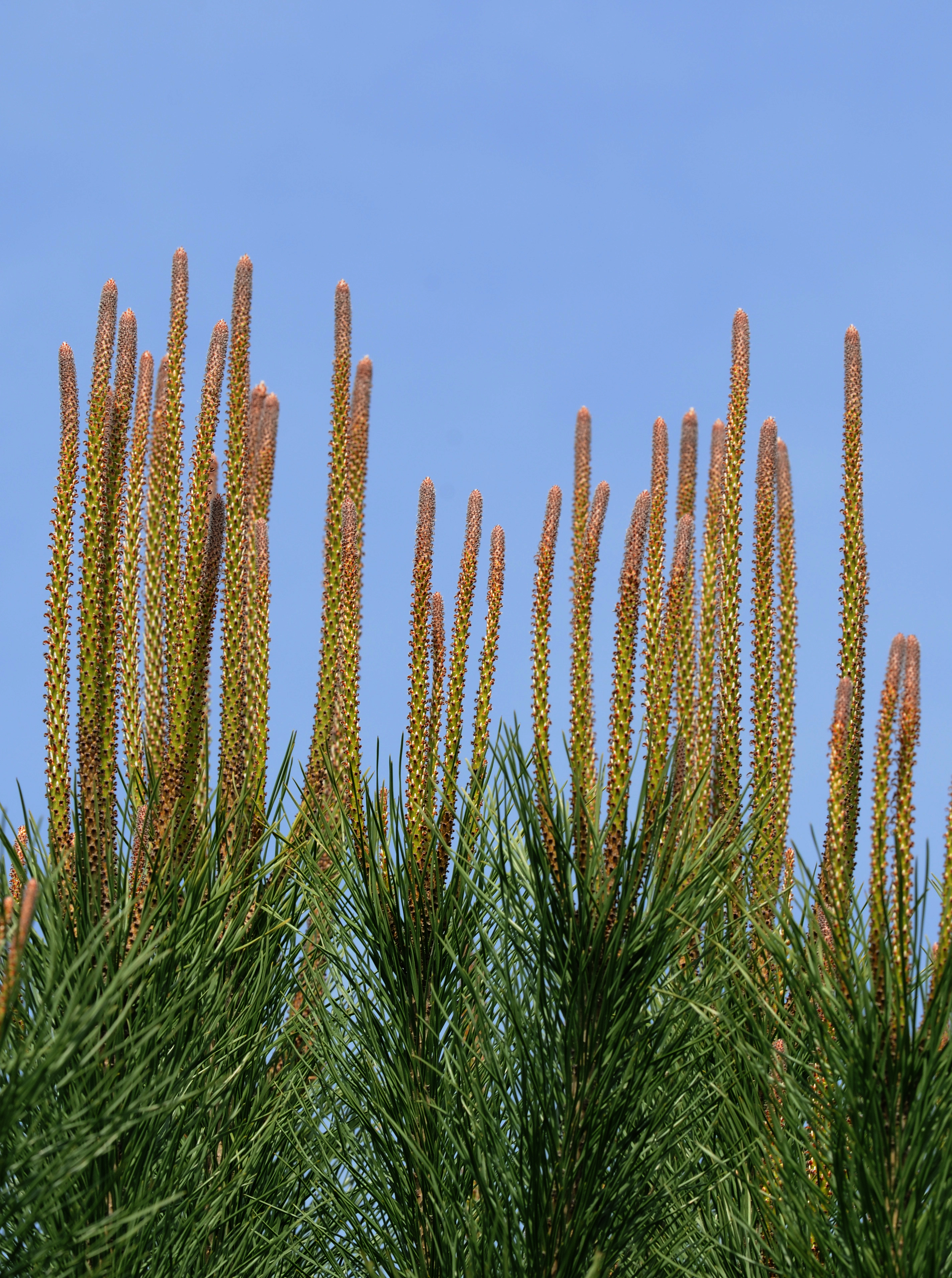
Fresh shoots with female strobili

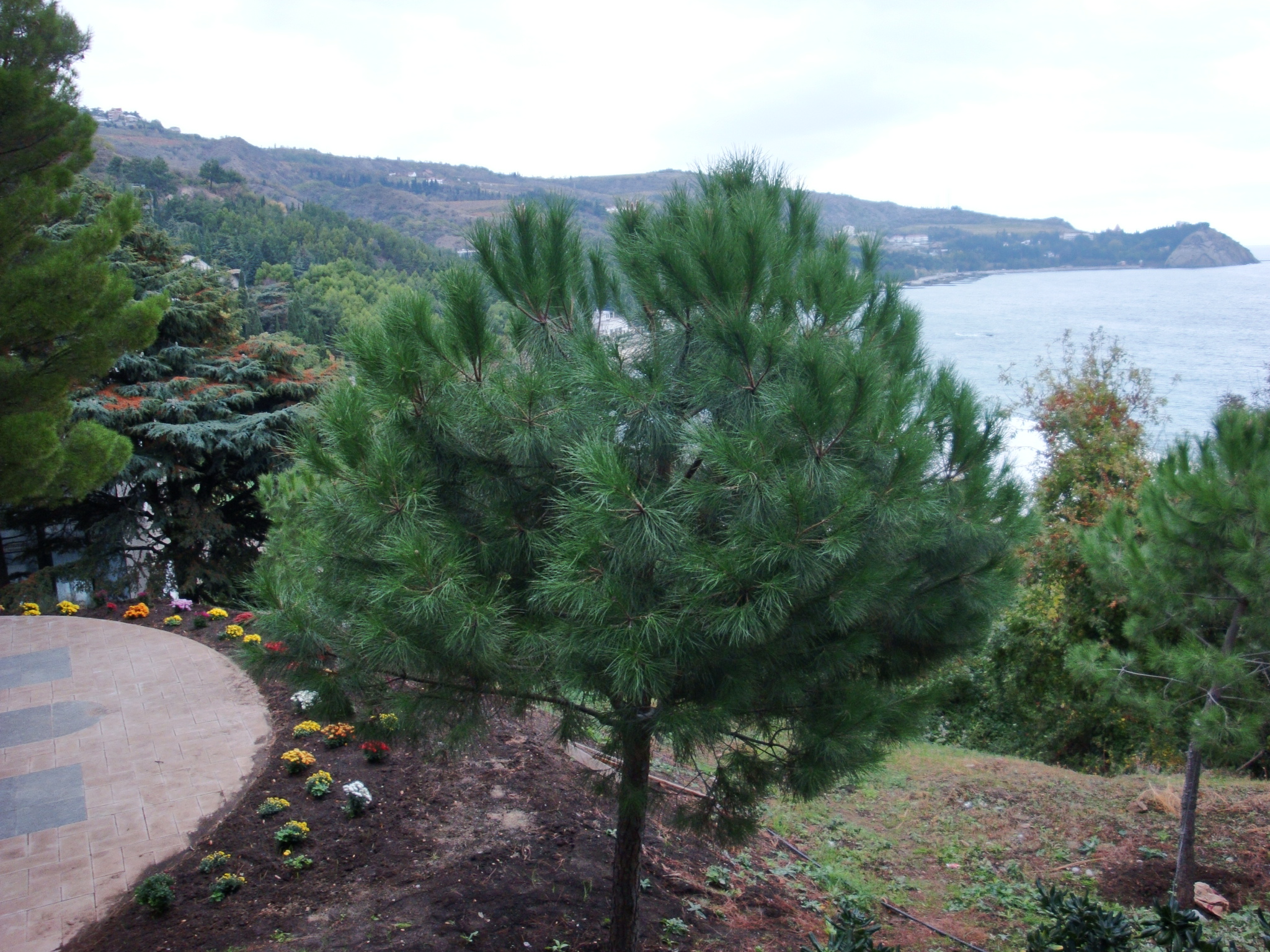
Young tree in Crimea, Ukraine

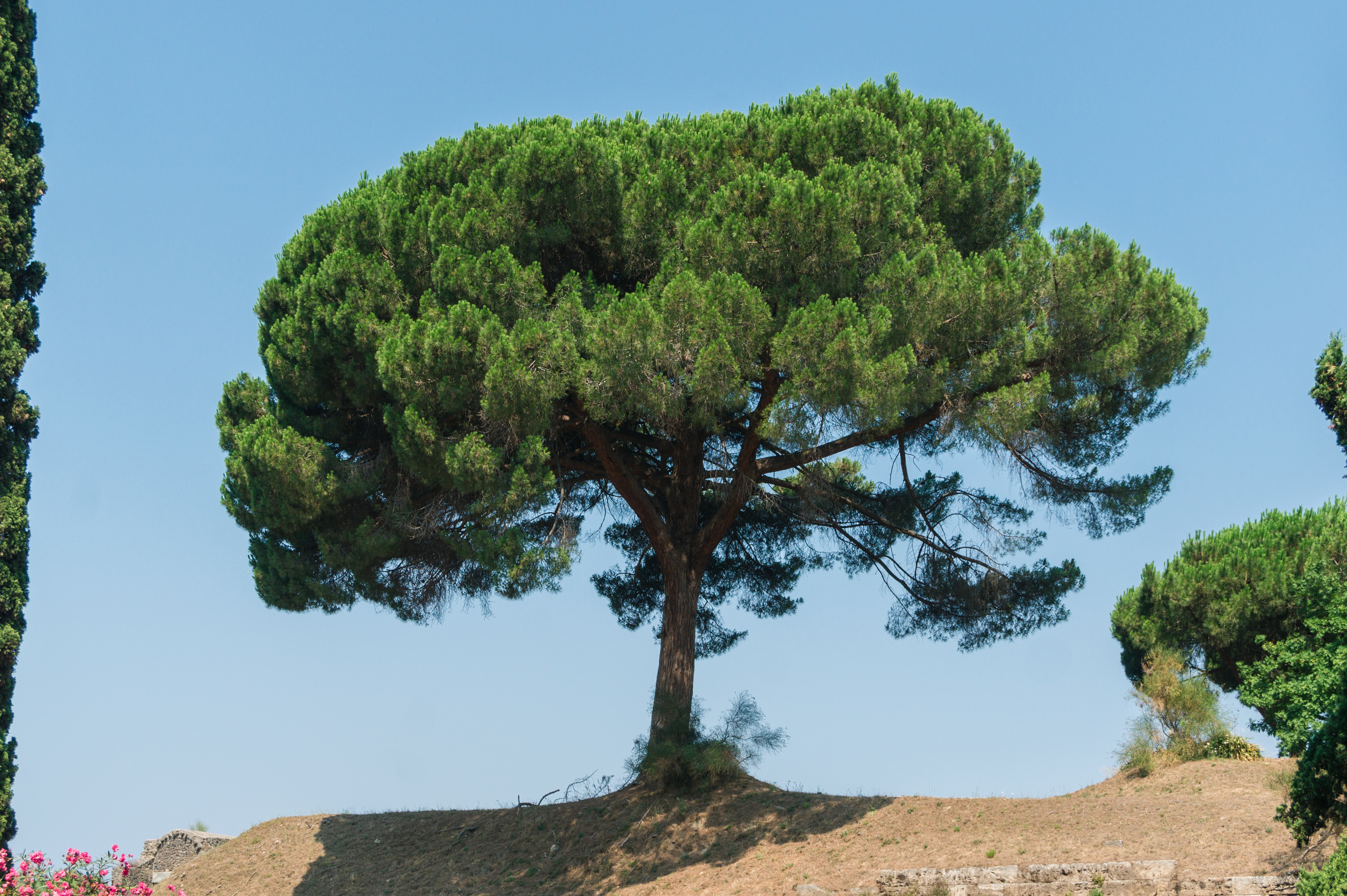
Tree in Pompeii

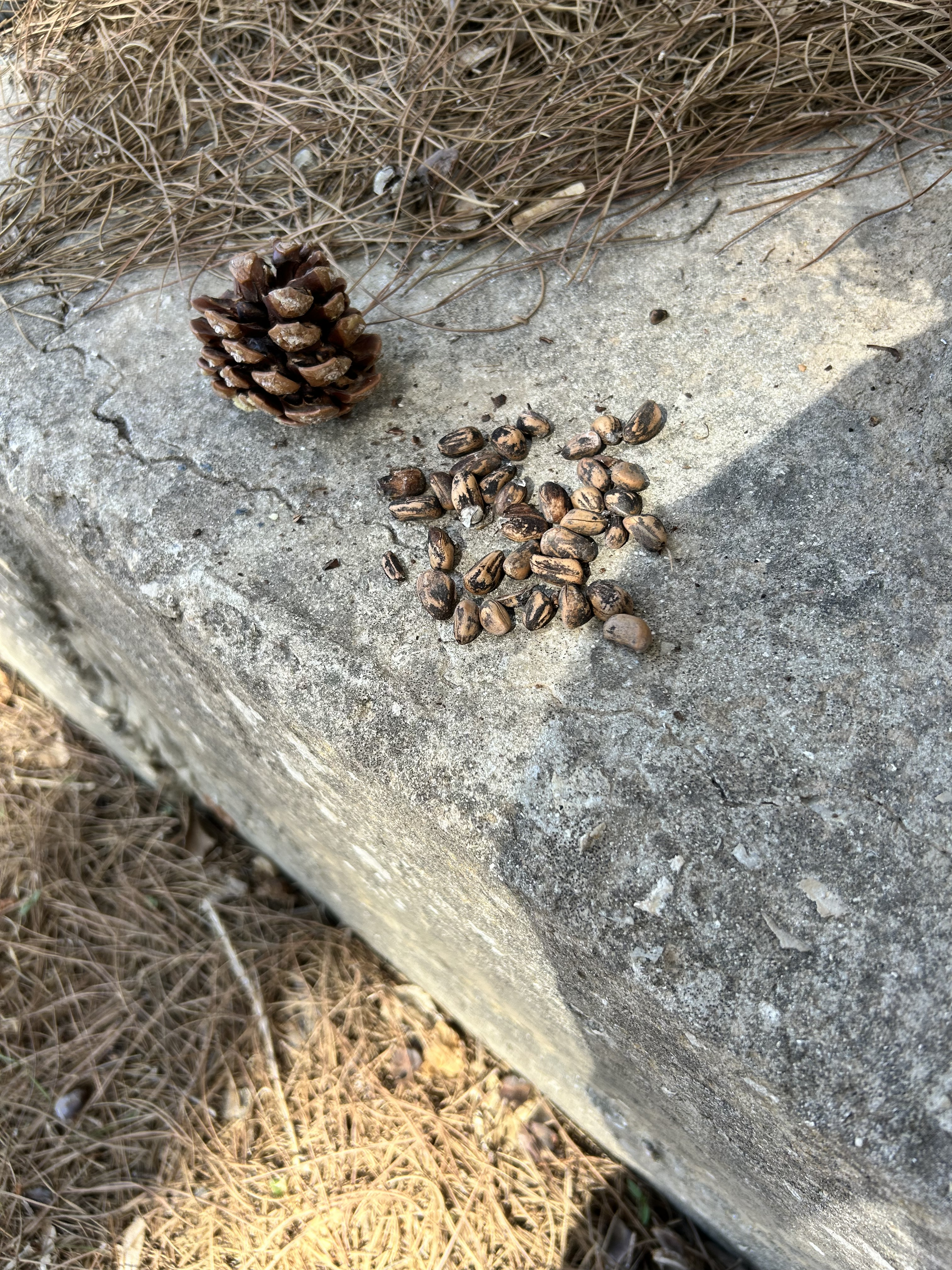
Open cone and seeds in Israel
