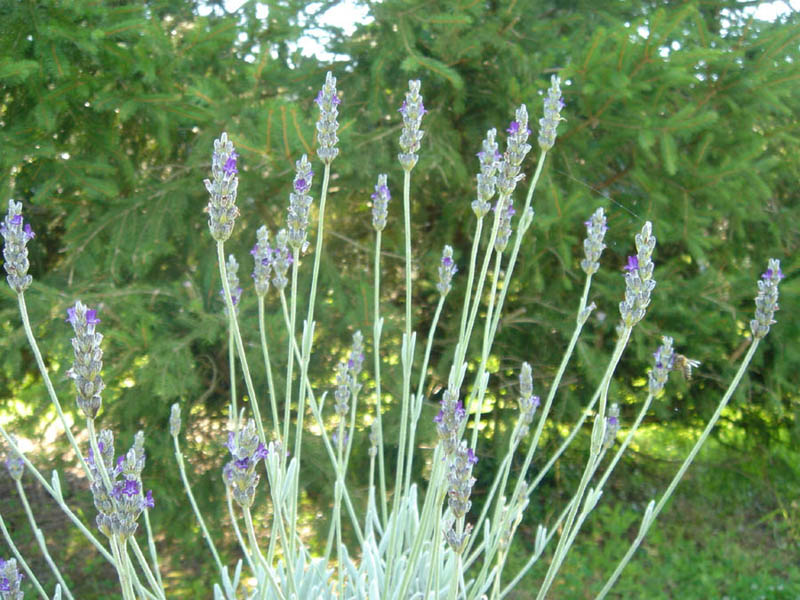

Conservation status
- Least Concern (IUCN 3.1)

Scientific classification
- Kingdom: Plantae
- Clade: Tracheophytes
- Clade: Angiosperms
- Clade: Eudicots
- Clade: Asterids
- Order: Lamiales
- Family: Lamiaceae
- Genus: Lavandula
- Species: L. lanata

Binomial name
- Lavandula lanata Boiss.

Synonyms
- Lavandula tomentosa (Lundmark) Pau

= Lavandula lanata =

Species of plant in the mint family

Lavandula lanata, the woolly lavender, is a species of flowering plant in the family Lamiaceae, native to southern Spain. An evergreen dwarf shrub growing to 1 m (3.3 ft) tall and broad, it is noted for the pronounced silver woolly hairs on its leaves, whence the Latin specific epithet lanata. The deep violet purple flowers are borne on narrow spikes, and give off the familiar lavender scent.

Lavandula lanata is cultivated in temperate zones for its attractive appearance and fragrance. It is hardy in mild and coastal areas, tolerating temperatures down to about −5 °C (23 °F), but preferring a warm, sheltered location in full sun. It has gained the Royal Horticultural Society's Award of Garden Merit.
