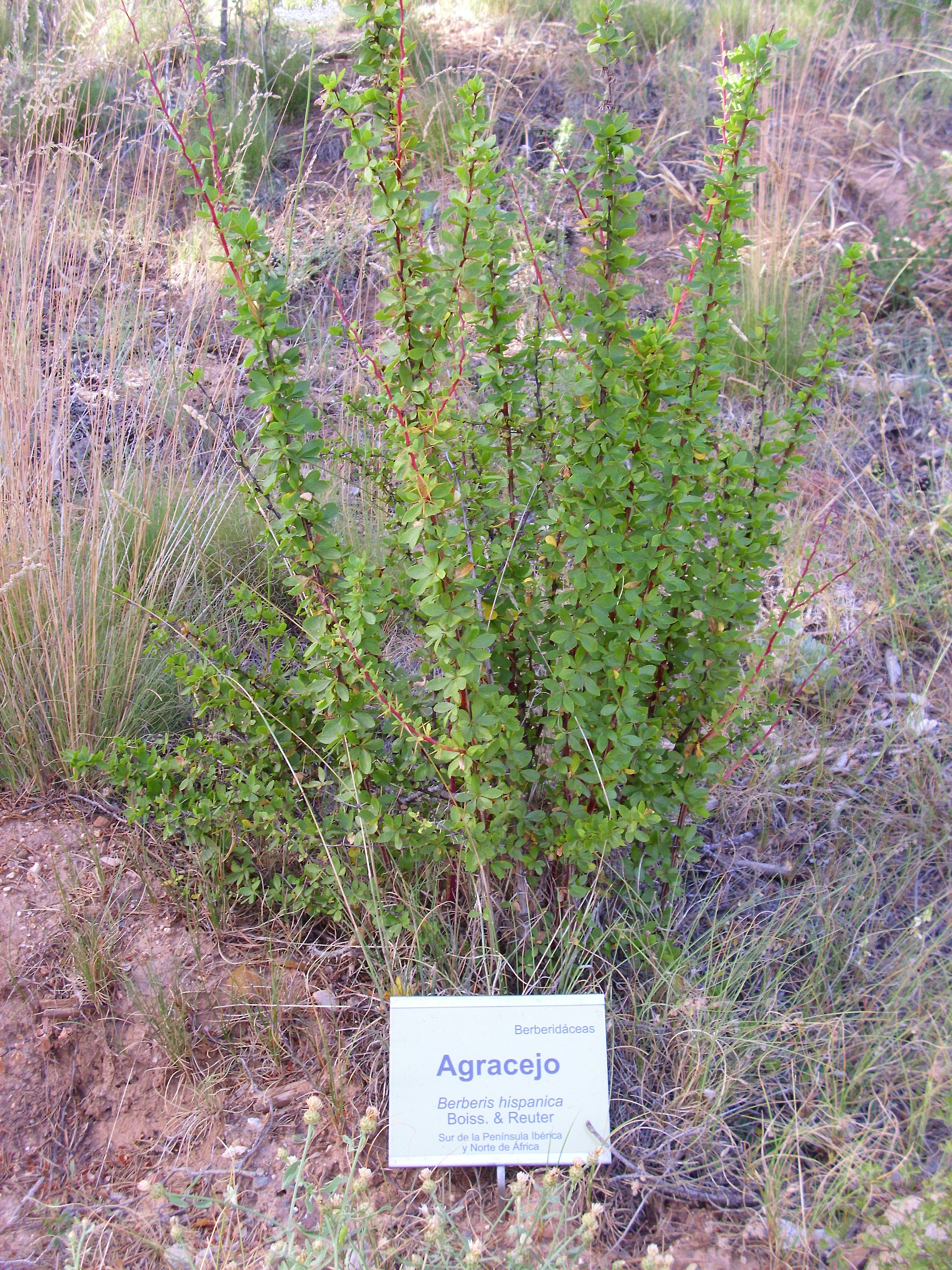

Scientific classification
- Kingdom: Plantae
- Clade: Tracheophytes
- Clade: Angiosperms
- Clade: Eudicots
- Order: Ranunculales
- Family: Berberidaceae
- Genus: Berberis
- Species: B. vulgaris
- Subspecies: B. v. subsp. australis

Trinomial name
- Berberis vulgaris subsp. australis (Boiss.) Heywood

Synonyms
- Berberis australis Hochr.; Berberis hispanica Boiss. & Reut.; Berberis vulgaris subsp. hispanica (Boiss. & Reut.) Malag.; Berberis vulgaris var. australis Boiss.

= Berberis vulgaris subsp. australis =

Species of shrub

Berberis vulgaris subsp. australis, synonym Berberis hispanica, is a shrub belonging to the family Berberidaceae and the genus Berberis (pronounced bẽr’ber-is). It is a woody plant and parts of the plant are considered toxic, although the berries are edible and juicy.

== Description ==
Berberis vulgaris subsp. australis is a deciduous shrub growing up to 3 m (10 ft) high. The stems and young branches are reddish or dark purple. The bark is covered with 3 to 5 branched spines, which are bracts or modified leaves. The central spine is usually larger. The leaves are oval, arranged in fascicles on short peduncles originated in the axils of the spines. The leaves are thick, leathery, similar to the size of the spines, and 1 to 5 cm long. Each leaf is attached to a short petiole.

The flowers are yellow. They form raceme inflorescence and make clusters of 3 to 9 flowers attached in a long panicle. Each flower is about 6 mm in diameter. The sepals are oval and entire. The petals are similar to sepals. The interiors of the flowers are filled with nectar at base. The flowers usually contain six stamens. The fruits are oblong lilacs or blue berries. The fruits are 1 cm long and covered with wax. The berries contain two seeds. The flowers are mature from April to June.

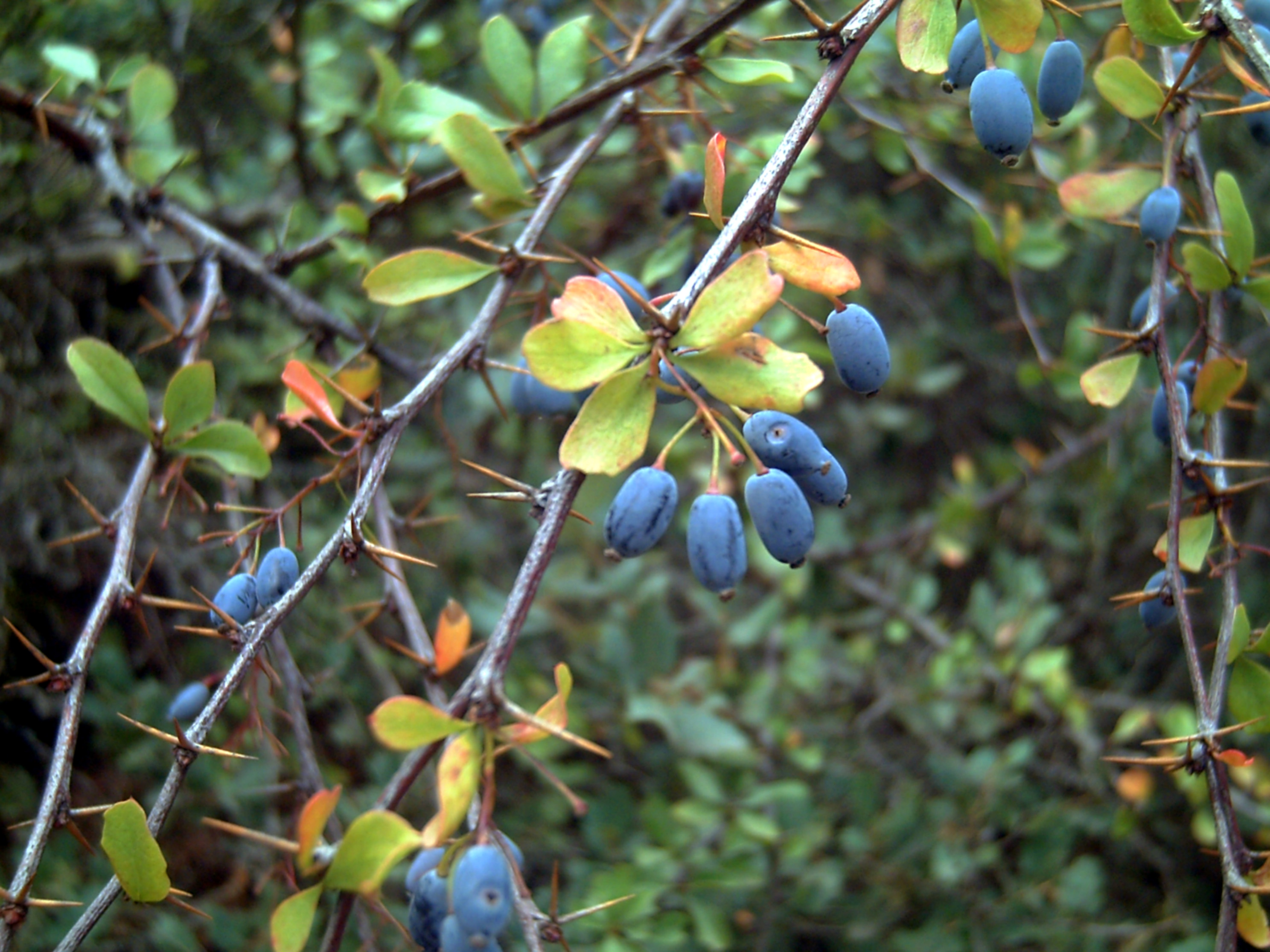
At Arboretum La Alfaguara

== Taxonomy ==
The taxon was first described by Pierre Edmond Boissier in 1839 as Berberis vulgaris var. australis. In 1852, Boissier and Georges François Reuter described Berberis hispanica as a separate species. In 1904, Bénédict P. G. Hochreutiner raised B. vulgaris var. australis to the full species Berberis australis, treating B. hispanica as a synonym. In 1961, Vernon Heywood treated the taxon as a subspecies, B. vulgaris subsp. australis, rather than as a variety or species, a treatment accepted by Plants of the World Online as of March 2024.

== Distribution ==
Berberis vulgaris subsp. australis is native southern Spain, Morocco and Algeria. It appears from 1000 m or up to 2000 m in elevation. It is found on hedges of mountains overlooking the Mediterranean.

== Uses ==
The root and flowers have been used to extract yellow dyes. The fruits are sweet and sour tastes. The fruits have been used to produce syrups and soft drinks. The fruits are rich in Vitamin C. The bark contains an alkaloid, Berberine. It stimulates the uterus and the intestine. It may cause liver complaints, rheumatism and sciatica. Some species of the genus Berberis are used as ornamental plants. Barberry is often parasitized by the fungus Puccinia graminis and becoming part of the life cycle of the fungus. For this reason, barberry was removed from many places.
