= Central Anatolia region =

Region in West Asia

Coordinates: 39°00′N 33°00′E

Central Anatolia region İç Anadolu Bölgesi
- Region
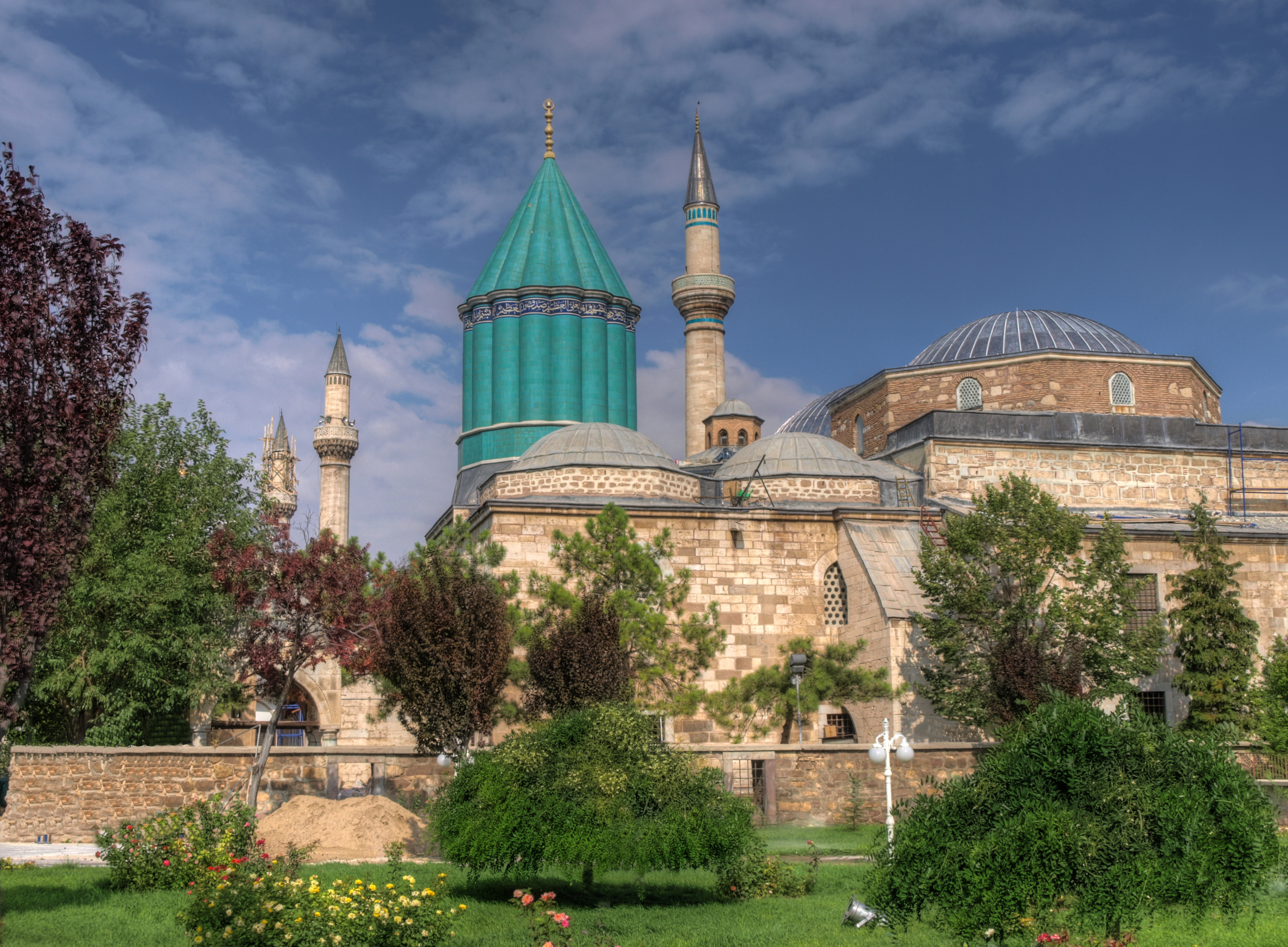
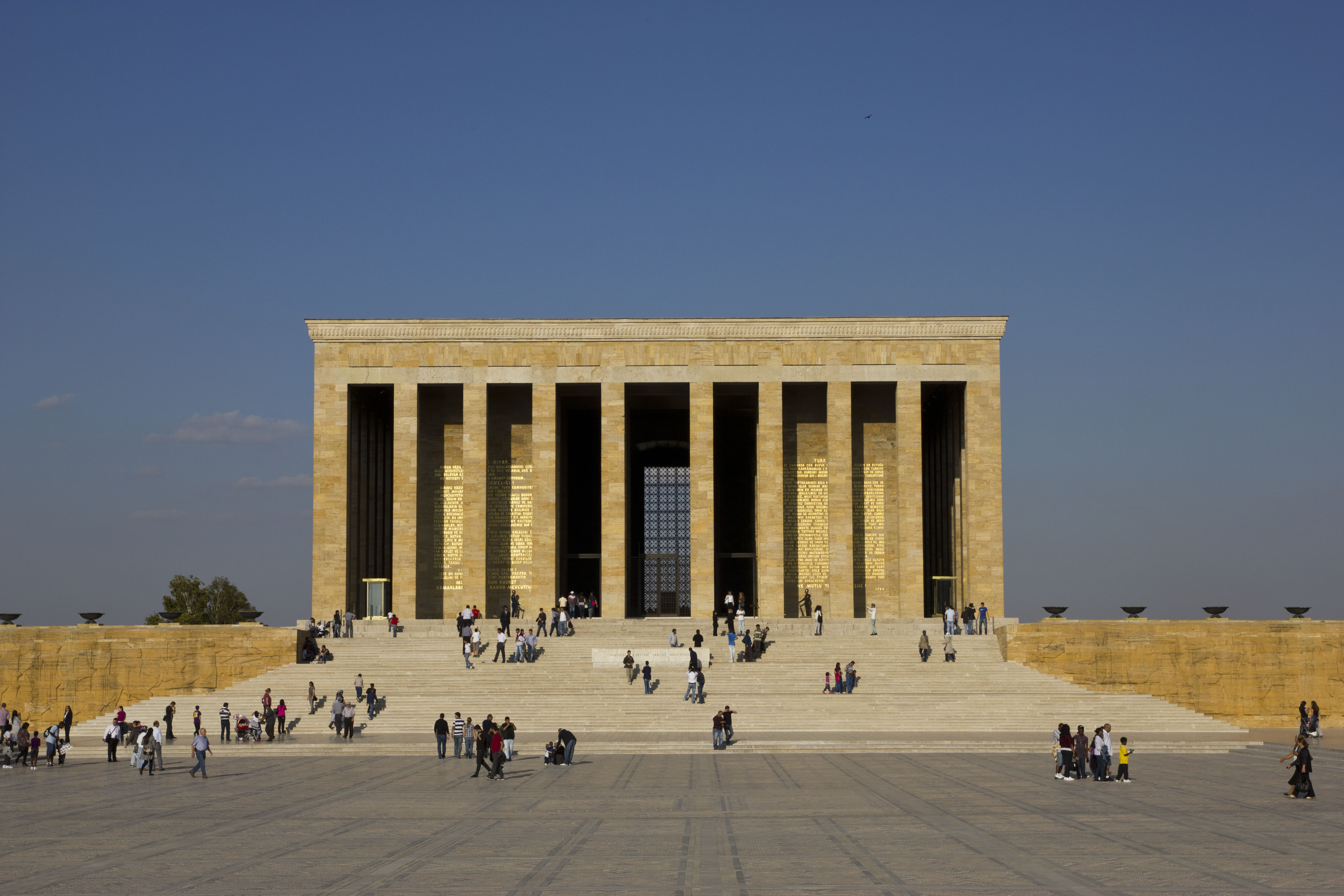
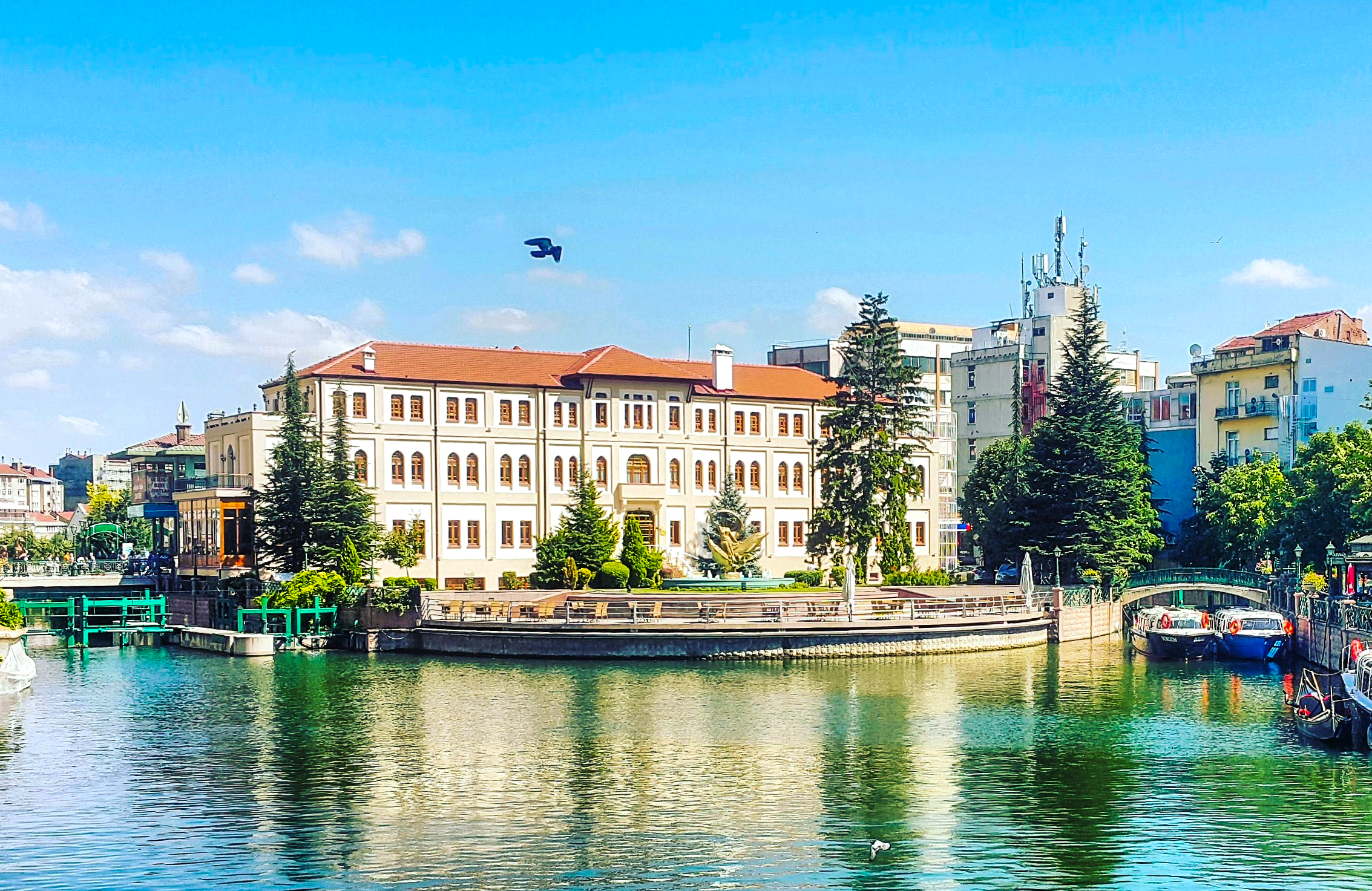
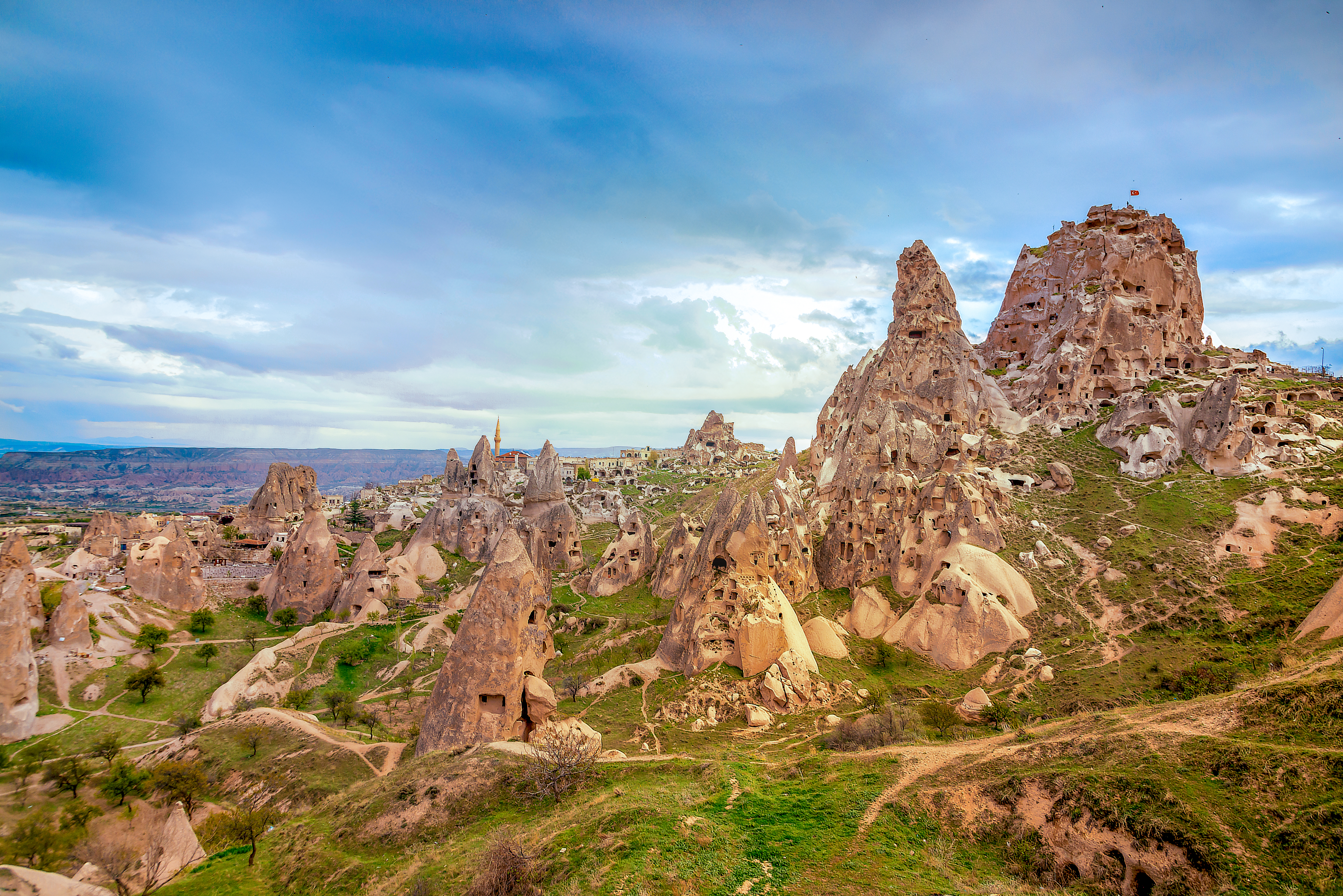
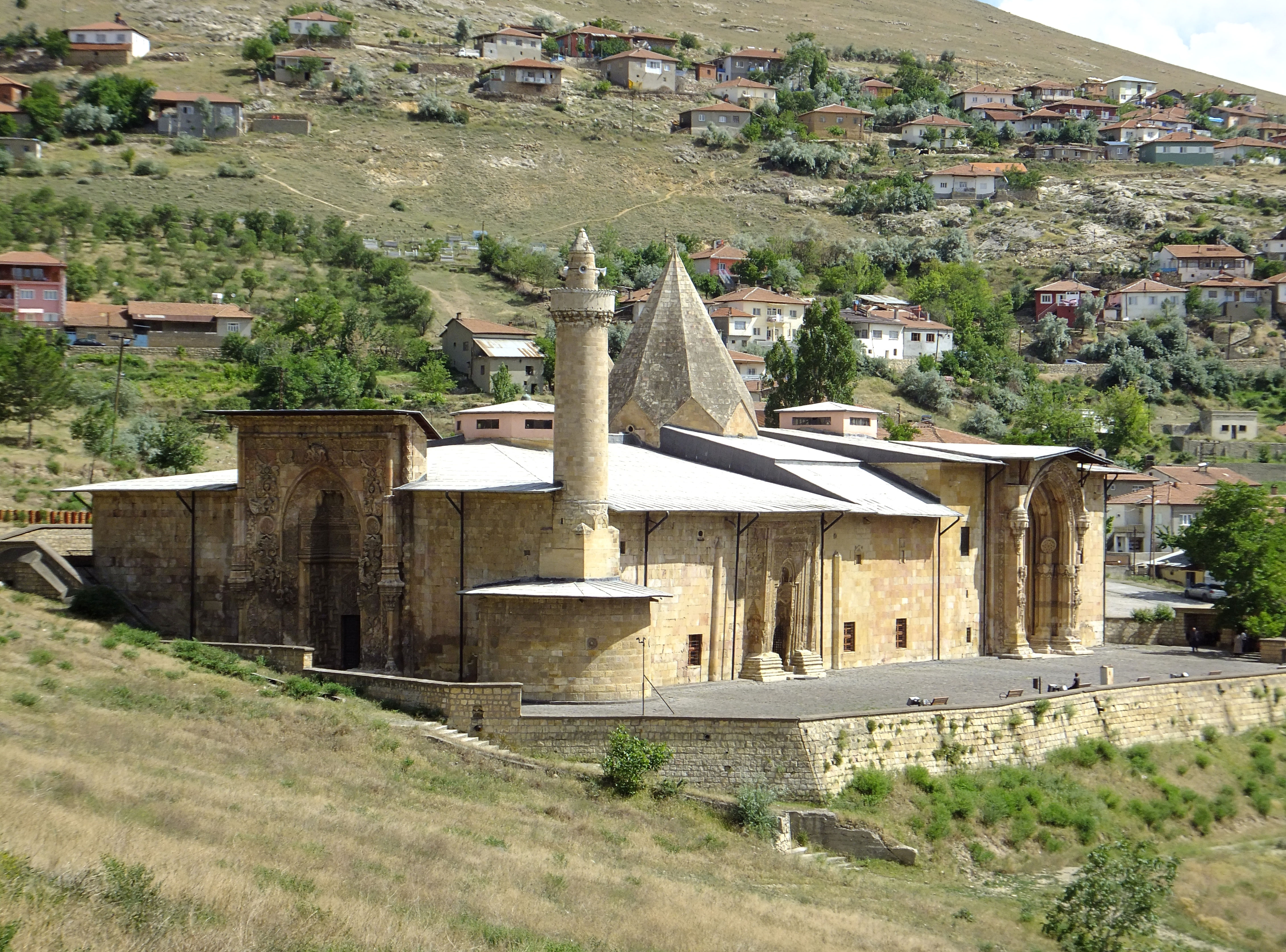
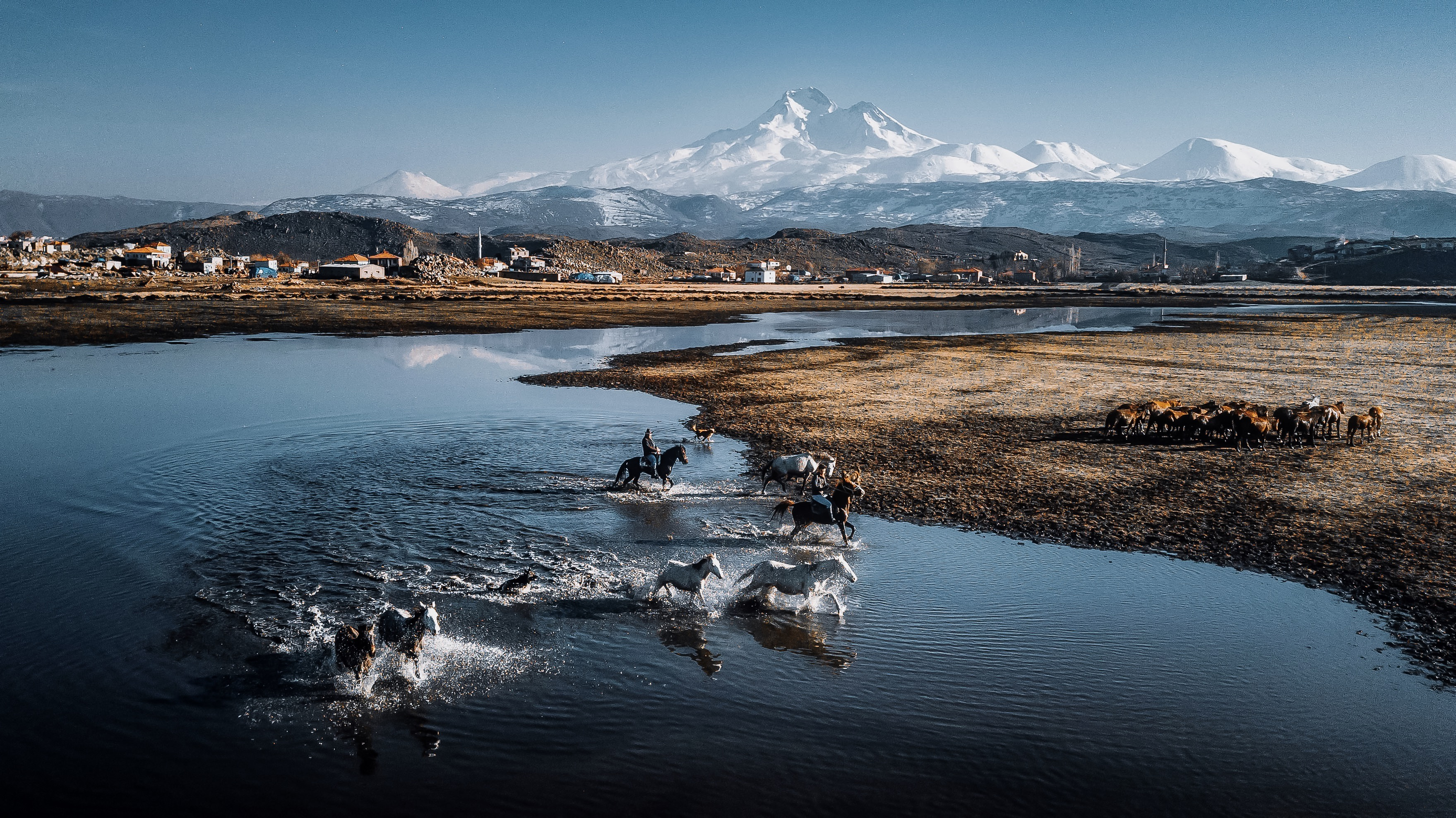

- Country: Turkey
- Capital: Ankara
- Provinces: 13: Aksaray; Kırıkkale; Kırşehir; Nevşehir; Niğde; Ankara; Çankırı; Eskişehir; Karaman; Kayseri; Konya; Sivas; Yozgat

Area
  - Total: 163,057 km^{2} (62,957 sq mi)
  - Rank: 2nd

Population
  - Total: 12,896,255
  - Density: 79.0905/km^{2} (204.843/sq mi)
- Demonym: Turkish: İç Anadolulu

GDP
  - Total: US$ 132.208 billion (2022)
  - Per capita: US$ 10,250 (2022)
- Time zone: UTC+03:00 (CET)
  - Summer (DST): UTC+03:00 (CEST)

The Central Anatolia region (Turkish: İç Anadolu Bölgesi) is a geographical region of Turkey. The largest city in the region is Ankara, the capital of Turkey. Other large cities are Konya, Kayseri, Eskişehir, Sivas, Aksaray and Kırşehir.

Located in Central Turkey, it is bordered by the Aegean region to the west, the Black Sea region to the north, the Eastern Anatolia region to the east, and the Mediterranean region to the south. It also shares a very slight border with the Marmara region in Bilecik Province.

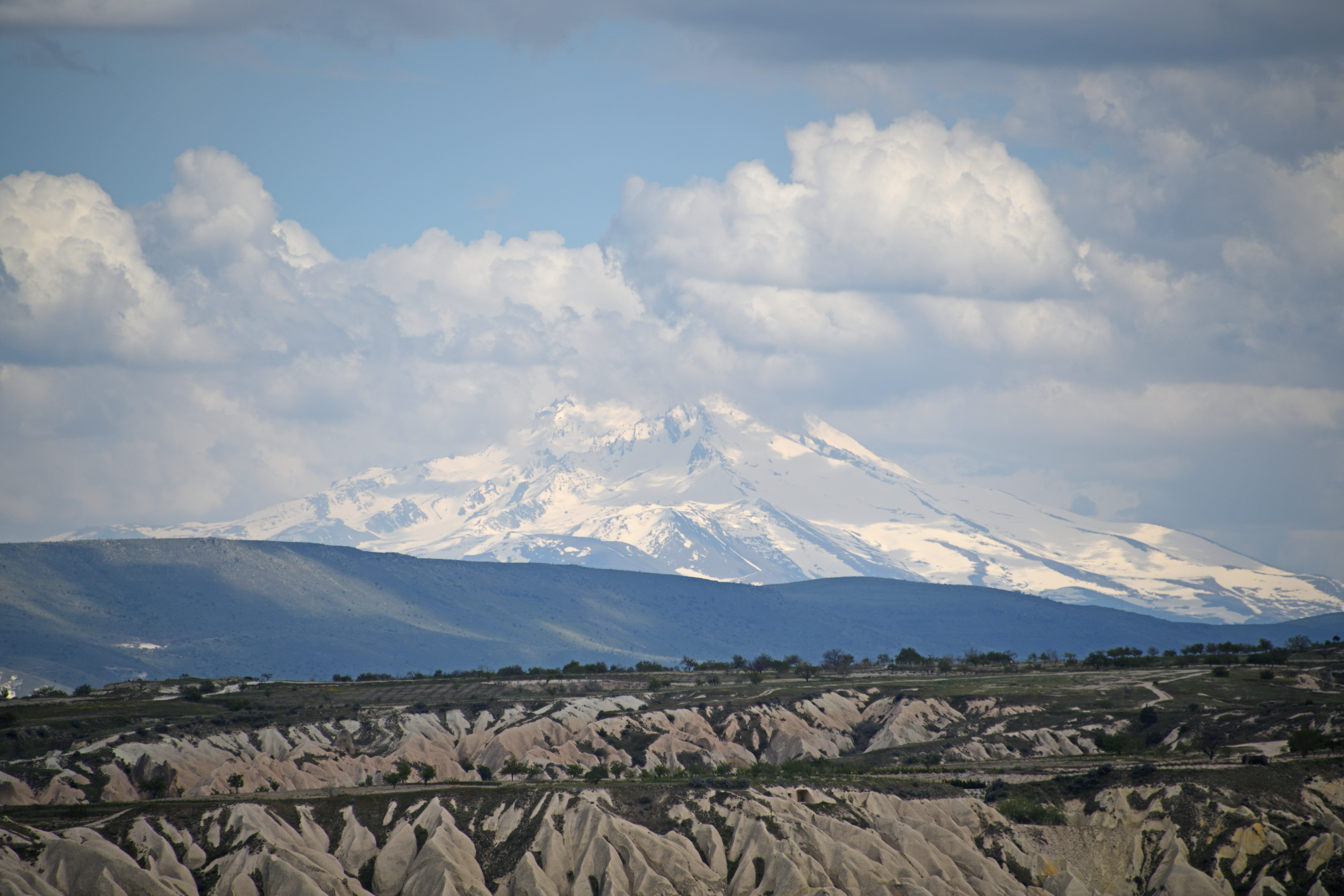
Mount Erciyes near Kayseri

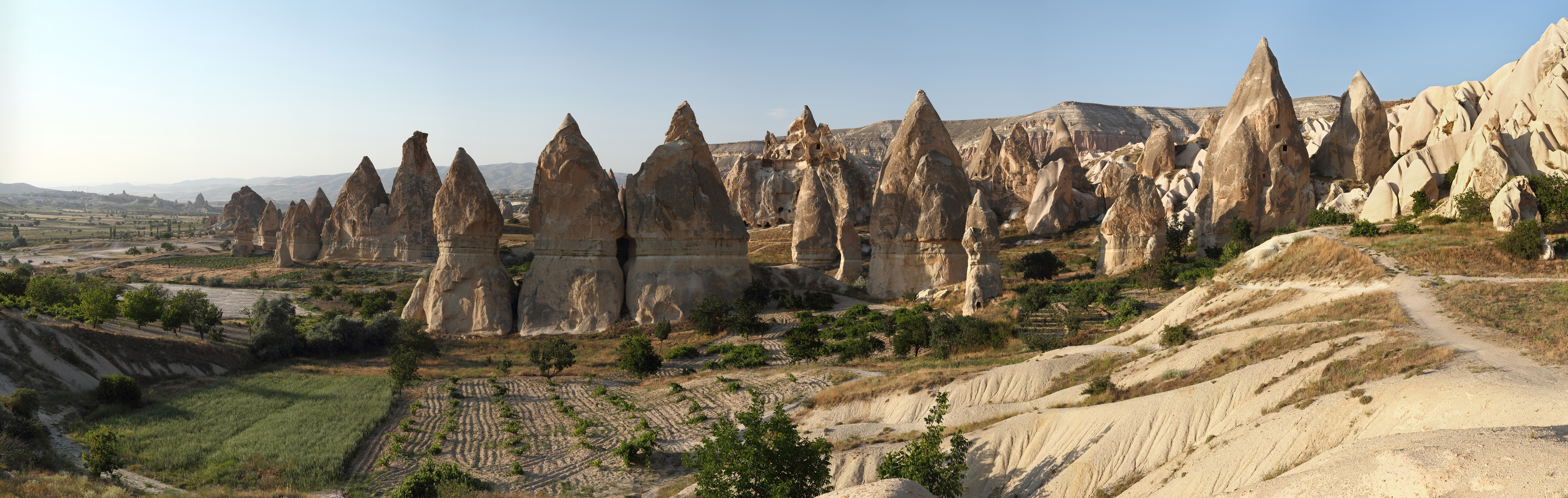
Panoramic view of the Fairy Chimneys in Cappadocia

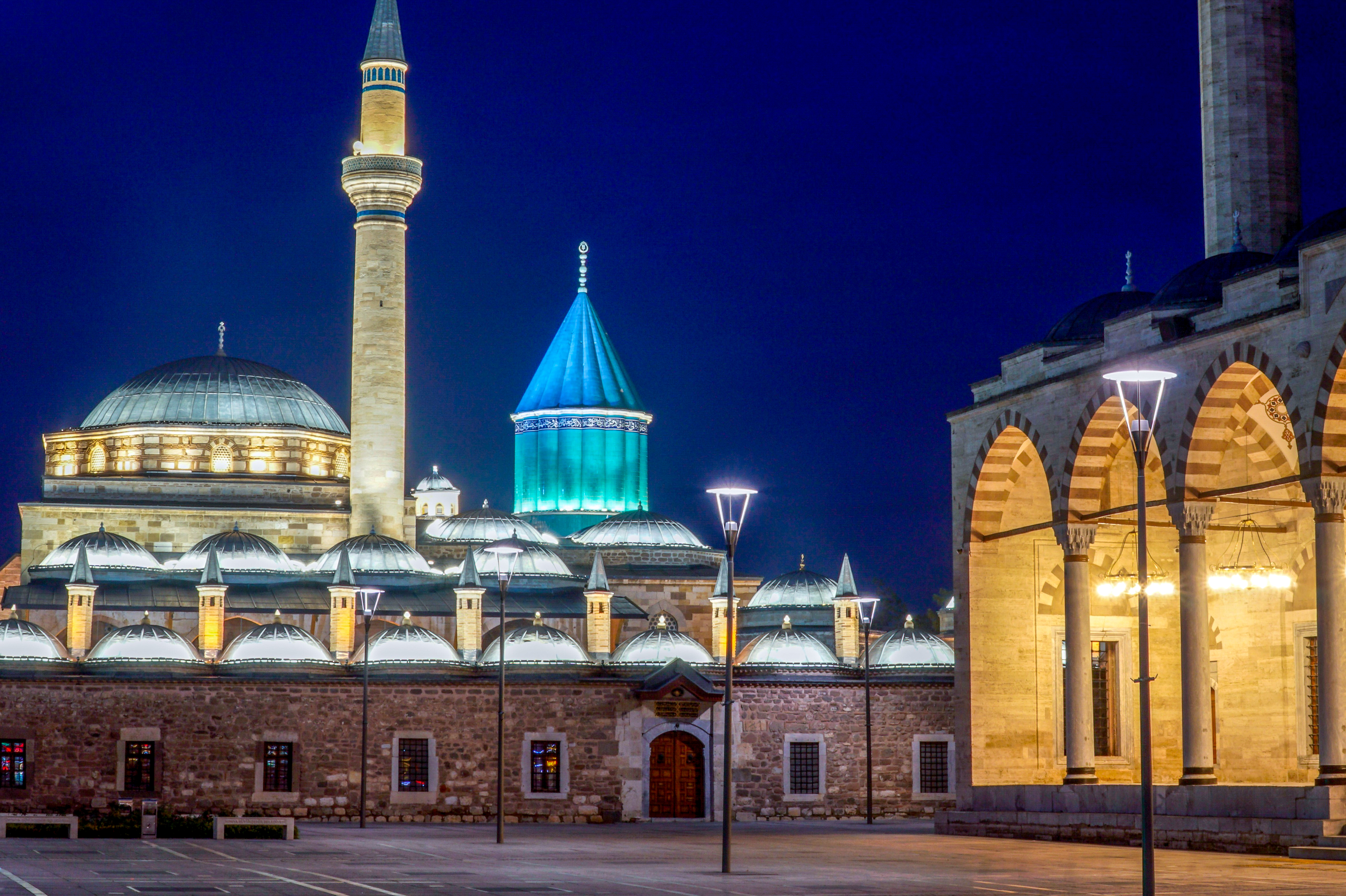
Konya

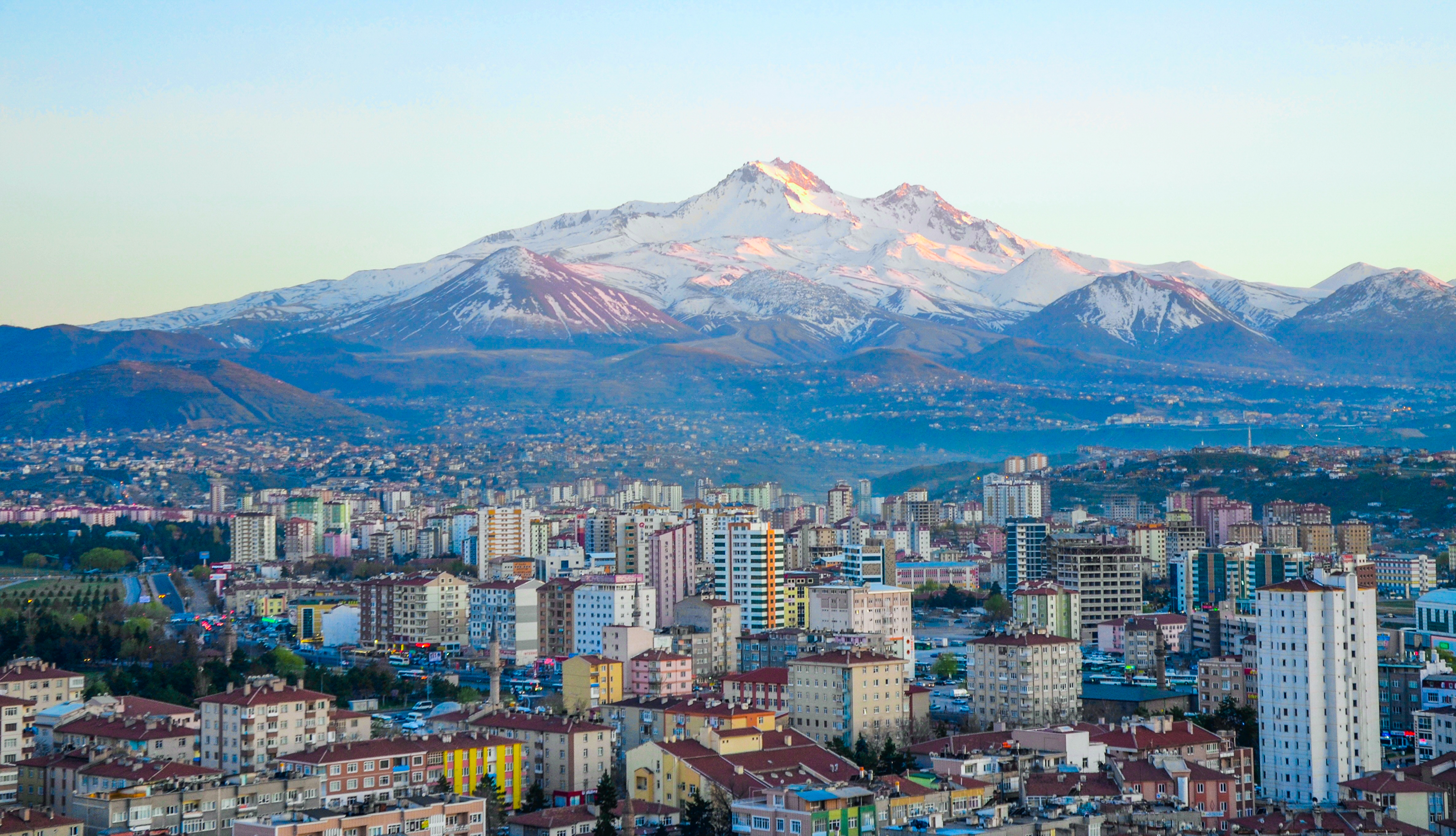
Kayseri

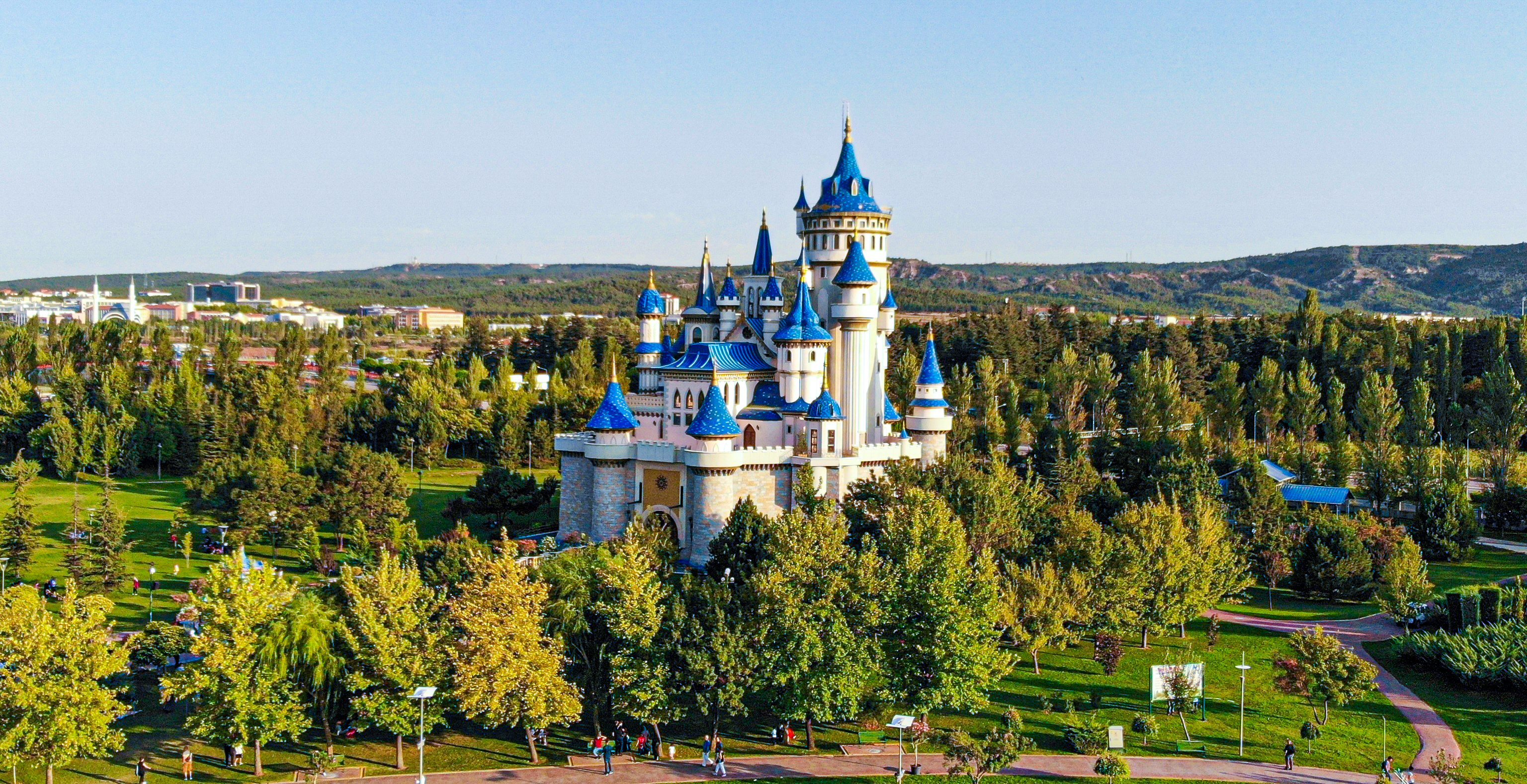
Eskişehir

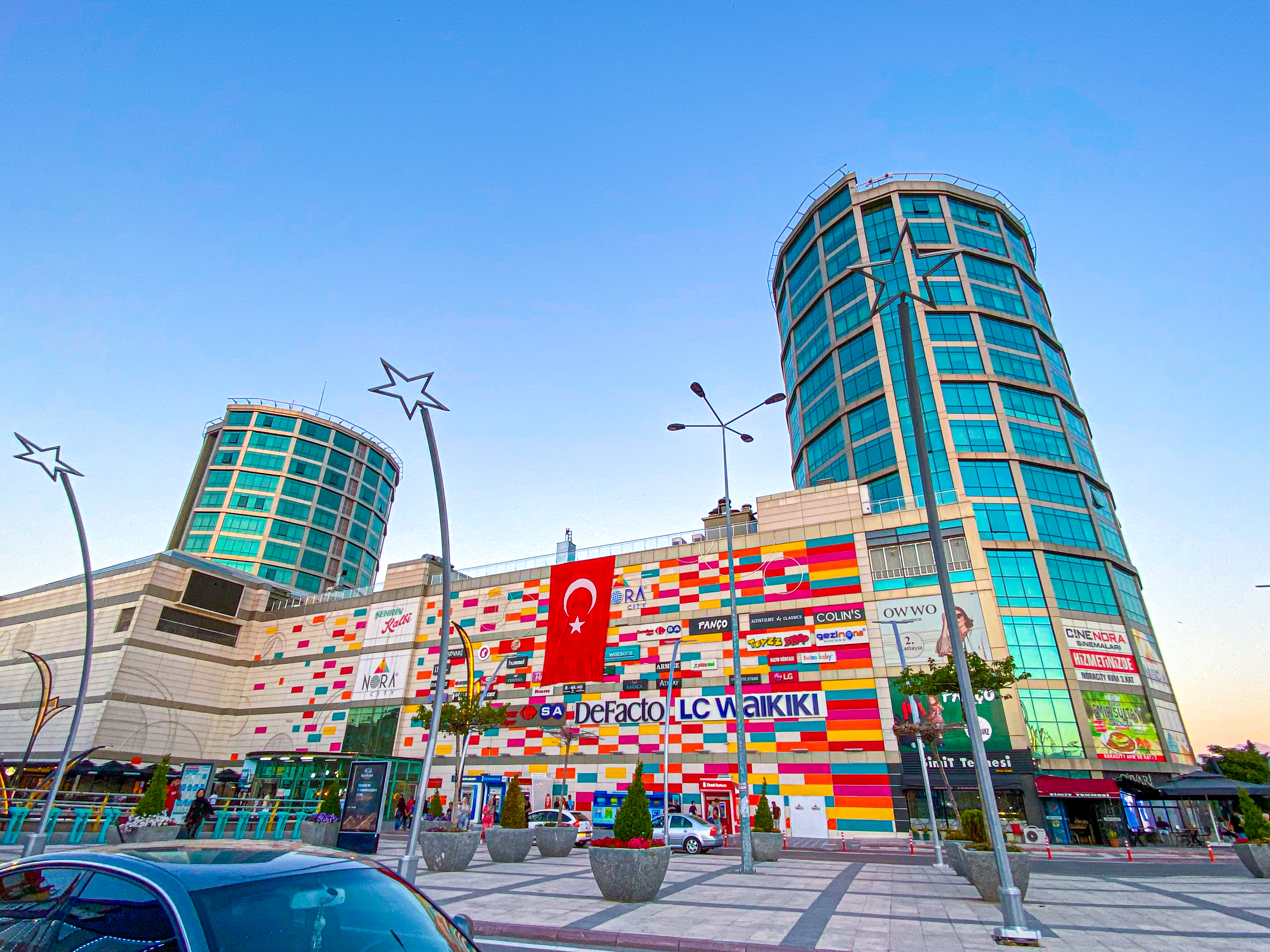
Aksaray

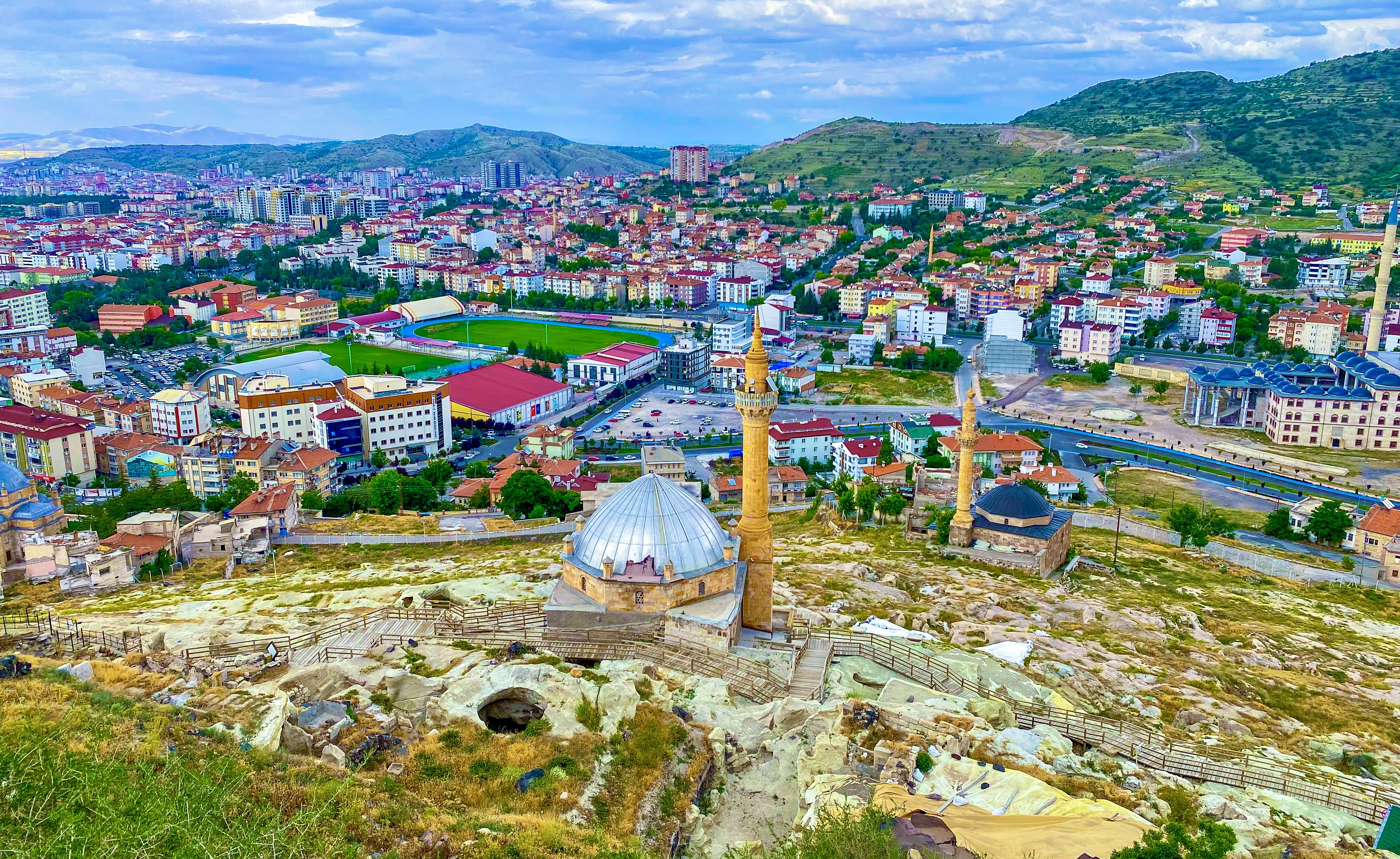
Nevşehir

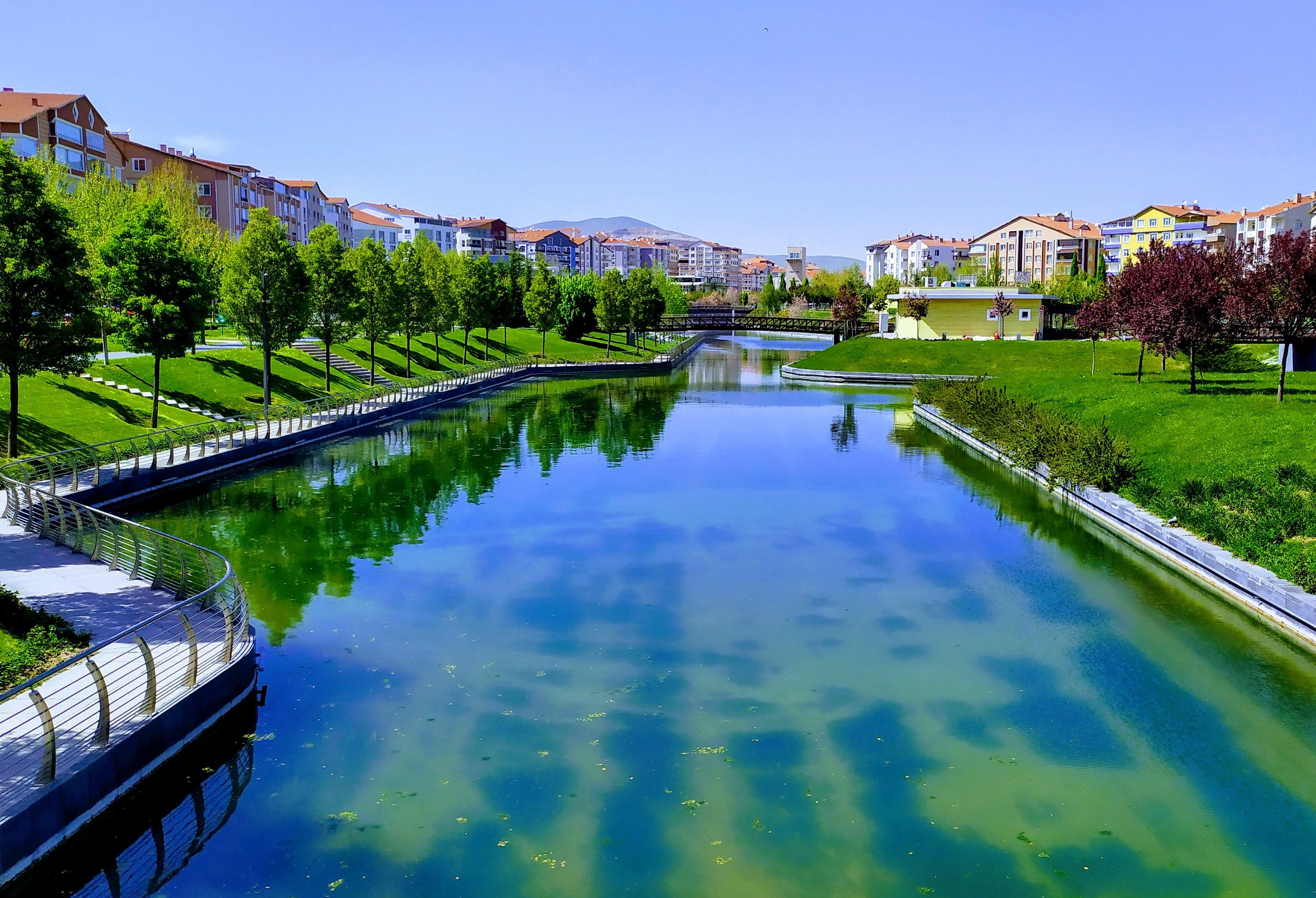
Kırşehir

== Subdivisions ==
Geographic subdivisions of the Central Anatolia region include:

- Konya section (Turkish: Konya Bölümü)
  - Obruk plateau (Turkish: Obruk Platosu)
  - Konya–Ereğli vicinity (Turkish: Konya - Ereğli Çevresi)
- Upper Sakarya section (Turkish: Yukarı Sakarya Bölümü)
  - Ankara area (Turkish: Ankara Yöresi)
  - Porsuk gully (Turkish: Porsuk Oluğu)
  - Sündiken Mountains (Turkish: Sündiken Dağları Yöresi)
  - Upper Sakarya valley (Turkish: Yukarı Sakarya Yöresi)
- Middle Kızılırmak section (Turkish: Orta Kızılırmak Bölümü)
- Upper Kızılırmak section (Turkish: Yukarı Kızılırmak Bölümü)

== Ecoregions ==
=== Palearctic ===
Palearctic regions include:

==== Temperate broadleaf and mixed forests ====
Temperate broadleaf and mixed forests include:

- Central Anatolian deciduous forests
- Eastern Anatolian deciduous forests

=== Temperate coniferous forests ===
Temperate coniferous forests are Northern Anatolian conifer and deciduous forests.

=== Temperate grasslands, savannas and shrublands ===
Central Anatolian steppe are classified as Temperate grasslands, savannas and shrublands.

=== Mediterranean forests, woodlands, and scrub ===
Mediterranean forests, woodlands, and scrub include:

- Anatolian conifer and deciduous mixed forests
- Southern Anatolian montane conifer and deciduous forests

== Provinces ==
Provinces that are entirely in the Central Anatolia region:

- Aksaray
- Kırıkkale
- Kırşehir
- Nevşehir
- Niğde
- Yozgat

Provinces that are mostly in the Central Anatolia region:

- Ankara
- Çankırı
- Eskişehir
- Karaman
- Kayseri
- Konya
- Sivas

Provinces that are partially in the Central Anatolia region:

- Afyonkarahisar
- Bilecik
- Çorum
- Erzincan

== Climate ==
Central Anatolia has a semi-arid continental climate with hot, dry summers and cold, snowy winters. Most of the region usually has low precipitation throughout the year.

Sivas

Climate chart (precipitation, max. and min. temperature)
J	F	M	A	M	J	J	A	S	O	N	D
43 1 −7	40 3 −6	48 8 −2	65 15 4	62 20 7	34 24 10	12 28 13	7 29 12	18 25 9	39 18 5	44 10 0	44 4 −4
- █ Average max. and min. temperatures in °C
- █ Precipitation totals in mm
- Source: Turkish State Meteorology
Imperial conversion
J	F	M	A	M	J	J	A	S	O	N	D
1.7 33 19	1.6 37 21	1.9 47 29	2.5 60 38	2.4 68 45	1.3 75 50	0.5 82 55	0.3 83 54	0.7 77 48	1.5 65 40	1.7 50 31	1.7 38 25
- █ Average max. and min. temperatures in °F
- █ Precipitation totals in inches

== See also ==
- Geography of Turkey
- Lycaonia
- Galatia
- Phrygia
- Anatolia
- Eastern Anatolia region
- Southeastern Anatolia region
