= Central Anatolian steppe =

Turkish ecoregion

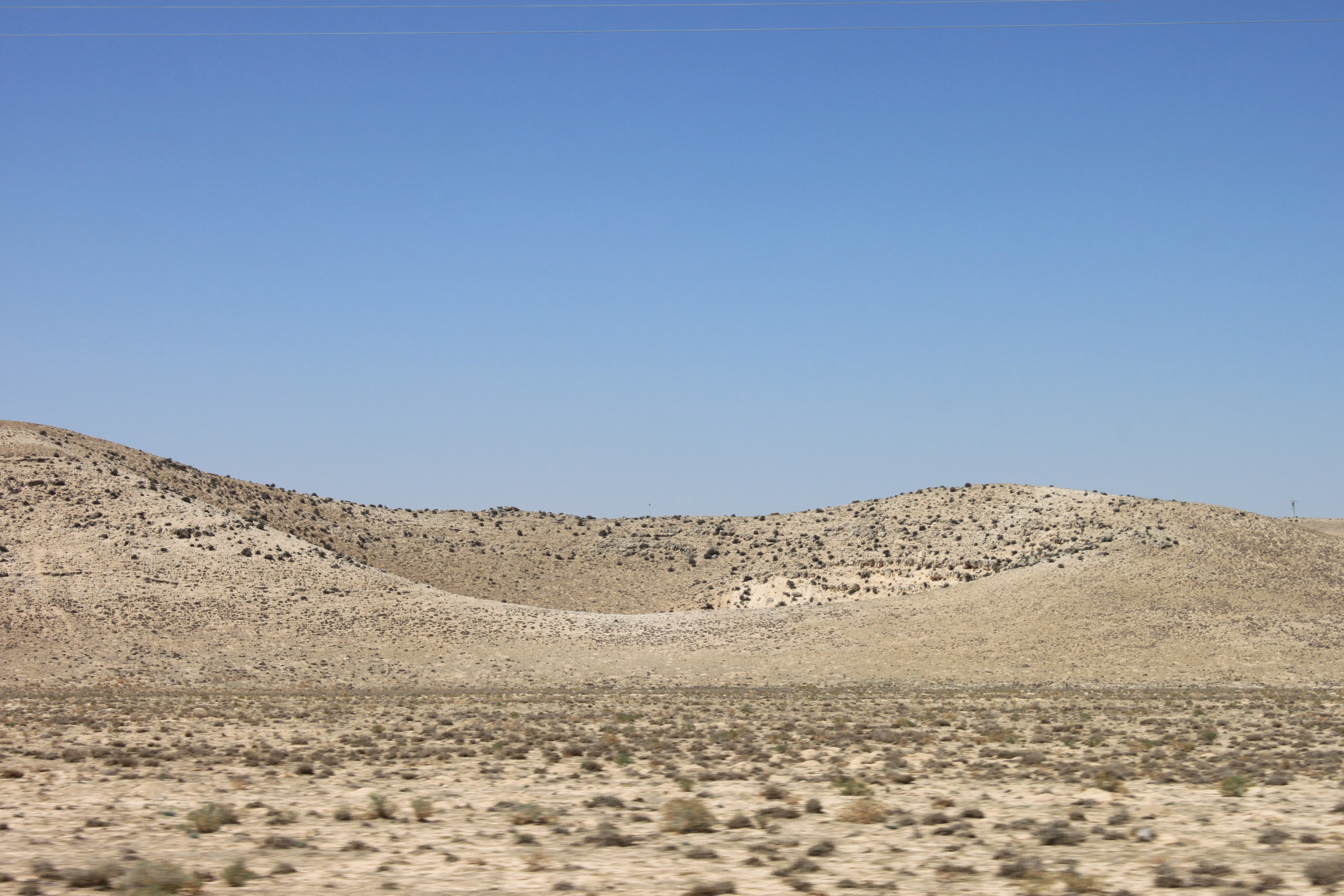
- Steppe landscape near Karapınar

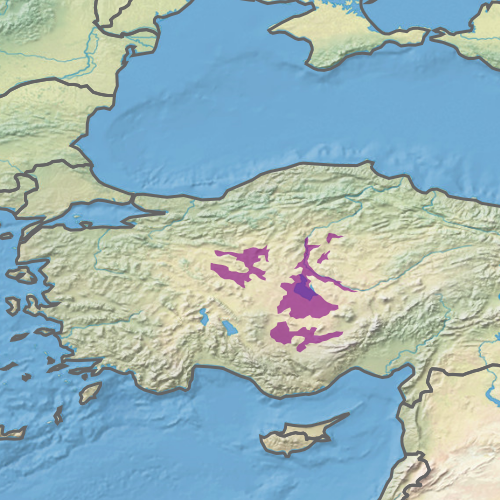
- Ecoregion territory (in purple)

Ecology
- Realm: Palearctic
- Biome: temperate grasslands, savannas, and shrublands
- Borders: Anatolian conifer and deciduous mixed forests; Central Anatolian deciduous forests; Northern Anatolian conifer and deciduous forests

Geography
- Area: 24,934 km^{2} (9,627 sq mi)
- Countries: Turkey

Conservation
- Conservation status: Vulnerable
- Protected: 1 km² (0%)

The Central Anatolian steppe is a Palearctic ecoregion in the temperate grasslands, savannas, and shrublands biome. It covers an area of 24,934 km^{2}.

== Geography ==
The Central Anatolian steppe is located in the Central Anatolia region of Turkey, where it occupies the lowest portion of the Central Anatolian plain. It consists of three separate areas, along with several smaller ones.

The largest is centered on Lake Tuz, and also includes the middle reach of the Kizilirmak River. The second area is the Karapınar and Konya Plains south of Lake Tuz. The Obruk Plateau separates the Lake Tuz basin from the Karapınar and Konya plains. The third area lies in the middle valleys of the Sakarya and Porsuk rivers northwest of Lake Tuz, as they curve around the eastern end of the Sündiken Mountains.

The ecoregion consists mostly of plains and river valleys, with an average elevation of 1,000 m. Mountains and plateaus define the edges of the ecoregion.

Lake Tuz lies in a closed basin, fed by seasonal streams descending from the surrounding plateaus. The average elevation of the lake is 829 m. In the summer months, the lake mostly dries up, exposing salt flats. During the winter months the lake refills and expands.

The steppe is mostly bounded by the Central Anatolian deciduous forests ecoregion, which occupies the plateaus and mountains of Central Anatolia. The Sündiken Mountains are part of the Anatolian conifer and deciduous mixed forests ecoregion. The Northern Anatolian conifer and deciduous forests ecoregion covers the Pontic Mountains, which enclose Central Anatolia on the north.

Some scientists suggested that characteristics of some parts of the Central Anatolian steppe could have been anthropogenic by regarding historical and botanical clues. Firstly, some tumuli that locate in this steppe now, include wooden structures that were made of Taxus, Juniperus and Cedrus. These trees were determined to be carried from areas close to the tumuli. Also Thermae could have been a factor for deforestation in the Central Anatolia because thermae have needed so many firewoods to maintain their services. Moreover, weak clusters of trees (Quercus, Pinus nigra, Pyrus pyraster) have been spotted on the hillsides in Ankara, Konya and Aksaray, so tree line in the Central Anatolia was determined on 1090-1300 m. In short, it was determined that steppe advanced against forests in the Central Anatolia while forests in this region was degraded gradually from Antiquity to present.

== Climate ==
The ecoregion has a continental climate, with hot and dry summers and cold winters. The ecoregion is semi-arid, and annual precipitation ranges from 400 to 500 mm, and as low as 300 mm in some rain shadow areas.

== Flora ==
Lake Tuz is surrounded by salt steppe, composed of salt-tolerant (halophytic) low shrubs and herbaceous plants, including many from the Chenopodiaceae and Plumbaginaceae families. The most salt-tolerant plants grow closest to the center of the lake, with less salt-tolerant plants occupying higher areas. Lake Tuz' saline steppes are home to many endemic species.

The Karapınar Plain includes areas of salt steppe around smaller saline lakes, seasonal freshwater wetlands, and upland steppes characterized by Limonium anatolicum, with Petrosimonia brachiata, Alhagi pseudoalhagi, Salsola crassa, Petrosimonia nigeensis, and Frankenia hirsuta.

== Fauna ==
The ecoregion's salt lakes and freshwater wetlands are home to large populations of water birds, including resident and breeding birds and winter migrants.

A subspecies of Asian short-toed lark (Alaudala cheleensis ssp. niethammeri), inhabits the barren fringes of the ecoregion's salt and soda lakes. Steppe bird species include the great bustard (Otis tarda) and little bustard (Tetrax tetrax).

Mammal species of the salt steppe include Williams's jerboa (Allactaga williamsi), Anatolian ground squirrel (Spermophilus xanthoprymnus), Turkish hamster (Mesocricetus brandtii), Eurasian badger (Meles meles), and marbled polecat (Vormela peregusna).
