= Eastern Anatolian deciduous forests =

Ecoregion in Eastern Anatolia, Turkey

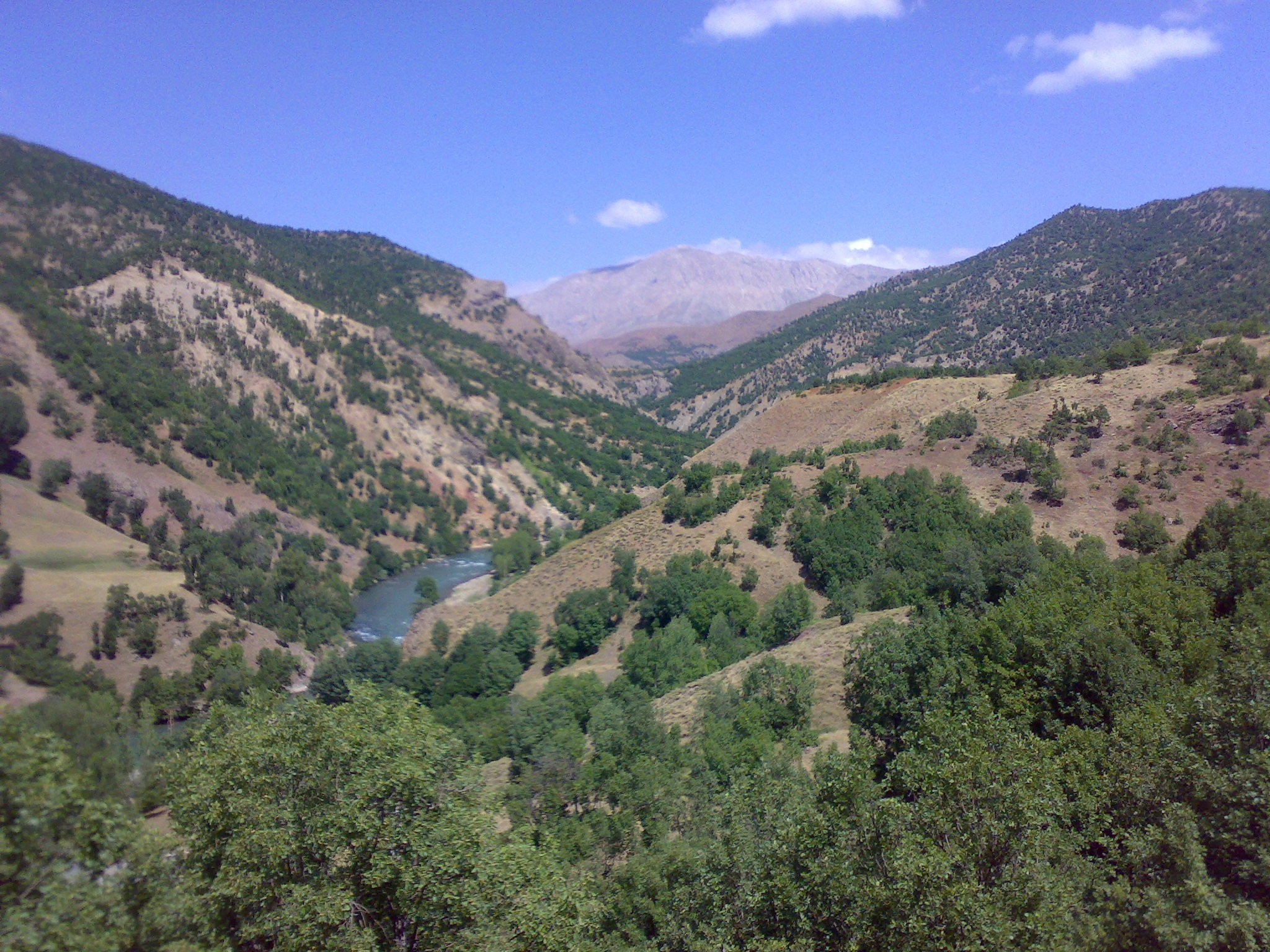
- landscape at Ovacık, Tunceli

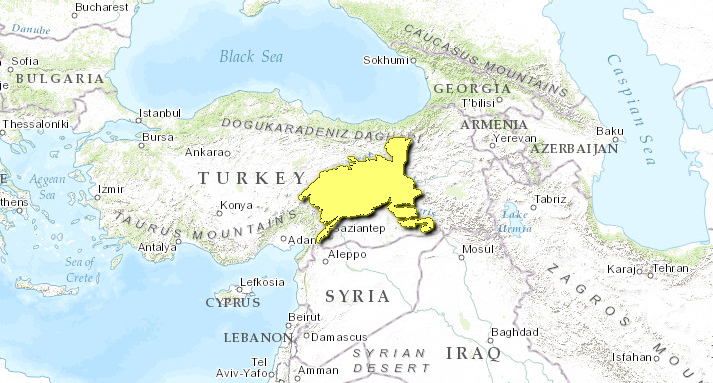
- location map of the Eastern Anatolian deciduous forests

Ecology
- Realm: Palearctic
- Biome: temperate broadleaf and mixed forests
- Borders: List: Central Anatolian deciduous forests; Eastern Anatolian montane steppe; Eastern Mediterranean conifer-broadleaf forests; Northern Anatolian conifer and deciduous forests; Southern Anatolian montane conifer and deciduous forests

Geography
- Area: 81,628 km^{2} (31,517 sq mi)
- Countries: Turkey

Conservation
- Conservation status: Vulnerable

The Eastern Anatolian deciduous forests ecoregion is located in the mountains of eastern Turkey. It is a Palearctic ecoregion in the temperate broadleaf and mixed forests biome.

== Geography ==
The ecoregion covers an area of 81,628 km^{2}, which includes the Anti-Taurus Mountains, the western part of the eastern Anatolian Mountains, and the headwaters of the Euphrates River.

The Anatolian diagonal runs through the northern and western portion of the ecoregion. The diagonal is a biogeographic feature which marks the easternmost limit of many Central Anatolian species, and the western limit of many eastern Anatolian species. 390 plant species are confined to the diagonal itself.

== Climate ==
The climate is dry and continental, with extreme winter cold and heavy snowfall. Average annual precipitation ranges from 600 to 1,000 mm. The Mediterranean climate regions of the eastern Mediterranean lie to the south and southwest. The climate of the Black Sea region to the north is more humid and moderate.

== Flora ==
Forests and woodlands are the most widespread plant communities, interspersed with steppe and shrublands. Forests typically have an open canopy and a grassy understory. The predominant trees are deciduous oaks, including Quercus brantii, Q. libani, Q. boissieri and Q. ithaburensis ssp. macrolepis. Other forest communities include Quercus robur ssp. pedunculiflora forests and montane Pinus sylvestris forests. Platanus orientalis is predominant in valley forests. Relict forest of alder (Alnus spp.), sweet chestnut (Castanea sativa), maple (Acer spp.). and the shrub Lonicera caucasica are found in humid enclaves.

Other woody plant communities include wild rose shrublands dominated by Rosa pimpinellifolia and Rosa canina, and low woodlands of dwarf juniper (Juniperus communis ssp. nana) with an understory of Convolvulus calvertii.

Areas of steppe are interspersed among the forests and woodlands, and anthropogenic steppe has expanded where woodlands and forests have been degraded or destroyed. Steppe of Artemisia fragrans is common at lower elevations. Steppe of herbs and low shrubs, including Astragalus spp., Gundelia tournefortii, Noaea mucronata, Thymus spp., and Salvia cryptantha, is found in oak forest clearings. These are known as tragacanthic steppe, after tragacanth, a natural gum derived from several species of Astragalus that grow there. High mountain steppes are predominantly of herbaceous plants, like Achillea vermicularis, Ajuga chia, Helianthemum nummularium, Strigosella africana, and Marrubium parviflorum. Other steppe types are dominated by grasses.

Quercus macranthera, Q. petraea, Q. hartwissiana, Betula pubescens var. litwinowii, Corylus avellana, Alnus glutinosa, Crataegus orientalis, C. meyeri, Prunus mahaleb, P. cocomilia, Pyrus elaeagrifolia, Malus sylvestris, Torminalis glaberrima, Hedlundia roopiana, Pistacia eurycarpa, Populus tremula, Acer platanoides, A. monspessulanum, A. tataricum, A. cappadocicum, A. hyrcanum and Elaeagnus angustifolia are among the other deciduous species found in the forests. Shrubs and small trees include Sambucus nigra, S. ebulus, Viburnum opulus, V. lantana, Rhus coriaria, Salix cinerea, Amelanchier ovalis, Aria umbellata, Colutea cilicica, Lonicera nummulariifolia and Euonymus latifolius.

== Fauna ==
Native mammals include brown bear (Ursus arctos), wolf (Canis lupus), lynx (Lynx lynx), red fox (Vulpes vulpes), chamois (Rupicapra rupicapra asiatica), bezoar ibex (Capra aegagrus), wild boar (Sus scrofa), and river otter (Lutra lutra).

Birds include the chukar partridge (Alectoris chukar) and grey partridge (Perdix perdix).

== Protected areas ==
Protected areas in the ecoregion include Munzur Valley National Park, Mount Nemrut National Park, and Şeytan Dağları National Park.
