= Anatolian conifer and deciduous mixed forests =

Ecoregion in Southwestern Anatolia, Turkey

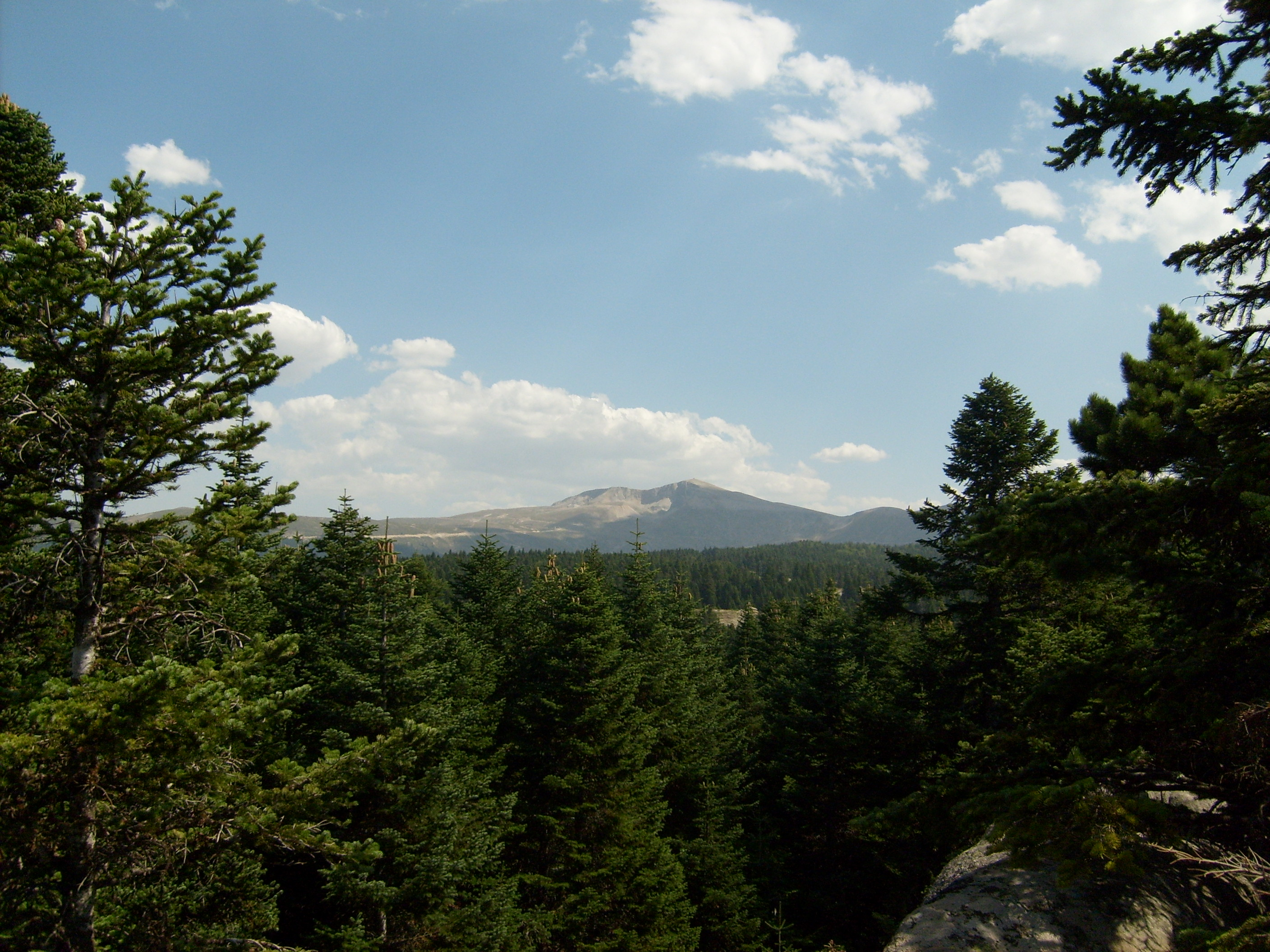
- View of Uludağ from Sarıalan

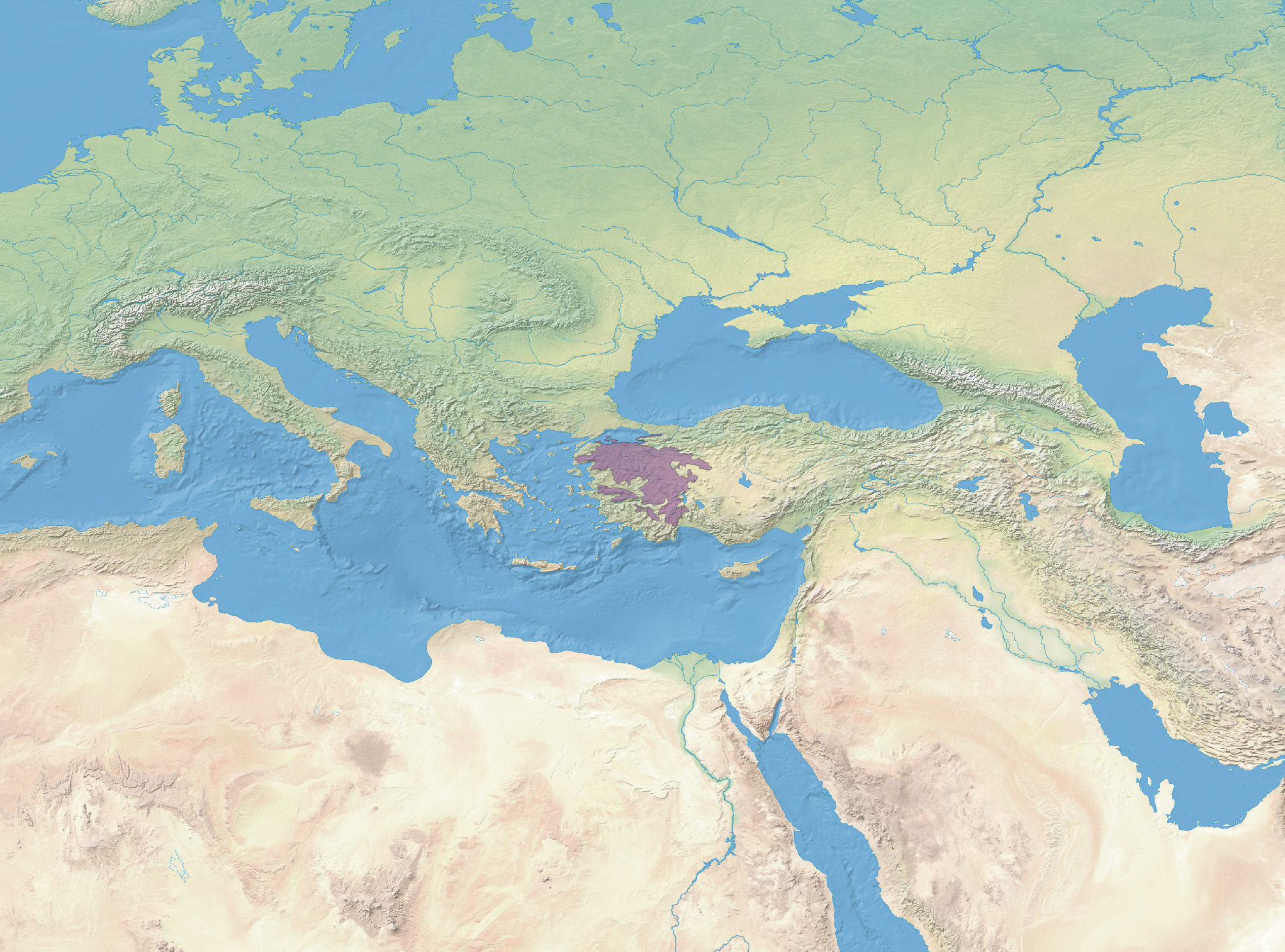
- Anatolian Conifer and Deciduous Mixed Forests highlighted in purple

Ecology
- Realm: Palearctic
- Biome: Mediterranean forests, woodlands, and scrub
- Borders: List: Aegean and Western Turkey sclerophyllous and mixed forests; Central Anatolian steppe; Central Anatolian steppe and woodlands; Euxine-Colchic broadleaf forests; Northern Anatolian conifer and deciduous forests; Southern Anatolian montane conifer and deciduous forests

Geography
- Area: 86,105 km^{2} (33,245 sq mi)
- Country: Turkey

Conservation
- Conservation status: critical/endangered
- Protected: 667 km^{2} (1%)

The Anatolian conifer and deciduous mixed forests is an ecoregion located in southwestern Anatolia, Turkey. It has a Mediterranean climate, and is part of the Mediterranean forests, woodlands, and scrub biome.

== Geography ==
The ecoregion covers the mountains and plateaus of southwestern Turkey. To the west, the Aegean and Western Turkey sclerophyllous and mixed forests ecoregion covers the foothills and coastal plains along the Aegean Sea. On the north, the Anatolian conifer and deciduous forests extend to the southern shore of the Sea of Marmara. On the northeast, the ecoregion transitions to the more humid and temperate Euxine-Colchic broadleaf forests. To the east is Central Anatolia, which has a drier and more continental climate, and home to conifer forests, dry deciduous broadleaf forests, and steppes. The Southern Anatolian montane conifer and deciduous forests occupy the Taurus Mountains in the south and southeast.

The highest peak is Uludağ (2,543 m), south of the Sea of Marmara. Kazdağı (Mount Ida) is in the northwest near the Aegean shore. The ecoregion extends to the Sündiken Mountains in the northeast, and includes the Boz Mountains and Aydin Mountains in the southwest.

The Büyük Menderes and Gediz rivers originate in the central portion of the ecoregion, and flow westwards to empty into the Aegean. The northern-central portion of the ecoregion is drained by the Simav River, which empties northwards into the Sea of Marmara. The Sakarya River and its tributaries drain the northeast. The southeastern portion of the ecoregion includes several closed basins that drain into saline or soda lakes, including Lake Burdur, Lake Acıgöl, and Lake Işıklı.

== Climate ==
The ecoregion has a Mediterranean climate, with hot dry summers and rainy winters. Average annual precipitation generally ranges from 400 to 600 mm. The climate is varies from east to west and north to south. Winters are milder and rainfall is generally higher where the climatic influence of the Mediterranean Sea is strongest, and while the eastern and northern portions of the ecoregion closer to Central Anatolia have a more continental climate, with colder winters and lower rainfall.

Example climate types for this flora region :

Climate data for Gönen (1991-2020)
| Month | Jan | Feb | Mar | Apr | May | Jun | Jul | Aug | Sep | Oct | Nov | Dec | Year |
|---|---|---|---|---|---|---|---|---|---|---|---|---|---|
| Mean daily maximum °C (°F) | 9.7 (49.5) | 11.0 (51.8) | 14.2 (57.6) | 19.0 (66.2) | 24.3 (75.7) | 29.0 (84.2) | 30.7 (87.3) | 30.7 (87.3) | 27.2 (81.0) | 21.8 (71.2) | 16.2 (61.2) | 11.3 (52.3) | 20.4 (68.8) |
| Daily mean °C (°F) | 5.3 (41.5) | 6.2 (43.2) | 8.7 (47.7) | 12.5 (54.5) | 17.5 (63.5) | 22.2 (72.0) | 24.5 (76.1) | 24.5 (76.1) | 20.4 (68.7) | 15.8 (60.4) | 10.8 (51.4) | 7.0 (44.6) | 14.6 (58.3) |
| Mean daily minimum °C (°F) | 1.6 (34.9) | 2.2 (36.0) | 3.9 (39.0) | 6.6 (43.9) | 11.0 (51.8) | 15.3 (59.5) | 18.0 (64.4) | 18.6 (65.5) | 14.4 (57.9) | 10.9 (51.6) | 6.4 (43.5) | 3.6 (38.5) | 9.4 (48.9) |
| Average precipitation mm (inches) | 86.3 (3.40) | 84.3 (3.32) | 68.3 (2.69) | 55.2 (2.17) | 39.5 (1.56) | 31.0 (1.22) | 11.0 (0.43) | 13.6 (0.54) | 43.1 (1.70) | 73.7 (2.90) | 76.2 (3.00) | 100.0 (3.94) | 682.2 (26.87) |
| Average precipitation days (≥ 1.0 mm) | 8.9 | 9.1 | 8.1 | 7.2 | 5.2 | 3.7 | 1.9 | 2.1 | 4.3 | 6.6 | 6.9 | 10.6 | 74.6 |
| Average relative humidity (%) | 82.8 | 79.9 | 76.1 | 74.1 | 72.3 | 67.5 | 66.3 | 68.5 | 71.8 | 79.2 | 82 | 83.5 | 75.3 |
Source: NOAA NCEI

Climate data for Bursa (1991–2020, extremes 1928–2023)
| Month | Jan | Feb | Mar | Apr | May | Jun | Jul | Aug | Sep | Oct | Nov | Dec | Year |
|---|---|---|---|---|---|---|---|---|---|---|---|---|---|
| Record high °C (°F) | 25.2 (77.4) | 26.9 (80.4) | 32.5 (90.5) | 36.2 (97.2) | 37.0 (98.6) | 41.3 (106.3) | 43.8 (110.8) | 42.6 (108.7) | 40.3 (104.5) | 37.3 (99.1) | 32.1 (89.8) | 27.3 (81.1) | 43.8 (110.8) |
| Mean daily maximum °C (°F) | 9.8 (49.6) | 11.4 (52.5) | 14.6 (58.3) | 19.2 (66.6) | 24.4 (75.9) | 28.9 (84.0) | 31.5 (88.7) | 31.7 (89.1) | 27.6 (81.7) | 22.2 (72.0) | 16.6 (61.9) | 11.5 (52.7) | 20.8 (69.4) |
| Daily mean °C (°F) | 5.4 (41.7) | 6.5 (43.7) | 9.0 (48.2) | 13.0 (55.4) | 18.1 (64.6) | 22.6 (72.7) | 25.1 (77.2) | 25.2 (77.4) | 20.8 (69.4) | 15.9 (60.6) | 10.7 (51.3) | 7.0 (44.6) | 14.9 (58.8) |
| Mean daily minimum °C (°F) | 1.7 (35.1) | 2.4 (36.3) | 4.1 (39.4) | 7.4 (45.3) | 12.0 (53.6) | 16.2 (61.2) | 18.4 (65.1) | 18.7 (65.7) | 14.8 (58.6) | 10.8 (51.4) | 6.0 (42.8) | 3.3 (37.9) | 9.6 (49.3) |
| Record low °C (°F) | −20.5 (−4.9) | −19.6 (−3.3) | −10.5 (13.1) | −4.2 (24.4) | 0.8 (33.4) | 4.0 (39.2) | 8.3 (46.9) | 7.6 (45.7) | 3.3 (37.9) | −1.0 (30.2) | −8.4 (16.9) | −17.9 (−0.2) | −20.5 (−4.9) |
| Average precipitation mm (inches) | 79.2 (3.12) | 78.2 (3.08) | 74.9 (2.95) | 68.6 (2.70) | 47.9 (1.89) | 42.8 (1.69) | 14.3 (0.56) | 17.5 (0.69) | 50.1 (1.97) | 84.4 (3.32) | 67.3 (2.65) | 93.9 (3.70) | 719.1 (28.31) |
| Average precipitation days | 14.87 | 13.60 | 13.40 | 11.43 | 9.63 | 7.30 | 3.33 | 3.60 | 6.77 | 10.67 | 10.93 | 14.53 | 119.8 |
| Average snowy days | 5.08 | 3.71 | 1.46 | 0.08 | 0 | 0 | 0 | 0 | 0 | 0.04 | 0.42 | 2.42 | 13.21 |
| Average relative humidity (%) | 75.3 | 72.8 | 70.7 | 69.3 | 67.1 | 63.1 | 59.6 | 61.7 | 67.3 | 74.6 | 75.5 | 75.7 | 69.4 |
| Mean monthly sunshine hours | 83.7 | 90.4 | 124.0 | 165.0 | 217.0 | 264.0 | 300.7 | 275.9 | 217.0 | 145.7 | 111.0 | 77.5 | 2,071.9 |
| Mean daily sunshine hours | 2.7 | 3.2 | 4.0 | 5.5 | 7.0 | 8.8 | 9.7 | 8.9 | 7.0 | 4.7 | 3.7 | 2.5 | 5.6 |
Source 1: Turkish State Meteorological Service
Source 2: NOAA (humidity), Meteomanz

== Flora ==
The predominant plant communities in the ecoregion are forests of pines and deciduous broadleaf trees, chiefly oaks.

Forests of Turkish pine (Pinus brutia) occur in the western foothills and inland depressions. Turkish pine is a characteristic tree of Western Turkey's lowland Mediterranean forests. Pinus brutia forests include the oaks Quercus cerris, Q. ithaburensis ssp. macrolepis, and Q. coccifera.

Anatolian black pine (P. nigra ssp. pallasiana) is more widespread, particularly in the drier east and above 1000 meters elevation. Pure stands are common above 1000 meters elevation, and sparse forests of Anatolian black pine and juniper are found at high elevations near the treeline. Below 1000 meters elevation, Anatolian black pine occurs in mixed forests with P. brutia, Quercus spp., and Juniperus spp. In the eastern mountains around 1000 meters elevation, mixed stands of P. nigra, Quercus cerris, Q. pubescens, and Q. robur subsp. robur also include many typical Anatolian steppe plants, like Pyrus elaeagrifolia, Prunus spinosa, Crateagus spp., and shrubs and herbaceous plants.

Oaks occur in pine forests, and as the dominant tree in some areas. Quercus cerris is the most widespread of the oaks. Other oaks are Q. pubescens, especially in steppe edges and on degraded sites, and Q. ithaburensis subsp. macrolepis, Q. trojana, Q. robur subsp. robur, and Q. frainetto.

In humid areas, particularly along streams and in the mountains south of the Sea of Marmara, oaks form mixed forests with other deciduous trees, including oriental hornbeam (Carpinus orientalis), sweet chestnut (Castanea sativa), Juglans regia, and oriental beech (Fagus orientalis), along with the Turkish fir (Abies bornmuelleriana or Abies nordmanniana subsp. bornnmuelleriana) on Uludağ. The Trojan fir (Abies equi-trojani or Abies nordmanniana subsp. equi-trojani) is endemic to Kaz Dağı (Mount Ida), where it covers 282.5 ha in pure stands, and 3309 ha mixed with Anatolian black pine and Oriental beech.

== Fauna ==
Brown bear (Ursus arctos) and grey wolf (Canis lupus) are found around Uludağ. Roe deer (Capreolus capreolus) are more widespread.

== Protected areas ==
Protected areas in the ecoregion include Manyas Bird Paradise National Park, Uludağ National Park, Kazdağı National Park, Troy Historical National Park, Gürgendağı Nature Reserve, Vakıf Çamlığı Nature Reserve, and Dandindere Nature Reserve.

Kazdağı National Park and Gürgendağ Nature Reserve are located on Kazdağı (Mount Ida) in the northwest. The national park is home to 800 plant species, 68 of which are endemic to Turkey and 31 of which are endemic to the mountain.
