= Eastern Mediterranean conifer–sclerophyllous–broadleaf forests =

Ecoregion in the Eastern Mediterranean Basin

Eastern Mediterranean conifer-sclerophyllous-broadleaf forests
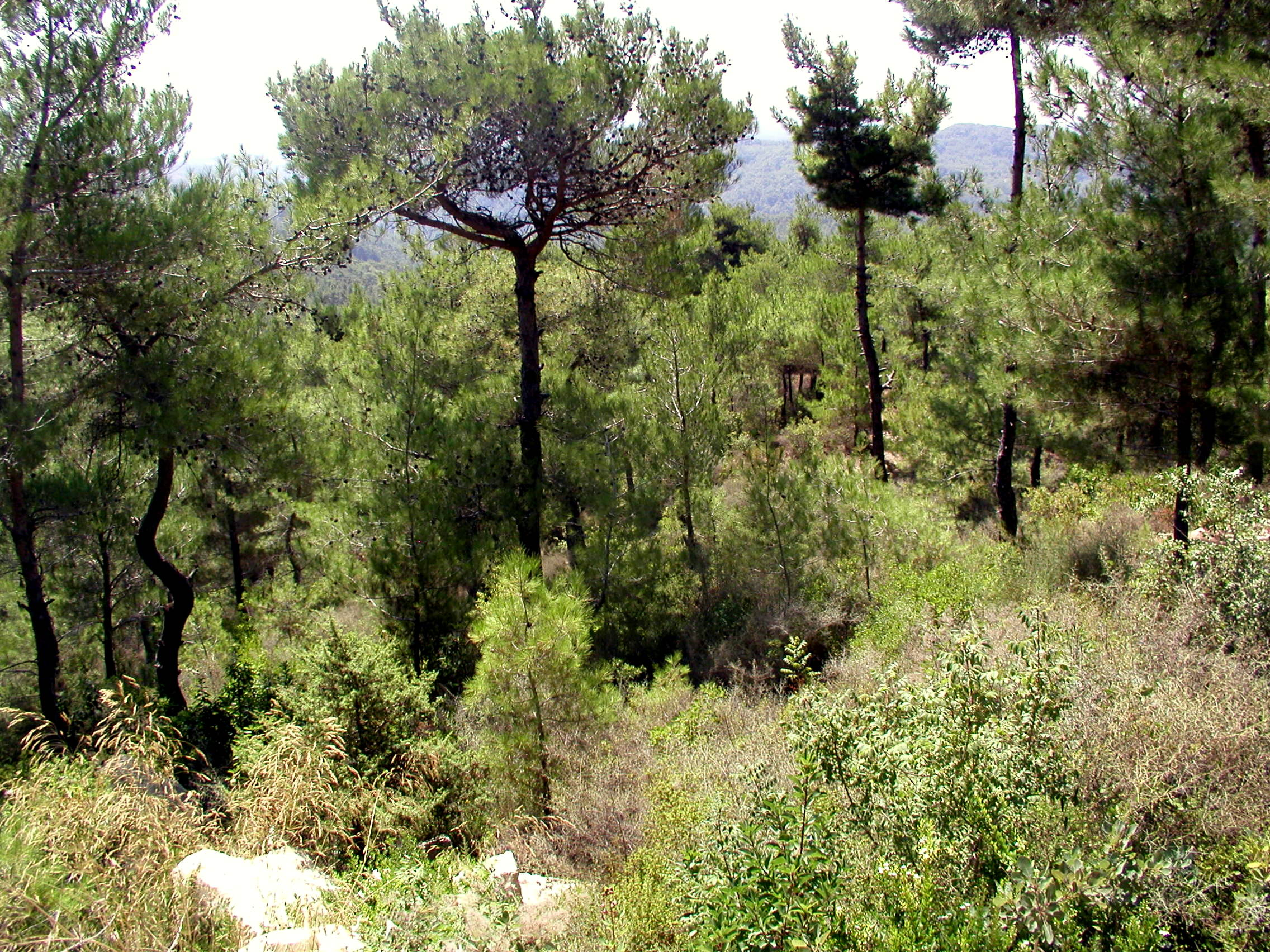
- Turkish pines (Pinus brutia) near Kessab, Syria

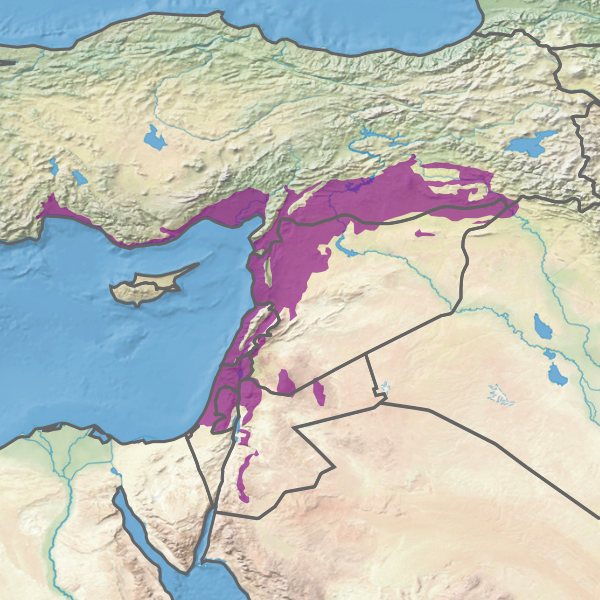
- Ecoregion territory (in purple)

Ecology
- Realm: Palearctic
- Biome: Mediterranean forests, woodlands, and scrub
- Borders: List: Arabian desert; Eastern Anatolian deciduous forests; Mesopotamian shrub desert; Red Sea-Arabian desert shrublands; Southern Anatolian montane conifer and deciduous forests; Syrian xeric grasslands and shrublands; Zagros Mountains forest steppe

Geography
- Area: 142,284 km^{2} (54,936 mi^{2})
- Countries: List: Iraq; Israel; Jordan; Lebanon; Palestine; Saudi Arabia; Syria; Turkey

Conservation
- Conservation status: Critical/endangered
- Protected: 1,147 km² (1%)

The Eastern Mediterranean conifer-sclerophyllous-forests, also known as the Eastern Mediterranean conifer-forests, is an ecoregion in the eastern Mediterranean Basin. It covers portions of Turkey, Syria, Iraq, Lebanon, Israel, Palestine, Jordan, and Saudi Arabia (Asir and Al-Bahah).

The ecoregion has a Mediterranean climate, and is part of the Mediterranean forests, woodlands, and scrub biome.

== Geography ==
The ecoregion covers an area of 143,800 square kilometers (55,500 sq mi). In southern Turkey, it occupies the coastal lowlands between the mountains and the Mediterranean, extending from Antalya to Iskenderun and including the Çukurova plain in between. It then extends eastwards through southern Turkey to where the borders of Iraq, Syria, and Turkey meet, and southwards along the eastern Mediterranean through the Levant – western Syria, Israel, Palestine, Lebanon, and the Jordanian Highlands. The Druze Mountains in central Syria are an outlier. Isolated mountaintop pockets (Jabal al-Lawz, etc.) are found in the Midian Mountains, and Hijaz and sarawat Mountains of western Saudi Arabia.

The ecoregion is bounded by forest ecoregions to the north in Anatolia, and deserts to the east and south. The ecoregion covers coastal plains, low mountains, and interior plateaus. The higher elevations in the Taurus Mountains to the north, and the Syrian Coastal Mountains, Lebanon Mountains, and Anti-Lebanon Mountains which run parallel to the Eastern Mediterranean coast, are in the Southern Anatolian montane conifer and deciduous forests ecoregion.

Several large cities are in the ecoregion, including Adana, Gaziantep, Antalya, and Mersin in Turkey; Aleppo, Homs, Hama, and Latakia in Syria; Beirut and Tripoli in Lebanon; Tel Aviv, Jerusalem (i.e. Judean Hills), and Haifa in Israel; Hebron and Nablus in Palestine; and Amman in Jordan, taif and albaha in Saudi Arabia

== Climate ==
The ecoregion has a Mediterranean climate, with a mild, rainy winter and hot dry summer. Rainfall varies across the ecoregion. It is generally higher on coastal-facing slopes, ranging from 1,000-1,250 mm annually near Antalya to 650-850 mm in Mersin, Adana, Iskendurun, and coastal Syria and Lebanon. Rainfall is lowest in the eastern and southernmost parts of the ecoregion, with less than 450 mm annually in eastern Anatolia, the interior of Syria, southern Israel and Palestine, and the Jordanian Highlands. and in Saudi Arabia features a dual weather system with summers receiving monsoon rain with significant inter-annual variation with some years receiving little to none.

== Flora ==
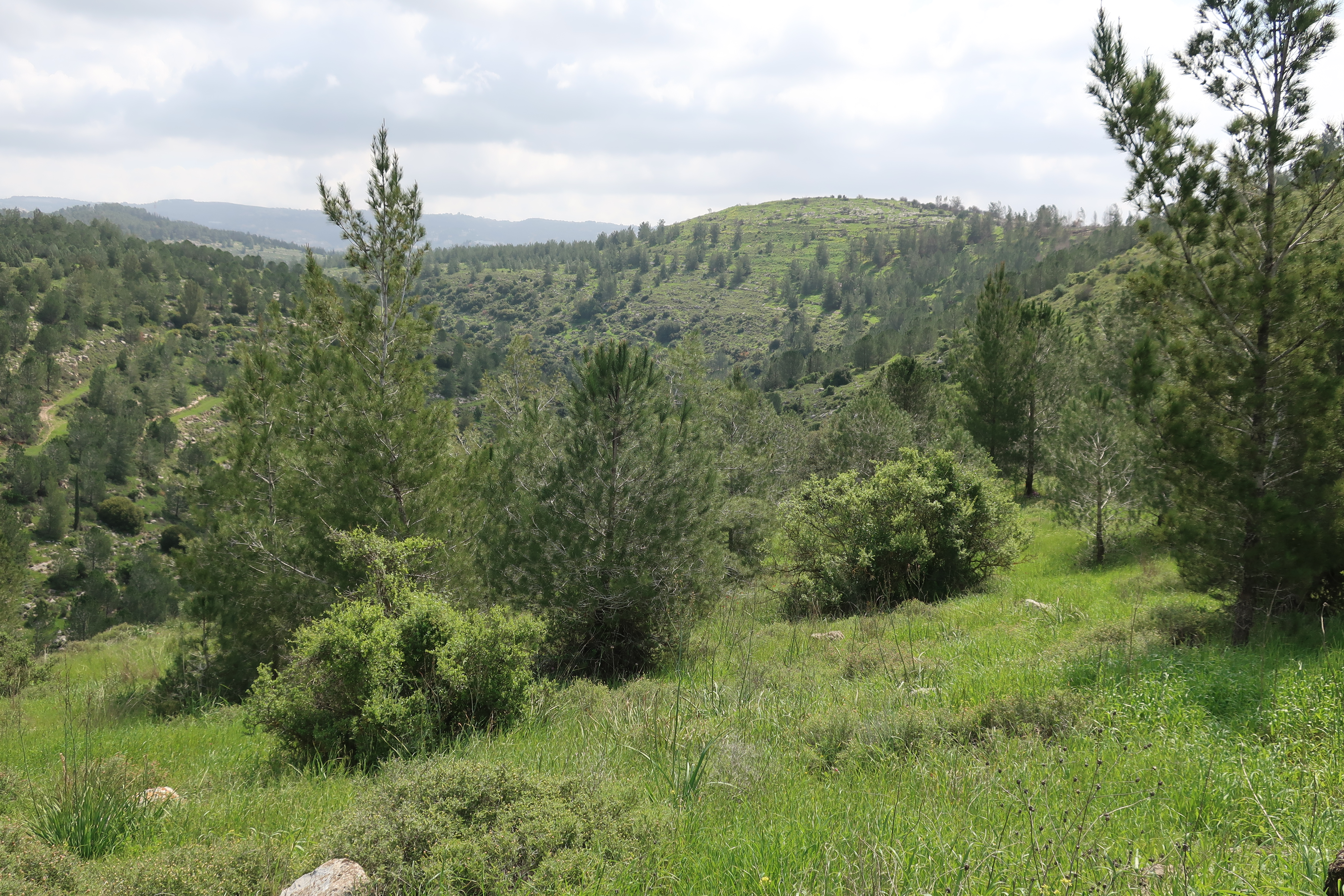
Spring in the Judean Mountains, Israel

Major plant communities in the ecoregion include broadleaf sclerophyllous shrublands (maquis and garrigue), pine forests (chiefly of Turkish pine (Pinus brutia) and Aleppo pine (Pinus halepensis)), and dry oak (Quercus spp.) woodlands and steppes.

Turkish pine is more common in the Turkish coastal region, and Aleppo pine in the Levant. Neither pine is found naturally in the eastern Mesopotamian part of the ecoregion.

Maquis is found on coastal slopes in southern Anatolia and along the Levantine coast. Maquis is an open-canopied evergreen woodland, with an understory of shrubs, herbs, grasses, and geophytes. The predominant trees are olive (Olea europaea), carob (Ceratonia siliqua), Palestine oak (Quercus calliprinos, sometimes classified as Q. coccifera subsp. calliprinos), pistachio (Pistacia terebinthus, sometimes classified as P. palaestina), lentisk (P. lentiscus), and Arbutus andrachne. Much of the maquis has been degraded by frequent fires and overgrazing.

The Judean Mountains lie within this ecoregion, which is characterised by sclerophyllous broadleaf vegetation (maquis) and mixed forests. The eastern and southernmost portions of the ecoregion are mostly low shrubland and grassland with a semi-desert character.

== Fauna ==
The golden jackal (Canis aureus) has become the top predator in most of the ecoregion. The caracal (Caracal caracal) can be found in the shrublands and mountains, and wild boar (Sus scrofa) in woodlands and forests. The eastern portion of the ecoregion has scattered populations of striped hyaena (Hyaena hyaena) and vulnerable Arabian goitered gazelle (Gazella subgutturosa). Also scattered are populations of the European badger (Meles meles) and the dorcas gazelle (Gazella dorcas).

The large predators lion (Panthera leo), Syrian brown bear (Ursus arctos syriacus), Arabian wolf (Canis lupus), and cheetah (Acinonyx jubatus) have been mostly or completely extirpated from over-hunting and habitat loss.

== Protected areas ==
A 2017 assessment found that 1,147 km², or less than 1%, of the ecoregion is in protected areas. Another 1% of the ecoregion had relatively intact habitat but is outside protected areas.

Some protected areas include:

- Mount Carmel National Park in Israel
- Mount Meron Nature Reserve in Israel (80.96 km²)
- Yumurtalık Lagoon Nature Reserve in Turkey (198.53 km²)

== See also ==
- Southwest Iberian Mediterranean sclerophyllous and mixed forests
- Mediterranean acacia–argania dry woodlands
- Southeastern Iberian shrubs and woodlands
