= Central Anatolian deciduous forests =

Ecoregion in Central Anatolia, Turkey

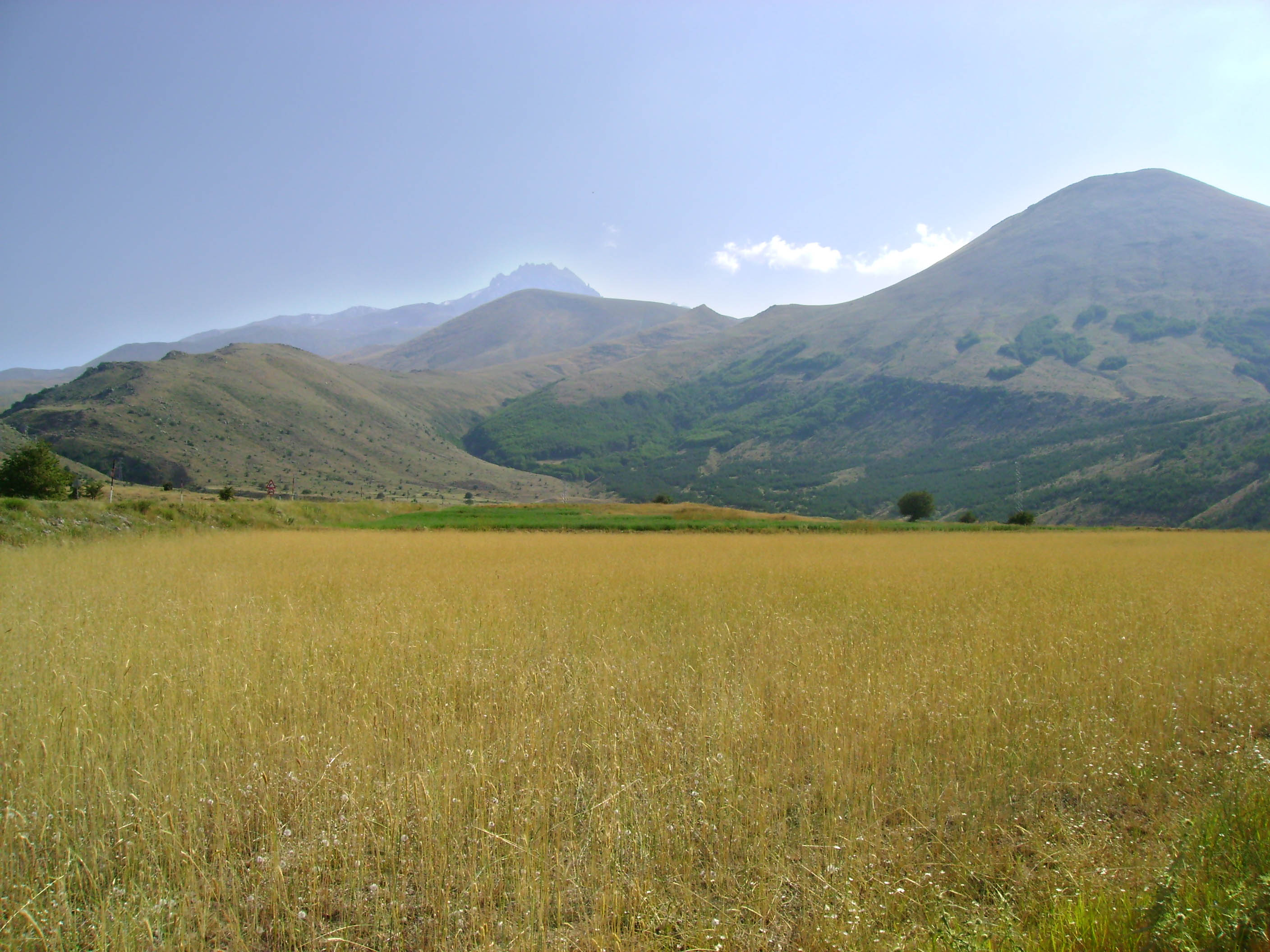
- Mount Erciyes, in Turkey

- location map of the Central Anatolian deciduous forests

Ecology
- Realm: Palearctic
- Biome: temperate broadleaf and mixed forests
- Borders: List: Anatolian conifer and deciduous mixed forests; Central Anatolian steppe; Eastern Anatolian deciduous forests; Northern Anatolian conifer and deciduous forests; Southern Anatolian montane conifer and deciduous forests

Geography
- Area: 101,493 km^{2} (39,187 sq mi)
- Countries: Turkey

Conservation
- Conservation status: Vulnerable
- Protected: 382 km^{2} (>1%)

The Central Anatolian deciduous forests, also known as the Central Anatolian woodlands and steppe, is a Palearctic ecoregion of the Temperate broadleaf and mixed forest biome. It is located in Central Anatolia, Asian Turkey.

== Geography ==
The ecoregion occupies the plateau of Central Anatolia. Belts of forested mountains surround the ecoregion, with the Mediterranean-climate Anatolian conifer and deciduous mixed forests and Southern Anatolian montane conifer and deciduous forests ecoregions in western and southern mountains, and the more temperate-climate Northern Anatolian conifer and deciduous forests in the ranges to the north. The eastern edge of the ecoregion approximates the Anatolian diagonal, a biogeographic boundary which separates central from eastern Anatolia. The diagonal forms the western edge of the adjacent Eastern Anatolian deciduous forests ecoregion.

The driest portions of the plateau, including the area around Lake Tuz, are part of the distinct Central Anatolian steppe ecoregion.

The northern part of the ecoregion is drained by the Sakarya and Kızılırmak rivers. The southern portion occupies several closed lake basins, including Lake Tuz.

Ankara, Turkey's capital, lies in the northern portion of the ecoregion. Other cities in the ecoregion are Konya, Kayseri, Karaman, and Sivas.

== Climate ==
The climate of the ecoregion is continental, with hot summers and cold winters. Rainfall ranges annual rainfall ranges from 400 to 600 mm.

== Flora ==
The characteristic vegetation of the ecoregion is dry deciduous forest interspersed with areas of shrub steppe. Human activity has transformed most of the region into anthropogenic steppe or open woodland. The forests which once covered 50 to 55% of the region now cover less than 10%. Oaks, including Quercus pubescens and Quercus infectoria, are the predominant trees. At higher elevations, Q. pubescens is joined by Pinus nigra, Juniperus oxycedrus, and Juniperus excelsa. The steppe plants include herbs, grasses, and low shrubs, with species of Artemisia, Bromus, Achillea, Trifolium, and Astragalus prominent.

Trees are absent from areas with less than 400 mm of annual rainfall. These areas constitute the 'true steppe' of the Central Anatolian steppe ecoregion.

== Protected areas ==
Protected areas include Bozdağ National Park and Sultan Sazlığı National Park.
