= Southern Anatolian montane conifer and deciduous forests =

Ecoregion in Southern Anatolia, Turkey

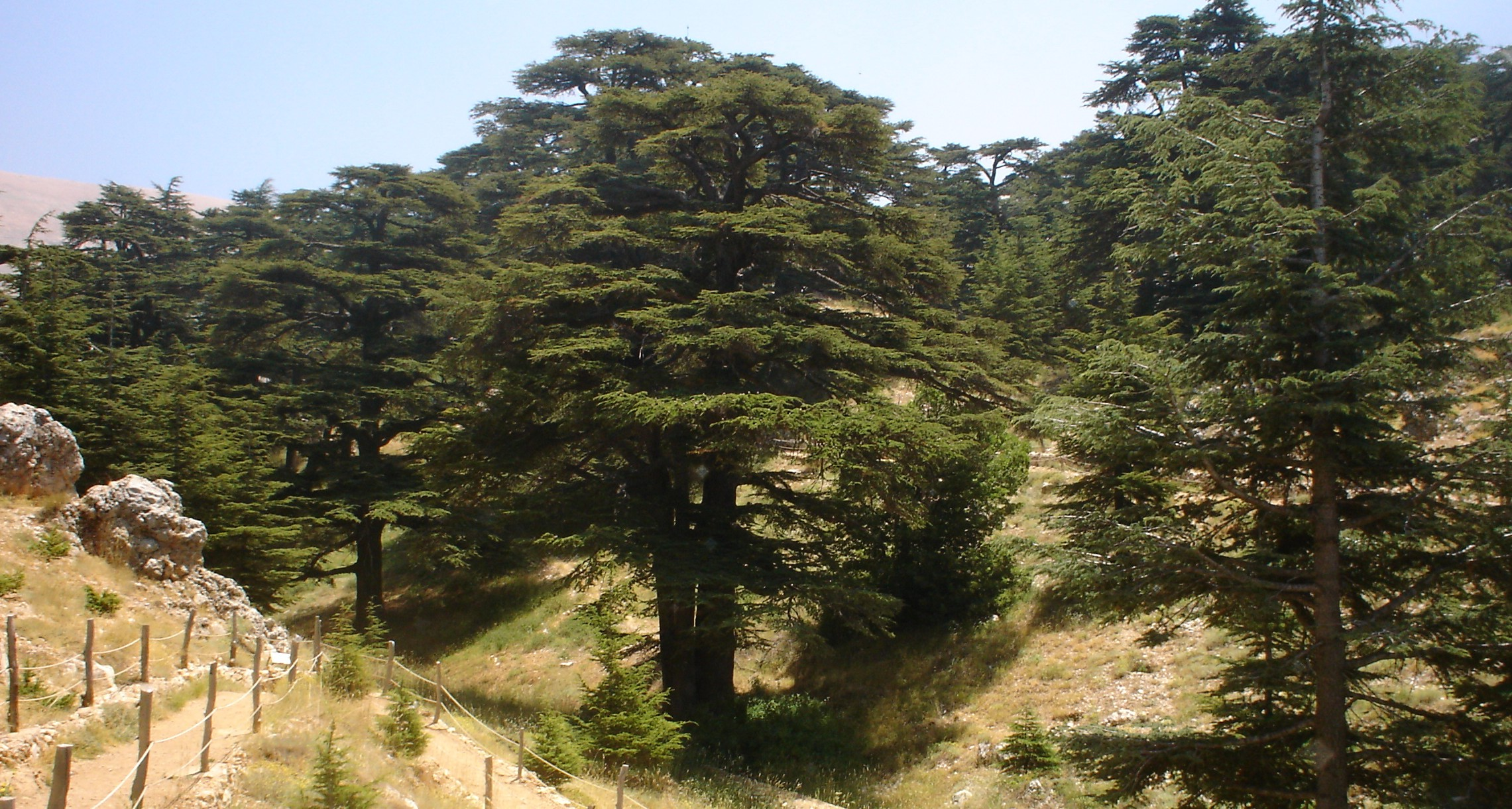
- Lebanon cedars (Cedrus libani) near El-Arz, Bsharri, Lebanon

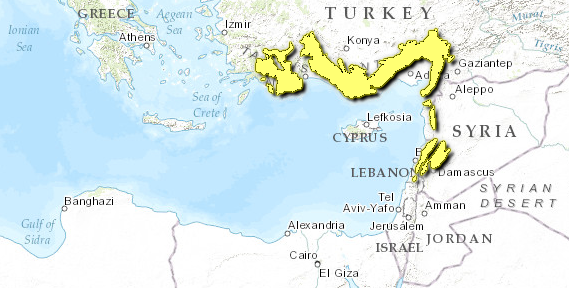
- Map of the ecoregion

Ecology
- Realm: Palearctic
- Biome: Mediterranean forests, woodlands, and scrub
- Borders: List: Aegean and Western Turkey sclerophyllous and mixed forests; Anatolian conifer and deciduous mixed forests; Central Anatolian deciduous forests; Eastern Anatolian deciduous forests; Eastern Mediterranean conifer-sclerophyllous-broadleaf forests

Geography
- Area: 76,408 km^{2} (29,501 mi^{2})
- Countries: Israel; Lebanon; Syria; Turkey

Conservation
- Conservation status: Critical/endangered
- Protected: 216 km^{2} (>1%)

The Southern Anatolian montane conifer and deciduous forests ecoregion, in the Mediterranean forests, woodlands, and scrub biome, is in the eastern Mediterranean Basin.

Lebanon cedar (Cedrus libani) is a characteristic tree.

== Geography ==
The ecoregion covers an area of 29,500 square miles (76,000 km^{2}), in portions of Turkey, Syria, Lebanon, and Israel.

The ecoregion lies mainly in the Taurus Mountains, which run through southern Anatolia roughly parallel to the coast. The Taurus is divided into three sub-ranges – the Western, or Isaurian, Taurus (highest peak Mt. Kizlarsivrisi 3,086 m (10,125 ft)); the Central, or Lycian, Taurus (highest peak Medetsiz 3,524 m (11,562 ft)); and the Eastern, or Cilician, Taurus (highest peak Demirkazık 3,756 m (12,323 ft)).

The ecoregion also includes the higher-elevation portions of the Nur Mountains (or Amanos) along the western Turkey-Syria border, and the Levantine Syrian Coastal Mountains, Lebanon Mountains, and Anti-Lebanon Mountains, which run parallel to the eastern Mediterranean shore in Syria, Lebanon, and northernmost Israel. The highest peak in the Nur mountains is Bozdağ (2,262 m (7,421 ft)), and the highest peak in the Levantine mountains is Qurnat as Sawda' in Lebanon (3,088 m (10,131 ft)).

Limestone is the most common rock, with areas of serpentinite and other ophiolitic rocks.

Temperate-climate forests and steppes lie to the north on the Anatolian plateaus. The Mediterranean-climate Eastern Mediterranean conifer-sclerophyllous-broadleaf forests ecoregion lies along the Mediterranean coastal lowlands, in the Levantine lowlands and foothills, and to the east.

== Climate ==
The ecoregion has a montane Mediterranean climate. Average annual precipitation ranges from 800 to 2000 mm. Winter is the wettest season, and summer is the driest. Rain-bearing winds generally come from the southwest winds, and south and west-facing slopes generally have higher rainfall than north and east-facing ones. Average temperatures vary with elevation, and higher elevations experience cool temperatures and regular winter frosts and snows. Proximity to the sea moderates winter temperatures, and interior regions have a more continental climate with colder winters.

== Flora ==
The main plant communities are conifer forests, broadleaf deciduous forests, and alpine meadows and shrublands.

Conifer forests are the most widespread. Turkish black pine (Pinus nigra), Lebanon cedar (Cedrus libani), Taurus fir (Abies cilicica), and juniper (Juniperus foetidissima and Juniperus excelsa) are the most common conifers. Junipers grow close to the treeline, which is at approximately 2000 meters elevation near the coast, and 2400 meters elevation in drier inland areas.

Deciduous forests are concentrated in areas with higher rainfall (1,500-2,000 mm) facing the prevailing southwest winds, notably the Geyik Mountains in the Western Taurus and the Nur Mountains in the east. Deciduous broadleaf trees are predominant, including Oriental hornbeam (Carpinus orientalis), European hop-hornbeam (Ostrya carpinifolia), oaks (Quercus cerris, Q. libani, Q. trojana, and Q. petraea ssp. pinnatiloba), and maples (Acer hyrcanum, A. platanoides, A. campestre, and A. monspessulanum).

The dry alpine meadows are characterized by low-growing subshrubs, tufted herbaceous plants, grasses, and geophytes, including many species of Astragalus.

== Protected areas ==
Protected areas in the Western Taurus include Çığlıkara Nature Reserve, near Elmalı, Antalya Province, which protects 15,889 ha of Cedrus libani forest. The protected area around the coastal mountain of Babadağ, near Fethiye in Muğla Province, includes montane forests of Acer undulatum, which is endemic to the mountain, along with Cedrus libani, Abies cilicica, Pinus brutia, and junipers, and maquis at lower elevations. Other protected areas in the Western Taurus include Sarıkara National Park in the Bey Mountains, Köprülü Canyon National Park on the Köprüçay River, and Üzümdere National Park, Altınbeşik Cave National Park, and Dim Çayı National Park in the mountains above Alanya.

Protected areas in the Central Taurus include Cehennem Deresi National Park and Topaşir National Park.
