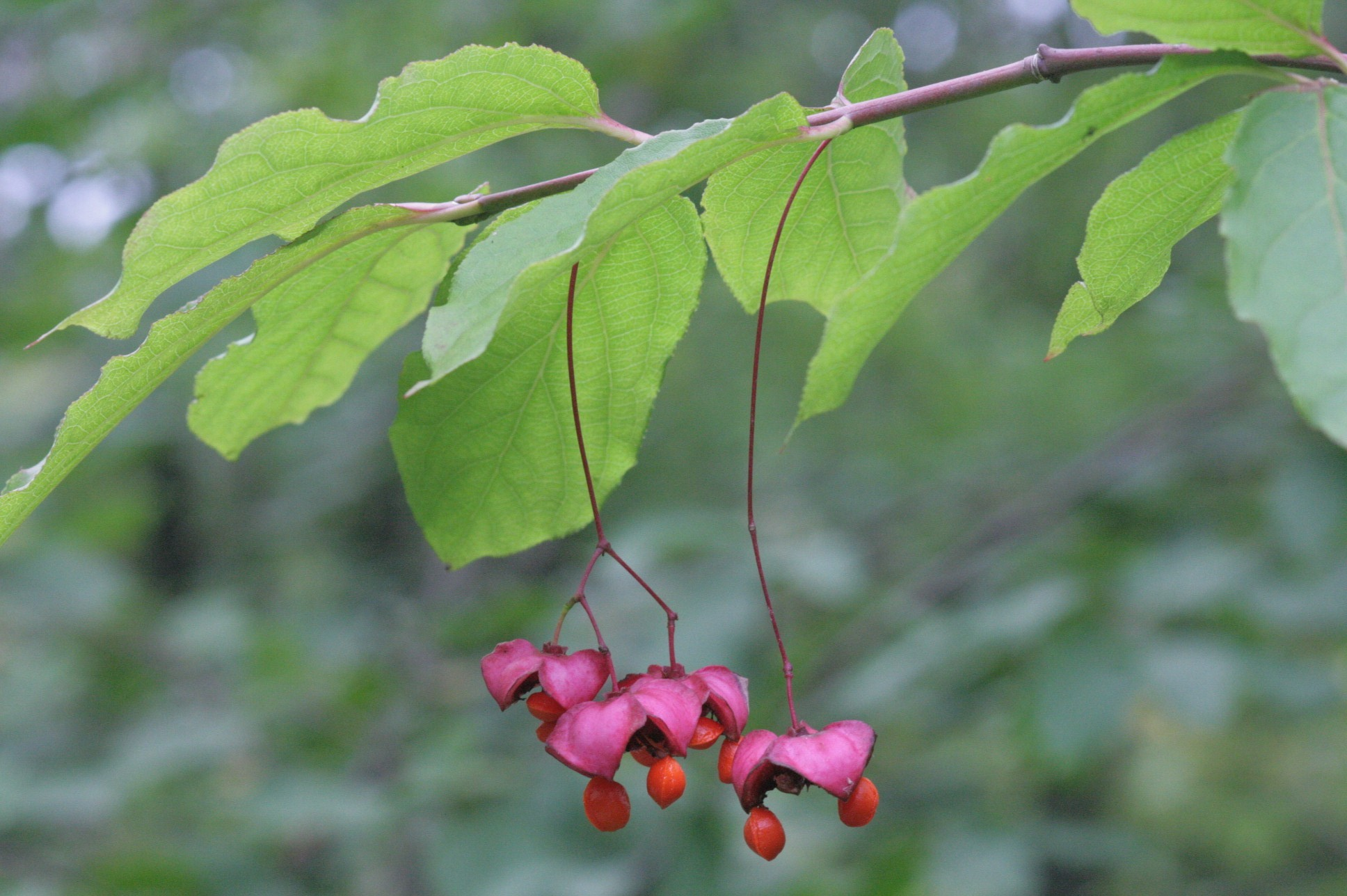
- Leaves and fruit
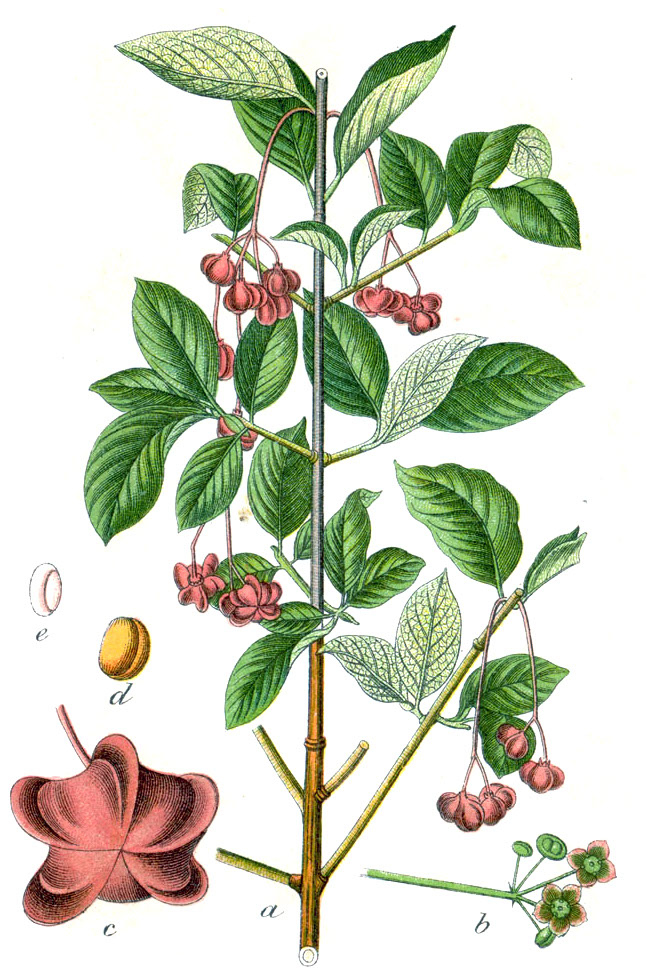
- Botanical illustration

Conservation status
- Least Concern (IUCN 3.1)

Scientific classification
- Kingdom: Plantae
- Clade: Tracheophytes
- Clade: Angiosperms
- Clade: Eudicots
- Clade: Rosids
- Order: Celastrales
- Family: Celastraceae
- Genus: Euonymus
- Species: E. latifolius

Binomial name
- Euonymus latifolius (L.) Mill.

Synonyms
- List: Euonymus europaeus var. latifolius L.; Euonymus europaeus subsp. latifolius (L.) Bonnier & Layens; Euonymus latifolius var. eximius Beck; Euonymus latifolius var. grandiflorus Rouy; Euonymus latifolius var. grandifolius Rouy & Foucaud; Euonymus latifolius var. kabilicus Debeaux; Euonymus latifolius var. parvifolius Rouy & Foucaud; Kalonymus latifolia (L.) Prokh.

= Euonymus latifolius =

Species of plant

Euonymus latifolius, the broad-leaved spindle tree, is a species of flowering plant in the family Celastraceae. It is native to the Mediterranean region, south-central Europe, the Caucasus, and the Middle East as far as Iran, and it has been introduced to Ireland, Great Britain, and Belgium. A shrub with a rounded growth form reaching 2.5 to 4 m (8 to 13 ft), it is typically found in shrublands, and in rocky habitats such as inland cliffs and mountain peaks. In the wild, it requires shade; too much sunlight can prove lethal. A low maintenance choice for a number of landscaping and garden applications, it is available from commercial nurseries.

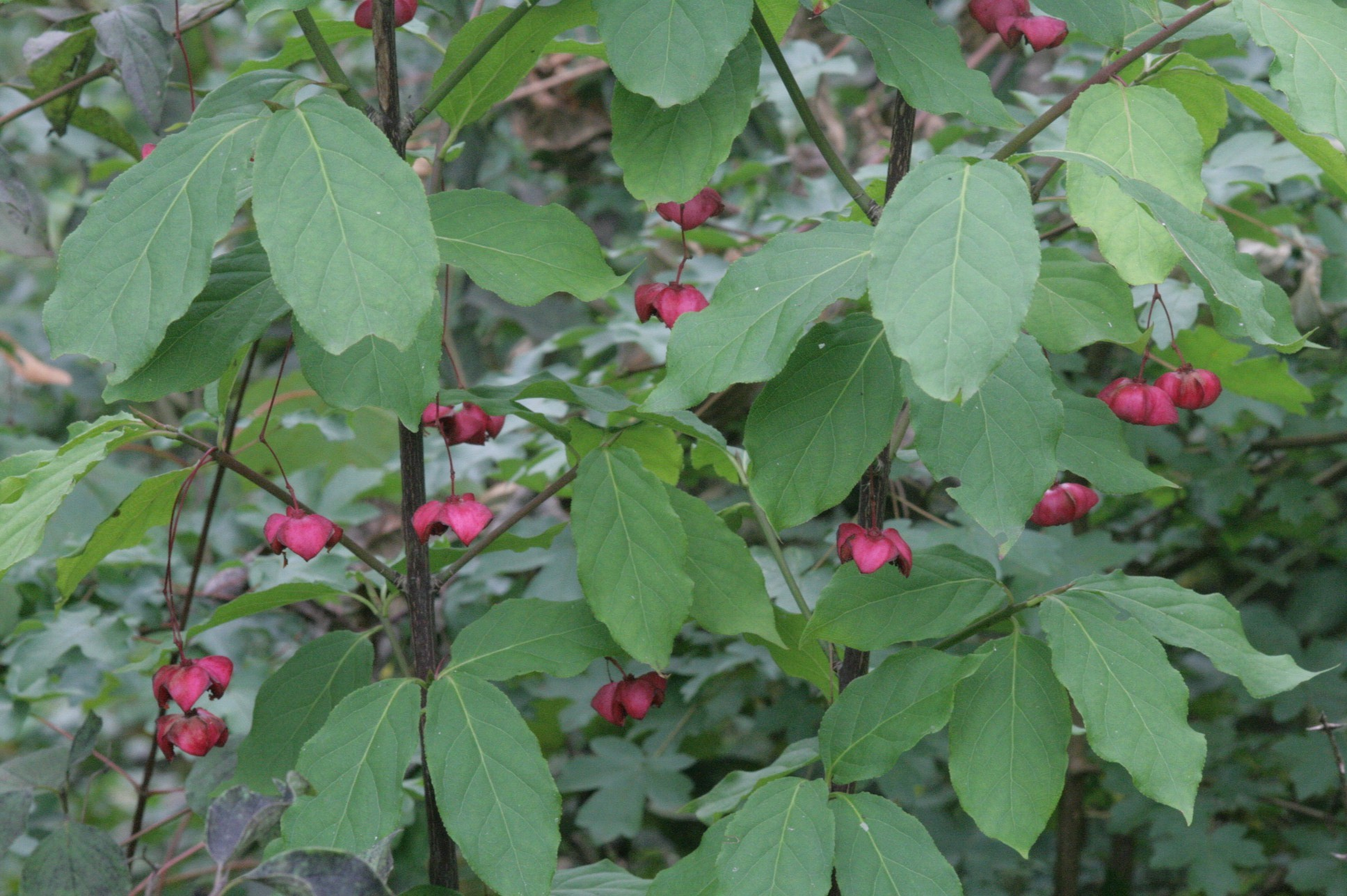
In Austria

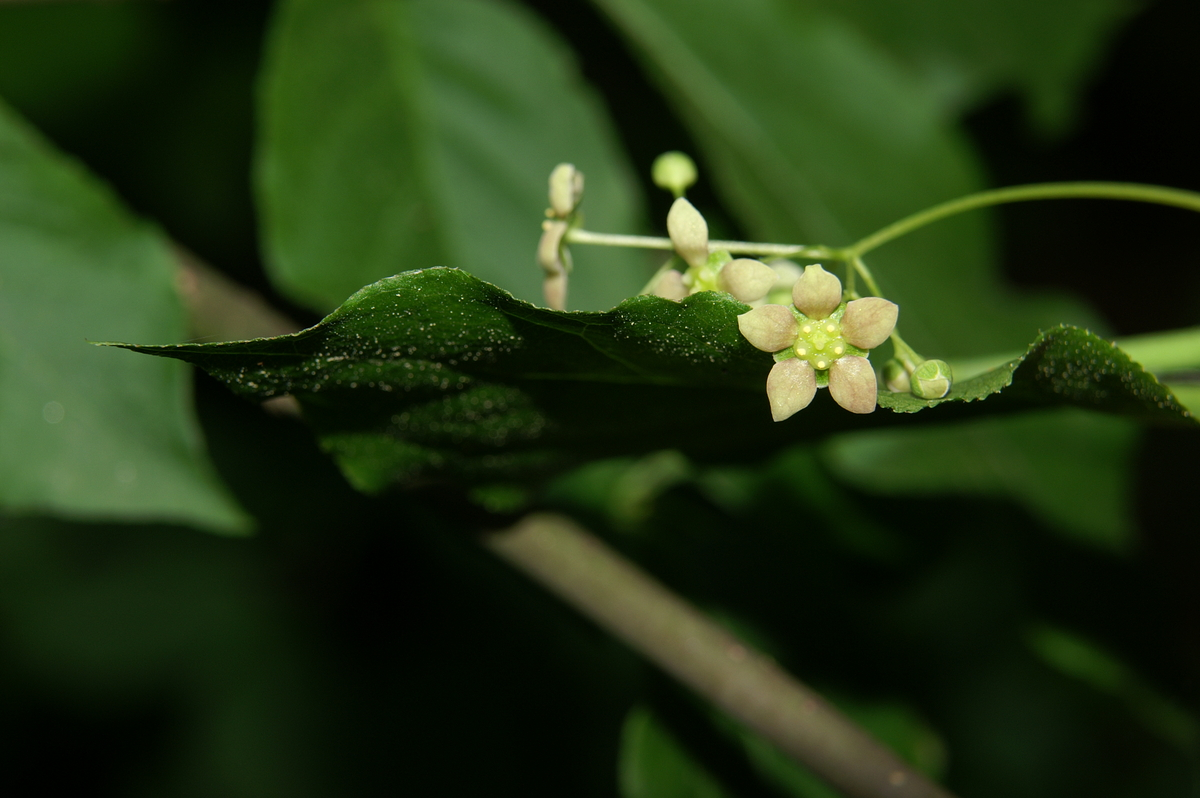
Flowers

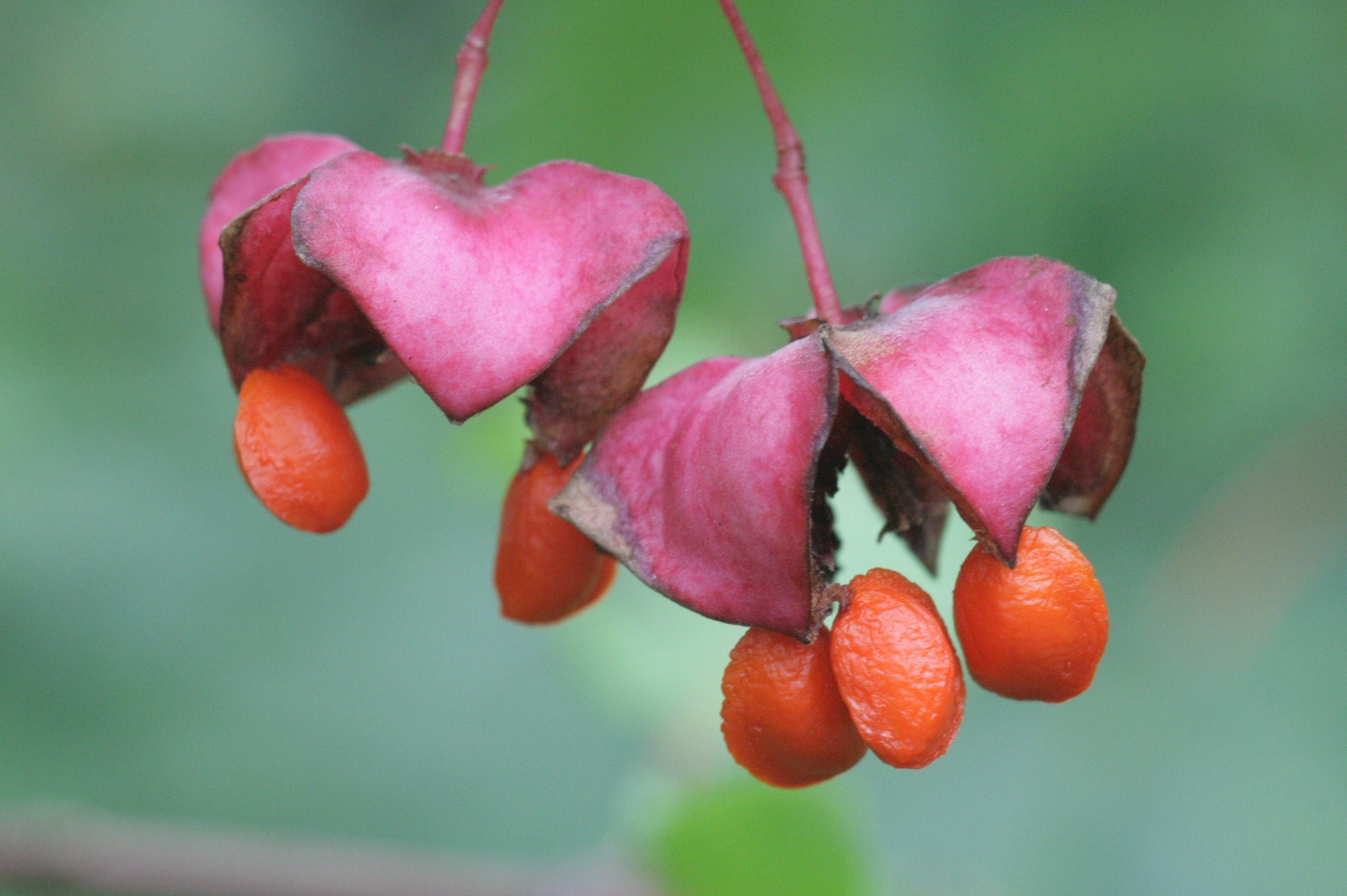
Close up of fruit

== Subtaxa ==
The following subspecies are accepted:

- Euonymus latifolius subsp. cauconis Coode & Cullen – northern Anatolia
- Euonymus latifolius subsp. latifolius – entire range
