= Northern Anatolian conifer and deciduous forests =

Ecoregion in Northern Anatolia, Turkey

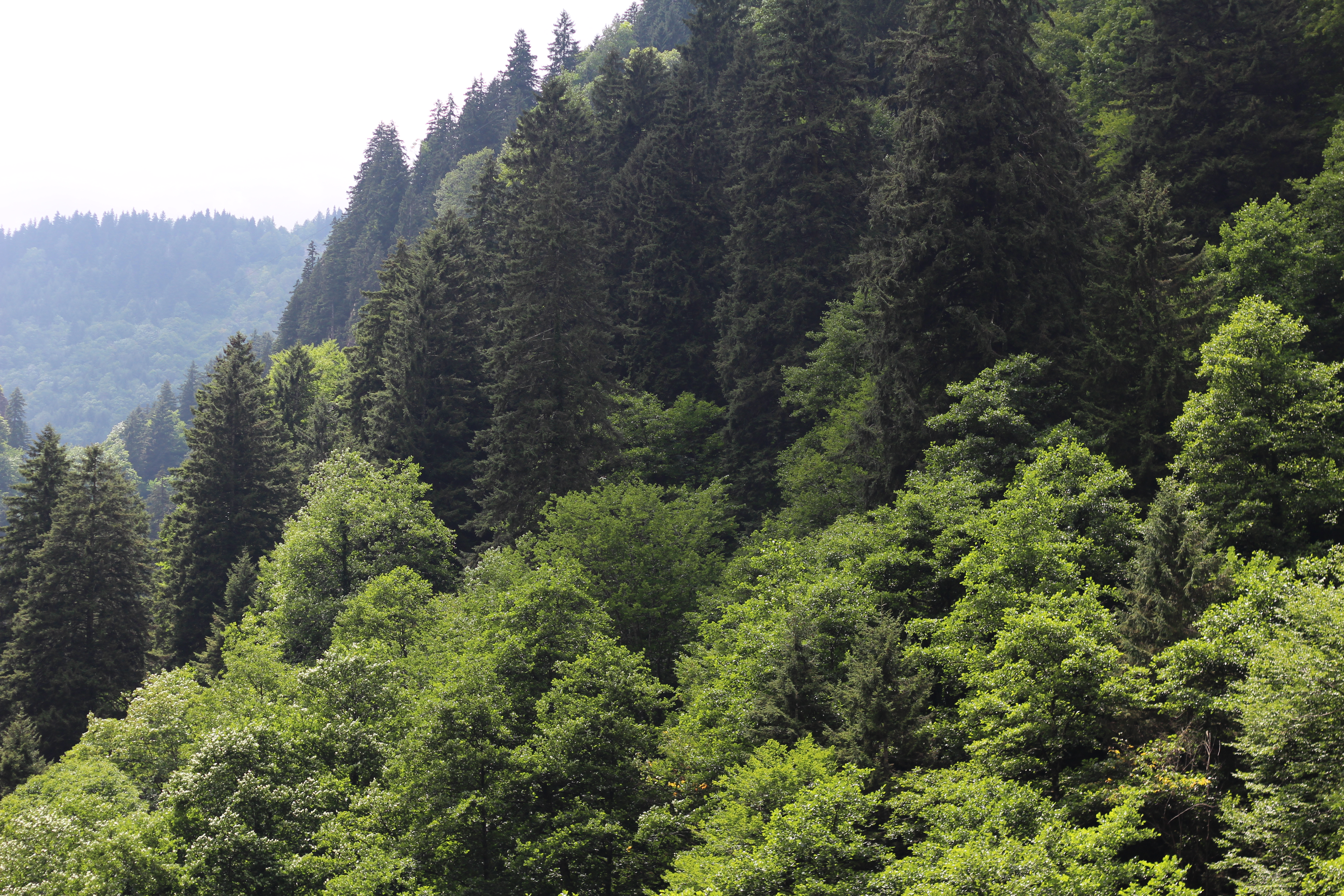
- Altındere Valley National Park

- Map of the ecoregion in Turkey

Ecology
- Realm: Palearctic
- Biome: Temperate coniferous forests
- Borders: List: Euxine-Colchic deciduous forests; Caucasus mixed forests; Eastern Anatolian deciduous forests; Central Anatolian deciduous forests; Anatolian conifer and deciduous mixed forests

Geography
- Area: 101,410 km^{2} (39,150 mi^{2})
- Country: Turkey

Conservation
- Conservation status: Critical/endangered

The Northern Anatolian conifer and deciduous forests is a temperate coniferous forests ecoregion located in northern Anatolia, Turkey.

== Geography ==
The ecoregion covers an area of 101,410 square kilometres (39,150 mi^{2}). It covers portions of the Pontic Mountains, which extend east and west across Northern Anatolia parallel to the southern coast of the Black Sea. The ecoregion lies between humid Euxine-Colchic deciduous forests, which cover the northern slope of the mountains and the Black Sea coast, and the drier forests, woodlands, and steppes of the Anatolian interior. The ecoregion extends to the Sündiken Mountains in the southwest, and Mount Türkmen or Türkmenbaba near Kütahya is a southwestern outlier of the ecoregion. The peaks are seldom higher than 2000 meters in the western and central mountains, and over 3000 meters in the Kaçkar Mountains in the northeast.

== Climate ==
The climate is transitional between the humid and moderate Black Sea coast, and the drier and more continental Anatolian interior. Average annual rainfall varies from 500 to 1,000 mm. In the western and central portions of the ecoregion, winter is the rainiest season, and in the east spring is the rainiest season.

== Flora ==
The ecoregion's forests are mostly conifers, with deciduous broadleaf trees.

In the western portion of the northern ranges, Turkish fir (Abies nordmanniana subsp. equi-trojani, syn. Abies bornmuelleriana) is predominant, mixed with oriental beech (Fagus orientalis), Scots pine (Pinus sylvestris), or both. Oriental spruce (Picea orientalis) is predominant in the northeast, along with Caucasian fir (Abies nordmanniana).

The southern ranges have a drier and more continental climate, and pines are the dominant trees. Anatolian black pine (Pinus nigra ssp. pallasiana) is more common in the west, and Scots pine in the east. Deciduous broadleaf trees are part of the southern forest, including species of oak (Quercus), maple (Acer), and Sorbus.

Open scrublands and small forest patches of juniper (Juniperus oxycedrus and Juniperus communis) and birch (Betula spp.) occur at high altitudes.

== Fauna ==
Large mammal predators include the brown bear (Ursus arctos) and gray wolf (Canis lupus). Red deer (Cervus elaphus) and roe deer (Capreolus capreolus) roam the west, and Anatolian chamois (Rupicapra rupicapra asiatica) and wild goat (Capra aegagrus) are found in the east.

== Protected areas ==
Protected areas include Kaçkar National Park, Altındere Valley National Park, Mount Ilgaz National Park, Yedigöller National Park, Soğuksu National Park, Yozgat Pine Grove National Park, Örümcek Gümüşhane Nature Reserve, Akdogan and Ruzgarlar Nature Reserve, Kale Bolu Hazelnut Nature Reserve, Kökez Bolu Nature Reserve, and Sülüklügöl Bolu Nature Reserve.
