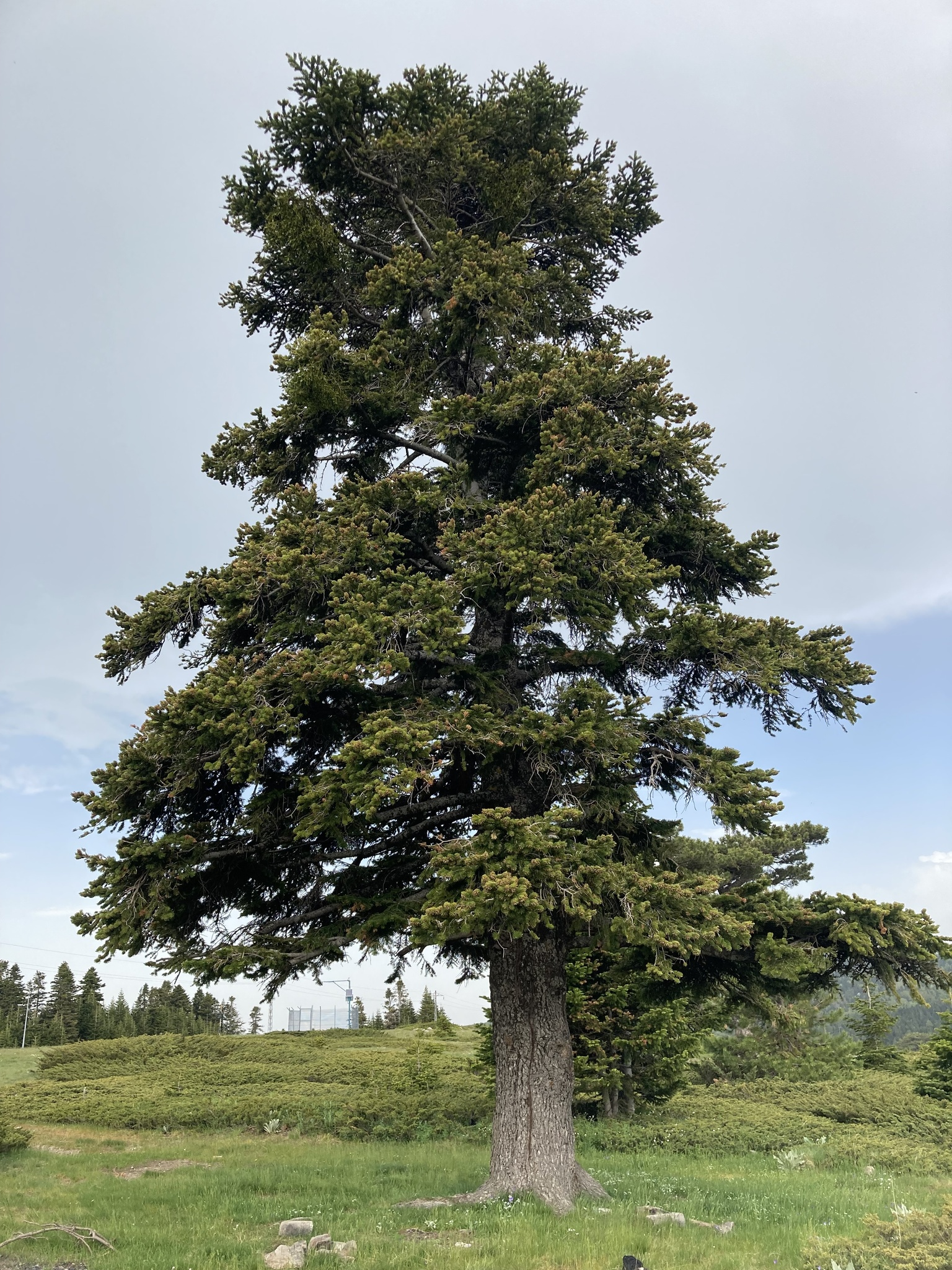
- Abies nordmanniana subsp. equi-trojani on Uludağ

Scientific classification
- Kingdom: Plantae
- Clade: Embryophytes
- Clade: Tracheophytes
- Clade: Spermatophytes
- Clade: Gymnosperms
- Division: Pinophyta
- Class: Pinopsida
- Order: Pinales
- Family: Pinaceae
- Genus: Abies
- Species: A. nordmanniana
- Subspecies: A. n. subsp. equi-trojani

Trinomial name
- Abies nordmanniana subsp. equi-trojani (Asch. & Sint. ex Boiss.) Coode & Cullen

Synonyms
- Abies alba subsp. equi-trojani (Asch. & Sint. ex Boiss.) Asch. & Graebn.; Abies bornmuelleriana Mattf.; Abies cephalonica var. graeca (Fraas) Tang S.Liu; Abies equi-trojani (Asch. & Sint. ex Boiss.) Mattf.; Abies nordmanniana var. bornmuelleriana (Mattf.) Silba; Abies nordmanniana subsp. bornmuelleriana (Mattf.) Coode & Cullen; Abies olcayana Ata & Merev; Abies pectinata var. equi-trojani Asch. & Sint. ex Boiss.

= Abies nordmanniana subsp. equi-trojani =

Species of conifer

Abies nordmanniana subsp. equi-trojani, synonym Abies bornmuelleriana, the Turkish fir is a rare evergreen coniferous tree native to northwest Turkey. Another common name is Uludağ fir. It is a subspecies of the Caucasian fir Abies nordmanniana. It has also variously been considered to be a distinct species Abies equi-trojani, a variety of Greek fir (Abies cephalonica, as A. c. var. graeca), or natural hybrid between Caucasian fir and Greek fir.

Turkish fir is typically a narrow and conical tree, with a mature height of 20 to 30 m (66 to 98 ft), with a trunk up to 1.8 to 4 m (5.9 to 13.1 ft) wide. It has dense, upswept needles 1.5 to 3 cm (0.59 to 1.18 in) long; they are dark green above, and silvery below with two stomatal bands. The seed cones are purplish-brown and 10 to 15 cm (3.9 to 5.9 in) long.

Its native range is in northwestern Turkey, including the western Pontic Mountains south of the Black Sea, and Uludağ and other mountains southeast of the Sea of Marmara, growing at 1,300–1,800 m altitude.
