= Wildlife of Turkey =

The wildlife of Turkey is abundant and diverse. Turkey is a large country with many geographic and climatic regions and a great diversity of plants and animals, each suited to its own particular habitat. About 1,500 species of vertebrates and 19,000 species of invertebrates have been recorded in the country. Some of the world's staple crops were first cultivated in this area and many of their wild relatives are still found here. The country acts as a crossroads for many birds during migration, connecting Europe, Asia, and the Near East.

== Biomes and ecoregions ==
The following is a list of ecoregions in Turkey as maintained by One Earth. Alternatively part of Turkey is included by the European Environment Agency: Black Sea Biogeographic Region, Anatolian Biogeographic Region and Mediterranean Biogeographic Region.

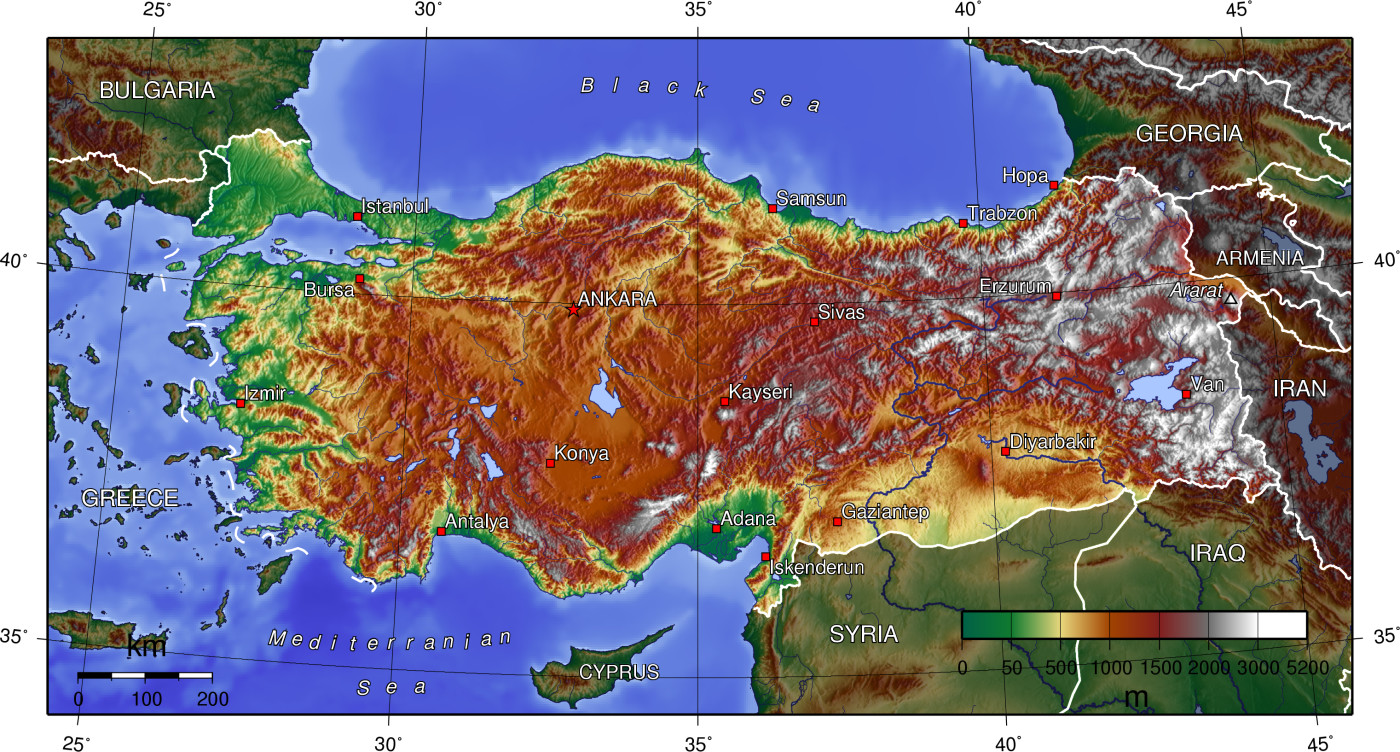
Topographic map of Turkey with the Aegean Sea to the west, the Black Sea to the north and the Mediterranean to the south

The geography of Turkey is roughly rectangular, being more than 1,600 km (990 mi) east-west and 800 km (500 mi) north-south. Turkey's 783,562 km^{2} (302,535 sq mi) of land is divided into two parts by the Bosphorus, the Sea of Marmara and the Dardanelles; European Turkey makes up only 3% of the country, with the rest being in Asia and often known as Anatolia.

The country has varied topography with fertile coastal plains contrasting with mountainous regions in the centre and eastern part of the country. The climate of Turkey also varies, with the weather systems found near the coasts contrasting with those prevailing in the interior. The Aegean and Mediterranean coasts have hot, dry summers and cool, rainy winters. The interior of the country has a continental climate with severe weather on the Anatolian plateau in winter and hot, dry summers. These large differences in climate are reflected in an extremely diverse wildlife.

Because it is mountainous the country has a lot of biomes. The ecoregions of Turkey include the important terrestrial Eastern Anatolian deciduous forests and Southern Anatolian montane conifer and deciduous forests. There are also small areas of bottomland forest. Turkey includes portions of three biodiversity hotspots: the Mediterranean Basin, the Caucasus, and the Irano-Anatolian.

== Flora ==
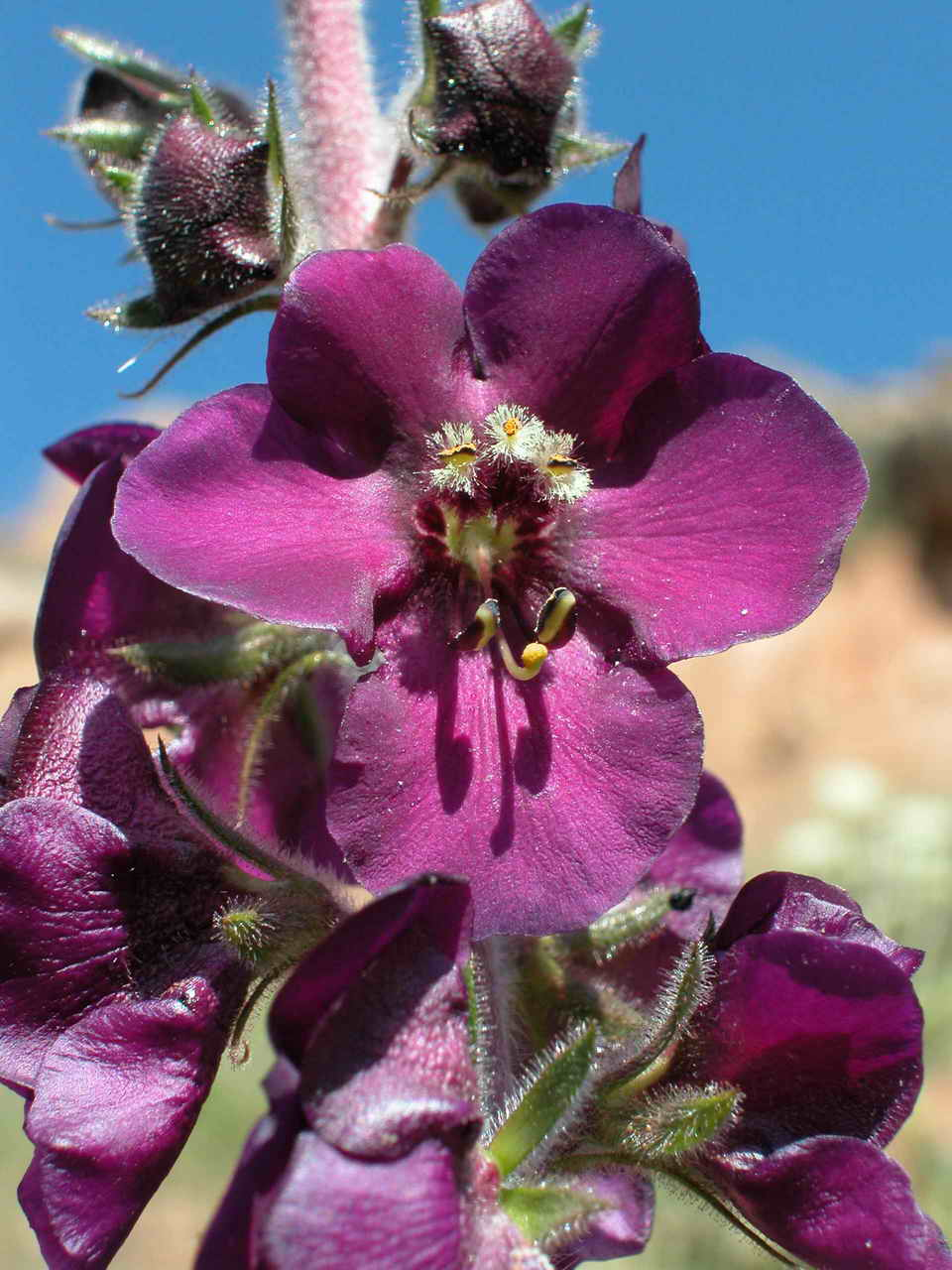
Verbascum wiedemannianum: this showy Mullein is typical of the central Anatolian steppe. Like most of the Turkish Verbascum-species it is endemic to Anatolia.

The flora of Turkey consists of almost 10,000 species of plants, as well as a number of fungi and algae. Around 32% of Turkey's plants are found only in the country. One reason for the high proportion of endemics is that Anatolia is both mountainous and quite fragmented. The country is divided into three main floristic areas: the Mediterranean, Euro-Siberian, and Irano-Turanian area. The flora of the European part of Turkey is similar to that of adjoining Greece. The ecoregions here include Balkan mixed forests dominated by oaks, and Aegean and Western Turkey sclerophyllous and mixed forests where some of the main species are oaks, strawberry tree, Greek strawberry tree, Spanish broom and laurel. The country is at a meeting point of three phytogeographical regions Mediterranean, Euro-Siberian, and Irano-Turonian. The region played a key role in the early cultivation of wheat, other cereals, and various horticultural crops.

The Euro-Siberian area is a mountainous part of western Turkey. Here the flora transitions from the Mediterranean vegetation type to the Anatolian plateau. The dominant vegetation cover here is forests of oak and pine, especially Anatolian black pine and Turkish pine. Further east is the Anatolian plateau, a largely treeless area of plains and river basins at an average altitude of 1,000 m (3,300 ft). This area is characterised by hot dry summers and cold winters. Salt steppes and lakes are found here, as well salt-free grassland areas, marshes and freshwater systems. Immediately around the large Lake Tuz and other saline areas, saltmarsh plants grow, and beyond this is a sharp divide, with the flora being dominated by members of the families Chenopodiaceae and Plumbaginaceae.

The mountainous eastern half of the country is separated floristically from the rest of the country by the Anatolian diagonal, a floral break that crosses the country from the eastern end of the Black Sea to the northeastern corner of the Mediterranean Sea. Many species found to the east of this break are not found to the west and vice versa, and about four hundred species are only found along this divide. The natural vegetation in eastern Turkey is the Eastern Anatolian deciduous forests; in these oaks such as Brant's oak, Lebanon oak, Aleppo oak and Mount Thabor's oak predominate in open woodland with Scots pine, burnet rose, dog-rose, oriental plane, alder, sweet chestnut, maple, Caucasian honeysuckle (Lonicera caucasica) and common juniper.

Most European species are found in Turkey. The most important reasons for the high plant biodiversity are believed to be the relatively high proportion of endemics, together with the high variety of soils and climate of Turkey.

In Anatolia the Pleistocene glaciations only covered the highest peaks, so there are many species with small ranges. In other words: Anatolia as a whole is a big “massif de refuge”, showing all degrees of past and recent speciation.

Naturally much of the vegetation would be steppe and forest, however people have cleared much forest and their animals have changed the vegetation by grazing.

== Fauna ==
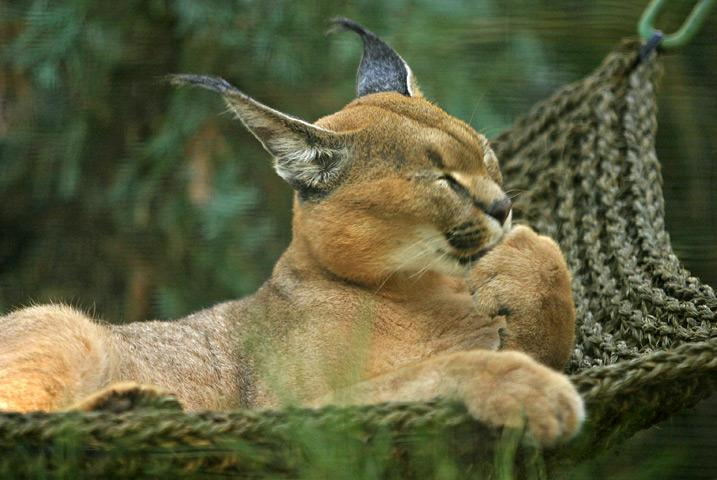
Caracal, one of Turkey's wild cats

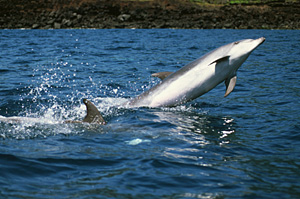
Common bottlenose dolphin

The fauna of Turkey is abundant and varied. The wildlife of Turkey includes a great diversity of plants and animals, each suited to its own particular habitat, as it is a large country with many geographic and climatic regions. About 1,500 species of vertebrates have been recorded in the country and around 19,000 species of invertebrates. The country is a biological crossroads with links to Europe, Asia, and the Near East. Many birds use the country as a staging post during migration.

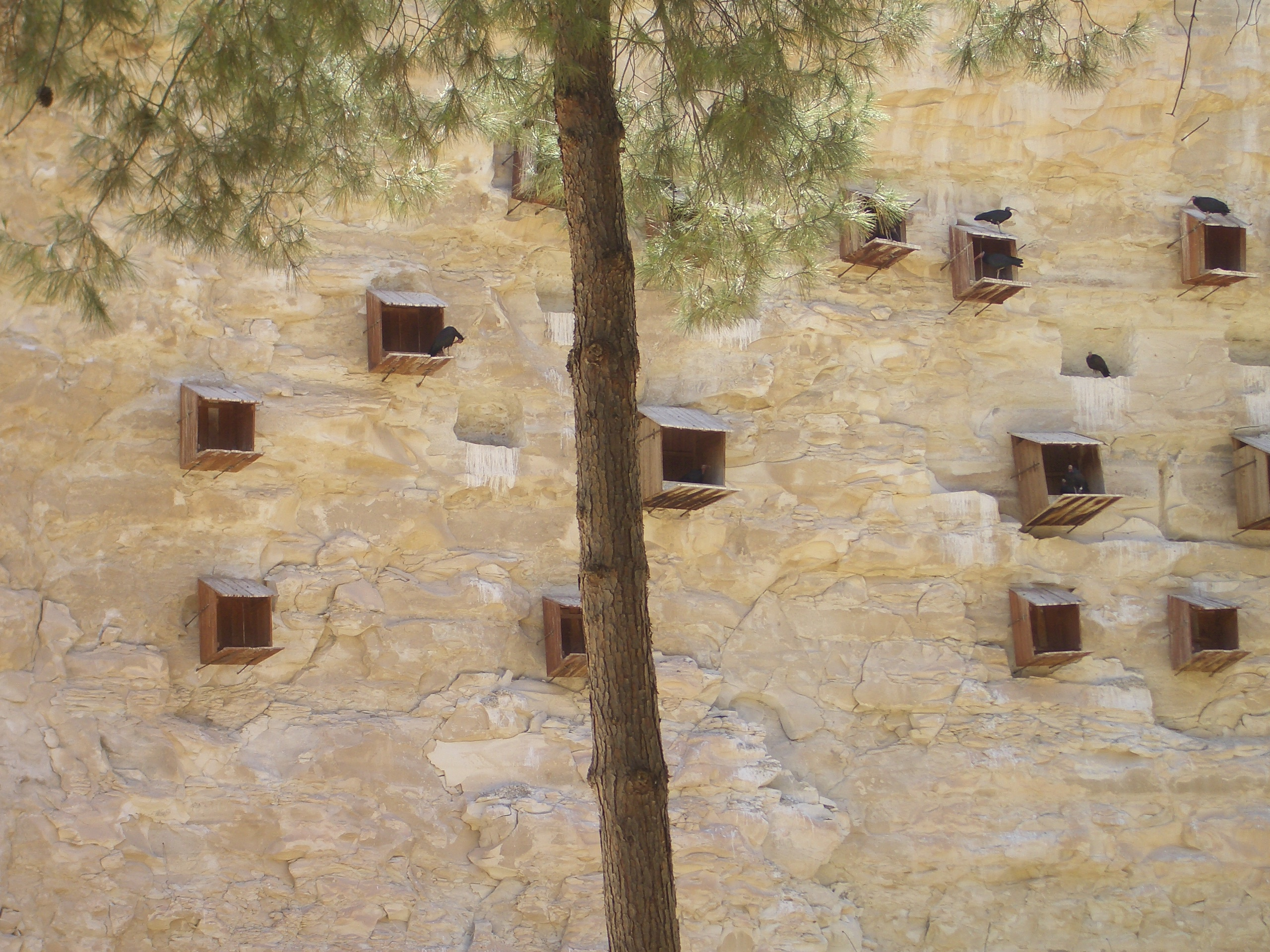
Human-made nests for northern bald ibises in Birecik

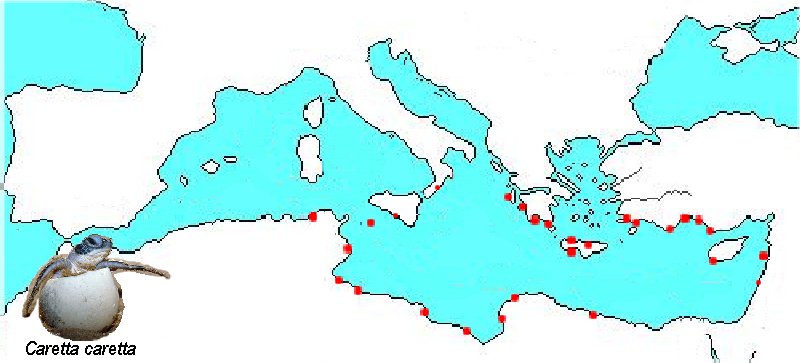
Loggerhead sea turtle nesting places by the Mediterranean Sea

== Threats ==
Threats to biodiversity include desertification due to climate change in Turkey, which is forecast to move the ecoregions northwards, and large scale infrastructure projects such as those near Istanbul. Land degradation threatens biodiversity loss, and water scarcity is also a problem. Küre and Kaçkar Mountains National Parks have been suggested for rewilding. Several marine fish and mammals have greatly declined, in part due to overfishing.

== Policy ==
Turkey enforced the Berne Convention on the Conservation of European Wildlife and Natural Habitats from 1999, but according to one study laws and legal decisions still had some deficiencies in 2019, especially regarding migratory species and international coordination. The government plans to increase protected areas from the 9% in 2019 to 17% by 2023. Official restrictions on access to environmental information hamper biodiversity monitoring. In 2020 it was suggested that more use of remote sensing and citizen science could help to make the first complete map of the nation's land cover.

== See also ==
- Environmental issues in Turkey
- List of national parks of Turkey
- Wildlife of Iraq
- Wildlife of Iran
