= Sappho (disambiguation) =

Sappho (died c. 570 BC) was an ancient Greek poet.

Sappho may also refer to:

== Arts and entertainment ==
- Sappho (painting), an 1890s art piece by Ernst Stückelberg
- Sappho (play), an 1818 tragedy by Franz Grillparzer
- Sappho (novel), an 1884 novel by Alphonse Daudet
- Sappho (1921 film), a German silent film starring Pola Negri
- Sappho (2008 film), an American movie
- Sappho, a 1963 opera by Peggy Glanville-Hicks

== Organisations ==
- Sappho (organisation), a lesbian social group in the United Kingdom
- Sappho for Equality, an LGBT rights campaign group in East India

== Other people with the name ==
- Sappho Çoban (born 1994), German judoka
- Sappho Leontias (1832–1900), Greek writer

== Places ==
- Sappho, Washington, an unincorporated community in the United States
- Sappho Point, a headland on the island of South Georgia

== Science ==
- Sappho (bird), a hummingbird genus
- 80 Sappho, a stony, main-belt asteroid

== Ships ==
- Sappho (ship), one of several mercantile vessels
- HMS Sappho, one of five vessels of the British Royal Navy, or two planned vessels
- USS Sappho, either of two vessels of the United States Navy
- Sappho (yacht), yacht raced in the 1871 Americas Cup

== See also ==
- Saffo (disambiguation)
- Sapho (disambiguation)
- Sapphic (disambiguation)
