= Lesbia (disambiguation) =

Lesbia was a figure in Roman poetry. Lesbia is also a female given name.

Lesbia may also refer to:

== People ==
- Lesbia Castillo, Venezuelan politician
- Lesbia Harford (1891–1927), Australian poet, novelist and political activist
- Lesbia Scott, the author of I Sing a Song of the Saints of God
- Lesbia Soravilla (1906–1989), Cuban writer, feminist and activist
- Lesbia Thorpe (1919–2009), Australian artist
- Lesbia Urquía (1967–2016), Honduran human rights activist
- Lesbia Vent Dumois (born 1932), Cuban artist

== Biology ==
- Lesbia (bird), a hummingbird genus
  - Lesbia nuna (green-tailed trainbearer)
  - Lesbia victoriae (black-tailed trainbearer)
- Acalyptris lesbia, a species of moth
- Catocala lesbia, a species of moth
- Colias lesbia, a species of butterfly
- Mordellistena lesbia, a species of beetle

== Other uses ==
- Lesbia (play), an 1888 play by Richard Davey
- Lesbia Brandon, an erotic novel by Algernon Charles Swinburne
- A nickname for Julia Livilla (18–41), used by Robert Graves in his Claudius novels

== See also ==
- Lesbian (disambiguation)
