= Aytacia =

Scientific classification
- Kingdom: Plantae
- Clade: Tracheophytes
- Clade: Angiosperms
- Clade: Eudicots
- Clade: Asterids
- Order: Asterales
- Family: Asteraceae
- Genus: Aytacia; Yıld. (2020)
- Species: A. turkica

Binomial name
- Aytacia turkica Yıld. (2020)

Synonyms
- Scorzonera turkica (Yıld.) Yıld. (2021), not accepted by the author.

Genus of flowering plants

Aytacia is a monotypic genus in the sunflower family (Asteraceae) containing the single species Aytacia turkica, a flowering plant that is endemic to Turkey. Described as a new species in 2020, this distinctive plant is characterised by its greyish appearance, slightly curved leaves, and single yellow flower heads on unbranched stems that can reach 40–50 cm in length despite the plant's small 10–12 cm stature.

== Description ==
Aytacia turkica is a dwarf perennial plant that reaches a height of 10–12 cm and has a distinctive appearance characterised by its greyish colouration. Its base is crowded with the remains of dead leaf stalks, and it possesses a thick, cylindrical rootstock.

The leaves of Aytacia turkica are simple and measure about 8 cm long by 2–3 mm wide. They have a linear-lanceolate to lanceolate shape (elongated and somewhat lance-shaped), with a slightly curved form that botanists describe as "subfalcate". The leaf margins are entire (without teeth or lobes), and the leaves are densely covered with short, greyish-white hairs, giving them a canescent appearance. Each leaf narrows at its base into a petiole (leaf stalk) of about 2 cm and has an acute (pointed) tip.

The flowering stems are unbranched and bear a single flower head (capitulum) which can reach 40–50 cm in length. The inner bracts (phyllaries) that surround the flower head are 30–40 mm long, linear-oblong to linear-lanceolate in shape, with pointed tips and narrow, papery margins. The outer bracts are shorter at 12–16 mm long. The flowers are yellow.

The fruits, known botanically as achenes, are 16–18 mm long with 10 longitudinal wings, and are glabrous (hairless), ridged, and have a rough surface described as verrucose. The pappus (the modified calyx that assists in seed dispersal) is roughly 25 mm long, with a colour ranging from brown to pale brown. The pappus hairs are barbellate (with short lateral protrusions) in the upper part and plumose (feathery) in the lower part.

== Habitat and distribution ==
Aytacia turkica flowers in June and July. It inhabits steppe environments, screes, and forest clearings at elevations of about 1,700–2,600 metres above sea level. The species is endemic to Turkey, specifically found in the Anatolian-Turanian floristic region.

== Taxonomy ==
Aytacia turkica was scientifically described by the botanist Şinasi Yıldırımlı in 2020, who established both the new monotypic genus Aytacia and the species A. turkica. The genus name honours the Turkish botanist Professor Zeki Aytaç, who made contributions to the flora of Turkey and plant taxonomy, particularly in the genus Astragalus (Fabaceae). The specific epithet turkica refers to Turkey, the country to which this species is endemic.

This taxon was formerly classified as Scorzonera boissieri Lipsch. (described in 1963), but morphological studies led to its reclassification as a separate genus. Aytacia belongs to the subfamily Cichorioideae, tribe Cichorieae, and subtribe Scorzonerinae within the family Asteraceae. The genus is distinguished from other members of Scorzonerinae by its dwarf habit, scapigerous growth form, simple subfalcate leaves, singular flower heads per stem, and distinctively 10-winged achenes.

In Turkish, the plant has been given the vernacular name On kanatlı tekesakalı (meaning 'ten-winged goat's beard'), while the genus is referred to as Kanatlı tekesakalı ('winged goat's beard').
