= Flora of Turkey =

Plants that grow in the Eurasian country

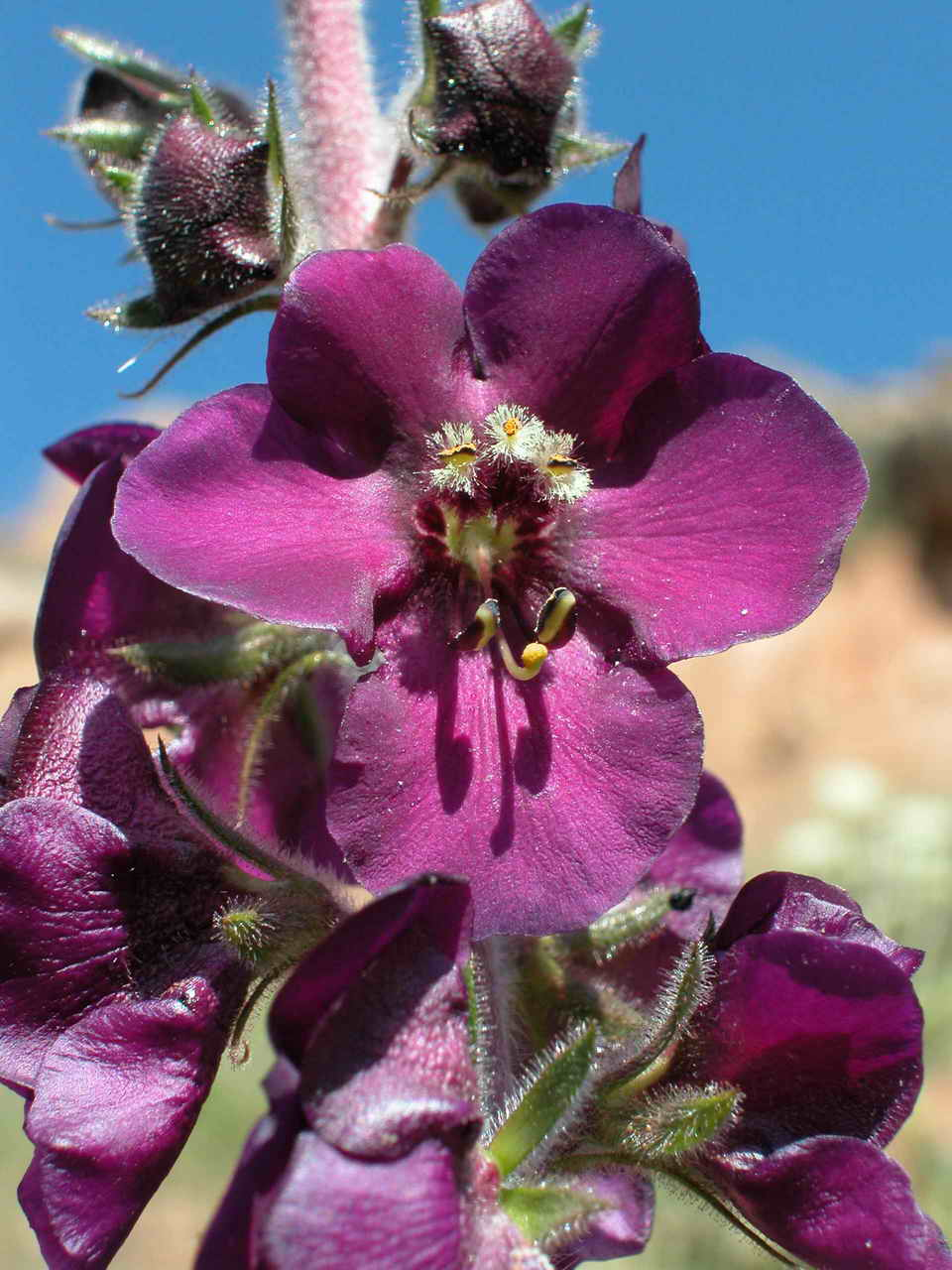
Verbascum wiedemannianum: this showy Mullein is typical of the central Anatolian steppe. Like most of the Turkish Verbascum-species it is endemic to Anatolia.

The flora of Turkey consists of almost 10,000 species of plants, as well as a number of fungi and algae. Around 32% of Turkey's plants are found only in the country. One reason for the high proportion of endemics is that Anatolia is both mountainous and quite fragmented. The country is divided into three main floristic areas: the Mediterranean, Euro-Siberian, and Irano-Turanian area. The flora of the European part of Turkey is similar to that of adjoining Greece. The ecoregions here include Balkan mixed forests dominated by oaks, and Aegean and Western Turkey sclerophyllous and mixed forests where some of the main species are oaks, strawberry tree, Greek strawberry tree, Spanish broom and laurel. The country is at a meeting point of three phytogeographical regions Mediterranean, Euro-Siberian, and Irano-Turonian. The region played a key role in the early cultivation of wheat, other cereals, and various horticultural crops.

The Euro-Siberian area is a mountainous part of western Turkey. Here the flora transitions from the Mediterranean vegetation type to the Anatolian plateau. The dominant vegetation cover here is forests of oak and pine, especially Anatolian black pine and Turkish pine. Further east is the Anatolian plateau, a largely treeless area of plains and river basins at an average altitude of 1,000 m (3,300 ft). This area is characterised by hot dry summers and cold winters. Salt steppes and lakes are found here, as well salt-free grassland areas, marshes and freshwater systems. Immediately around the large Lake Tuz and other saline areas, saltmarsh plants grow, and beyond this is a sharp divide, with the flora being dominated by members of the families Chenopodiaceae and Plumbaginaceae.

The mountainous eastern half of the country is separated floristically from the rest of the country by the Anatolian diagonal, a floral break that crosses the country from the eastern end of the Black Sea to the northeastern corner of the Mediterranean Sea. Many species found to the east of this break are not found to the west and vice versa, and about four hundred species are only found along this divide. The natural vegetation in eastern Turkey is the Eastern Anatolian deciduous forests; in these oaks such as Brant's oak, Lebanon oak, Aleppo oak and Mount Thabor's oak predominate in open woodland with Scots pine, burnet rose, dog-rose, oriental plane, alder, sweet chestnut, maple, Caucasian honeysuckle (Lonicera caucasica) and common juniper.

Most European species are found in Turkey. The most important reasons for the high plant biodiversity are believed to be the relatively high proportion of endemics, together with the high variety of soils and climate of Turkey.

In Anatolia the Pleistocene glaciations only covered the highest peaks, so there are many species with small ranges. In other words: Anatolia as a whole is a big “massif de refuge”, showing all degrees of past and recent speciation.

Naturally much of the vegetation would be steppe and forest, however people have cleared much forest and their animals have changed the vegetation by grazing.

== Diversity and endemism ==
=== Vascular plants ===
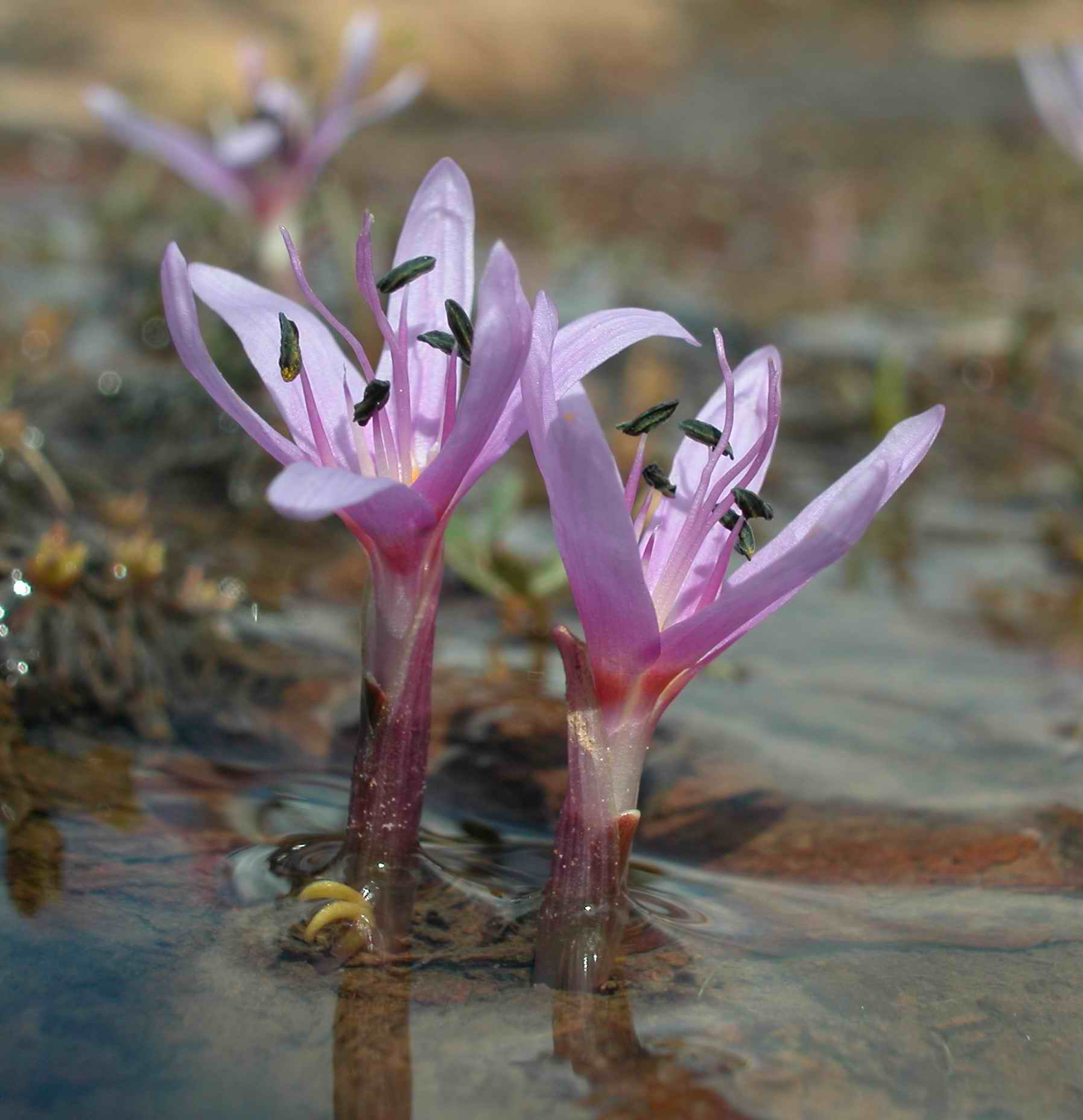
Colchicum figlalii (Ö. Varol) Parolly & Eren: This punctual endemic of Sandras Dağ, a serpentine mountain near Muğla, was described as new to science in 1995.

A third of Turkish plant species are endemic to Turkey: one reason there are so many is because the surface of Anatolia is both mountainous and quite fragmented. In fact, the Anatolian mountains resemble archipelagos like the famous Galapagos Islands. Since Darwin we know that geographic isolation between islands or separated mountains is an important means of speciation, leading to high spatial diversity. For Anatolia this assumption is confirmed by concentrations of endemism on highly isolated and relatively old massifs such as Uludağ and Ilgaz Dağ, whereas very young volcanic cones such as Erciyes Dağ and Hassan Dağ are surprisingly poor in endemics.

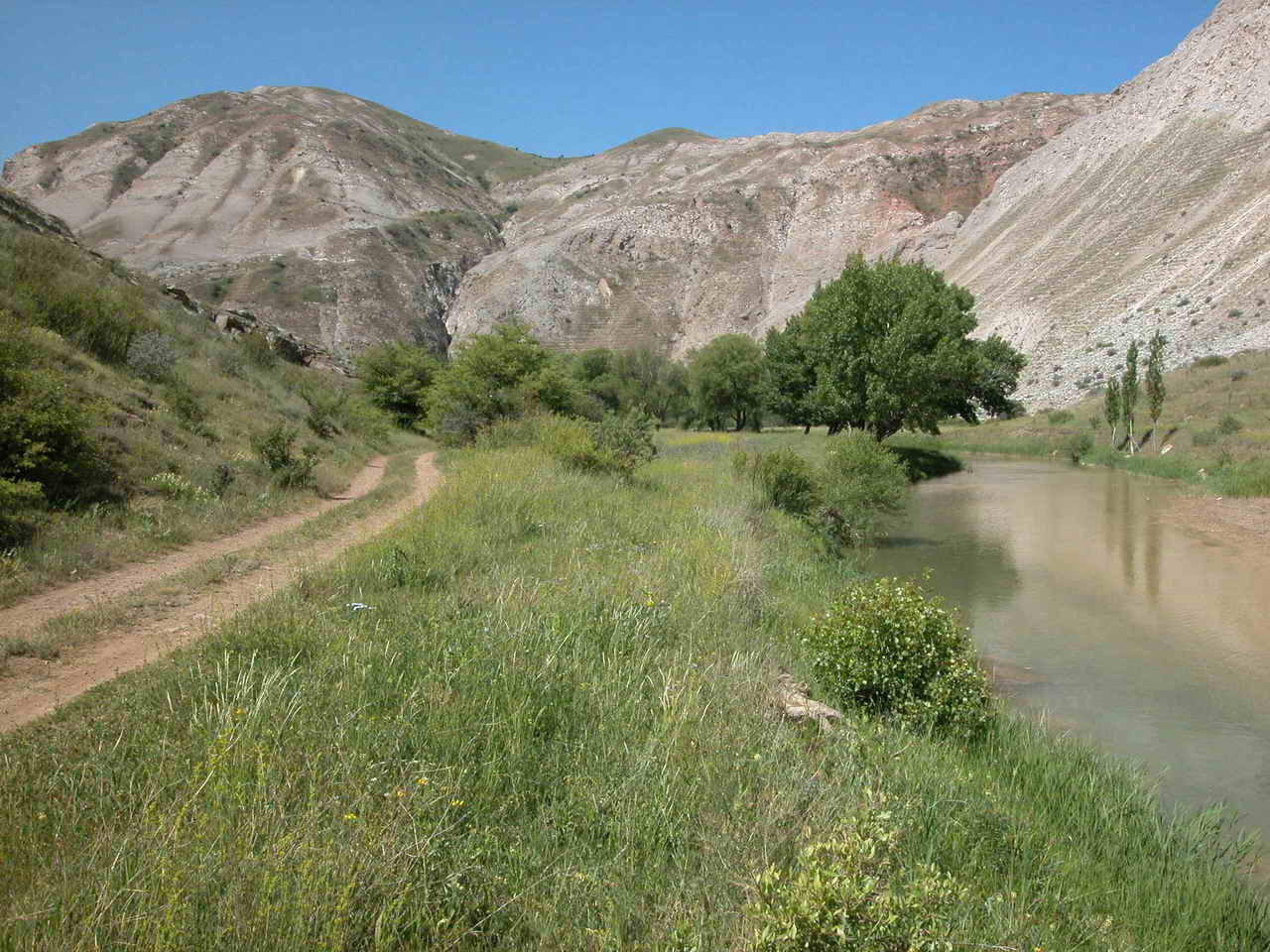
Gypsum hills south of Sivas: gypsum and serpentine areas are exceptionally rich in endemic species

For a visitor from Central Europe, climatic diversity within Turkey is quite astonishing. All climatic zones present in Europe can be found in Turkey on a somewhat smaller scale. The Black Sea coast is humid all year round, with the highest rainfall between Rize and Hopa. South of the Pontic Range there is much less rain so Central Anatolia is dry; also it is cold in the winter. Approaching the southern and western coasts, the climate turns more and more Mediterranean, with mild but very rainy winters and dry, hot summers. This simple scheme is complicated a lot by the mountainous surface of Anatolia. On the high mountains, harsh climatic conditions persist all the year round and, as of 2019, there are glaciers in Turkey, for example on Mount Ararat.

Anatolia's diversity of soils is astonishingly high. Saline soils are quite common in the driest parts of central Anatolia; additionally, the Aras valley between Kağızman and Armenia is full of impressive salt outlets, some pouring directly out of the mountains and thus resembling snow patches from a distance. South of Sivas and around Gürün there are extensive gypsum hills with a very special flora. A further lot of endemics have been described from the extensive serpentine areas in South-West Anatolia, especially Sandras Dağ (Cicekbaba D.) near Köyceğiz.

The Anatolian diagonal is an ecological dividing line that runs slant-wise across central and eastern Turkey from the northeastern corner of the Mediterranean Sea to the southeastern part of the Black Sea. Many species of plants that exist west of the diagonal are not present to the east, while others found to the east are not in the west. Of 550 species analysed, 135 were found to be "eastern" and 228 "western". Besides the Anatolian diagonal forming a barrier to floral biodiversity, about four hundred species of plant are endemic to the diagonal itself.

Flora of Akdoğan Mountains, Eastern Anatolia region. Quçan region is completely brown soil. Other places are semi-brown and consist of different types of soil.

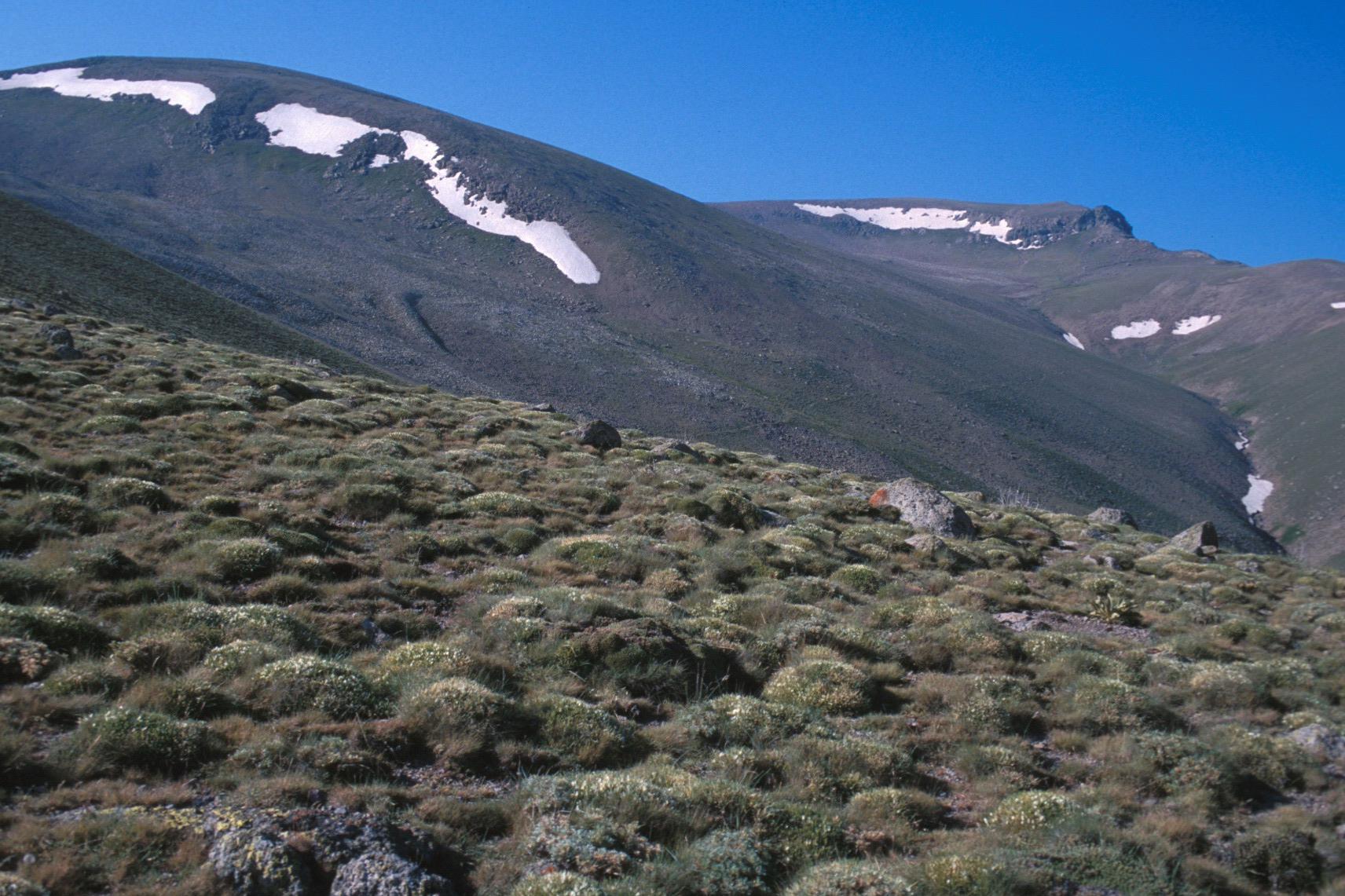
Heavily pastured thorn-cushion vegetation, consisting mainly of Astragalus angustifolius.— Melendiz Daği (Niğde), c. 2000 m s.l.

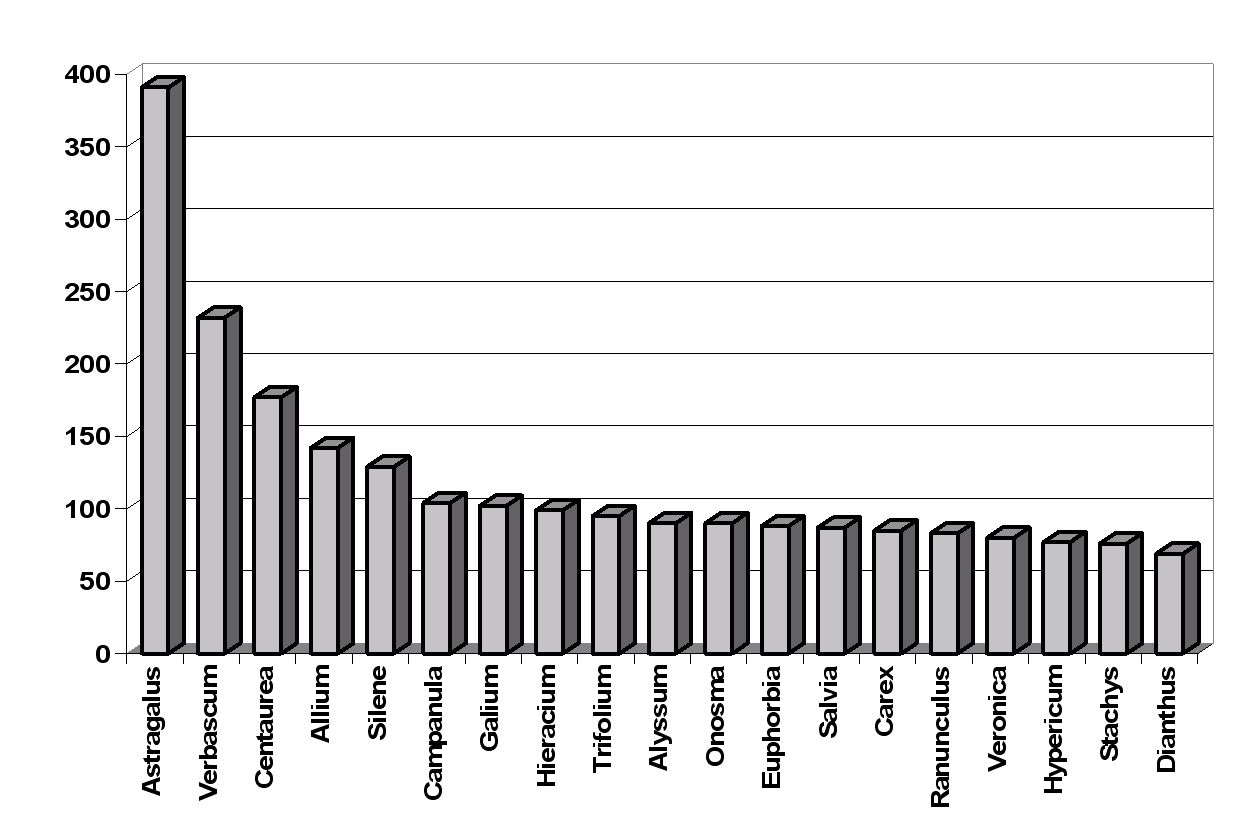
Species-numbers of the most important genera in Turkey

With almost 400 species the genus Astragalus (milk-vetch, goat's-thorn; Fabaceae) has by far the most species of the Turkish flora; as historically humans have dramatically expanded its favored treeless, dry and heavily grazed habitats. But not as many as Central Asia: the former USSR has twice as many. The plasticity of this genus is astonishingly high. Depending on environmental conditions a big variety of life forms evolved, ranging from tiny annuals to small woody and thorny bushes. Speciation seems to be in plain progress in Astragalus. Nearly all of its different sections consists of clusters of closely related species whose determination is one of the hardest tasks in a closer study of the Anatolian flora. One of the most successful growth forms of Turkish Astragali is the thorn cushion, which is very characteristic of the dry mountains of inner Anatolia. Such thorn cushions were not exclusively invented by many Astragali. Really striking examples of convergent evolution are the impressive thorn cushions of Onobrychis cornuta, also belonging to the Fabaceae. But there are a lot of thorn cushions also in Acantholimon (Plumbaginaceae). Even some Asteraceae (in Turkey e.g. Centaurea urvillei, C. iberica) and Caryophyllaceae (e.g. Minuartia juniperina) evolved in that direction. Second in importance comes Verbascum (Scrophulariaceae) and third is Centaurea (Asteraceae). For Verbascum Turkey evidently is the centre of distribution. Of approximately 360 species worldwide no less than 232 are to be found in Turkey, almost 80% of them being Anatolian endemics! Most Verbascum species are protected against water loss and hungry cattle by a dense cover of tree-shaped micro hairs. Centaurea species rarely have woolly hairs, but in defence against heavy grazing developed thorny phyllaries, or evolved to have no visible stem or a very short one.

=== Non-vascular plants ===
There are over 700 species of moss.

=== Fungi ===
There are over 12,000 varieties of mushroom in Turkey, some of which are edible.

=== Algae ===
There are over 2000 taxa of freshwater algae.

== Vegetation types ==
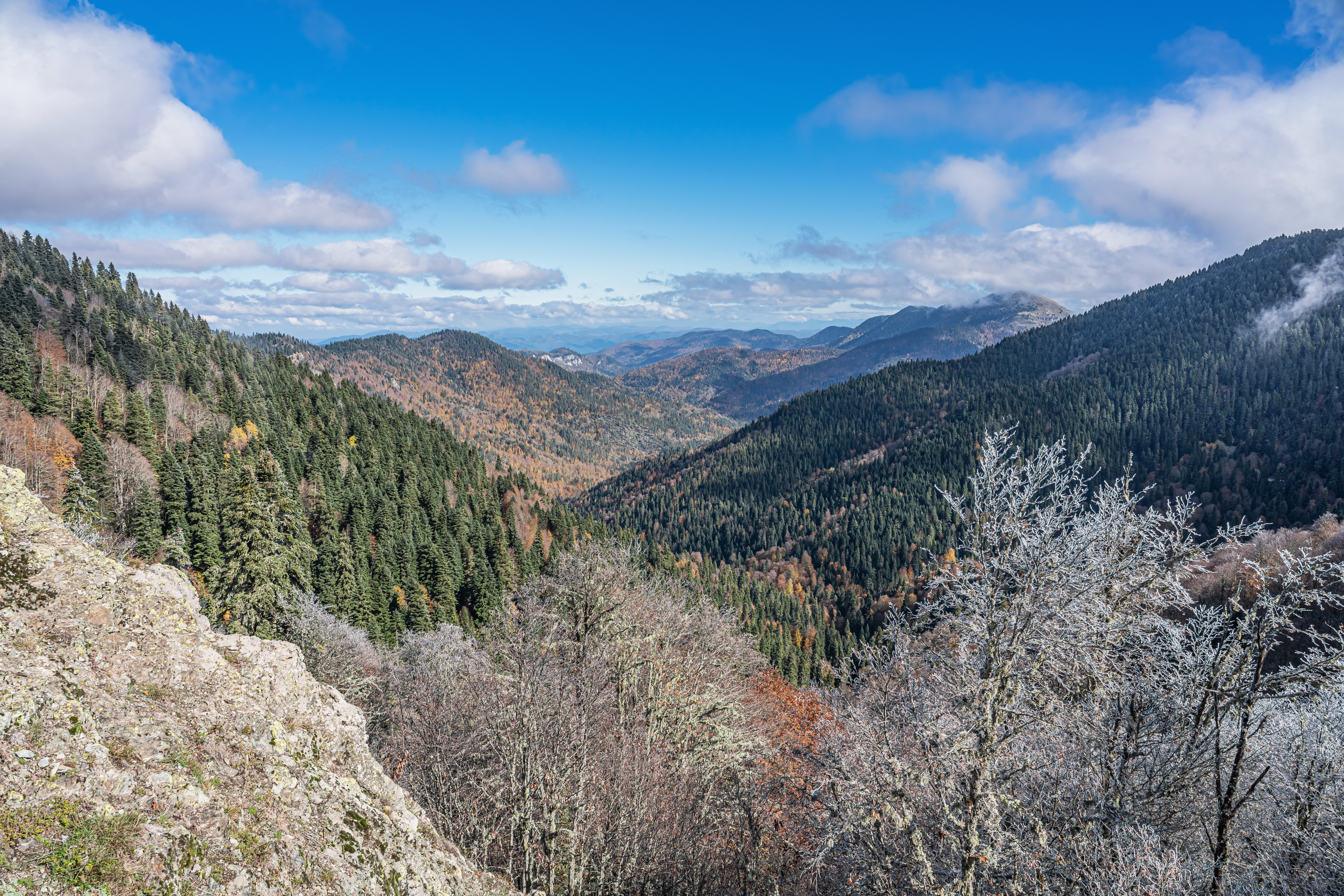
Autumn in Yedigöller National Park

Forests cover almost a third of Turkey. They are almost all state-owned, and vary from temperate rainforest in the north-east to maquis in the south and west. Pine, fir, oak and beech are common.

After the glaciers retreated over ten thousand years ago, woods grew to cover most of the land which is now Turkey; however over thousands of years, many of the trees have been cut down. The country is slowly reforesting, which is beneficial for its wildlife and to absorb carbon to help limit climate change.

As of the mid-2020s, the main product of Turkey's forests is wood, and they are also important for recreation. Almost half the forest is badly degraded, and the woodlands are threatened by drought, wildfire, mining, and pests and diseases.

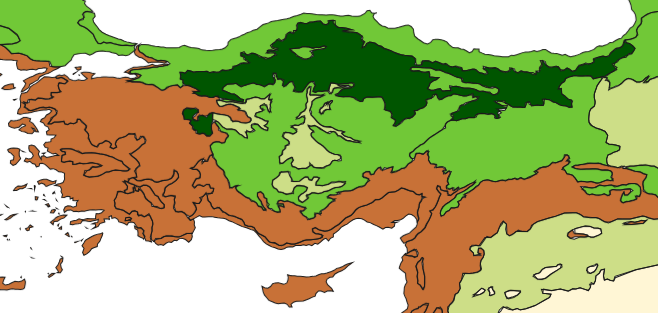
Biomes of TurkeyZagros Mountain Forests & East Anatolian Steppe Bioregion Black Sea, Caucasus-Anatolian Mixed Forests & Steppe Bioregion Aegean Sea & East Mediterranean Mixed Forests Bioregion Balkan Mixed Forests Ecoregion

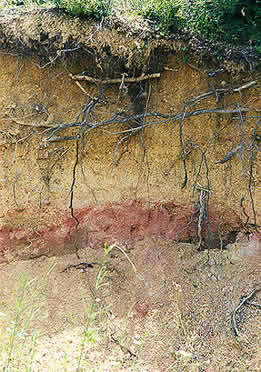
Soil profile with oxidation in Manisa Province, Turkey

The main types of soil in Turkey are calcisols, cambisols and leptosols, and fluvisols.

By the mid-20th century erosion had reduced the amount of arable land, but the government is combating desertification and erosion in various ways. However, soil erosion continues in the 21st century and is forecast to increase with climate change, with about 30% occurring on agricultural land. Degraded soil could be improved.Soil surveys have been done at least since the 1950s, and the Ministry of Agriculture has published soil maps.

The Turkish Foundation for Combating Soil Erosion is a non-governmental organization as is the Soil Science Society of Turkey. A 2016 study said soil had been degraded and that there was great potential to sequester carbon. There is a soil database (Toprak Bilge Sistem) but it is not public. Increasing soil organic carbon (SOC) in agricultural soils is important, and in 2017 total SOC down to 0.7 m was estimated at 9.23 Pg. Another estimate is slightly under 3000 tonnes/km^{2}. SOC is being measured and mapped. Accumulation of soil organic matter depends partly on cultivation but can be hindered by aridity.

Steppe grassland is mostly in Central and southeast Anatolia. Above 2000m in the Black Sea Region there is Alpine grassland.

The distribution of plants uses the World Geographical Scheme for Recording Plant Distributions (WGSRPD). See List of codes used in the World Geographical Scheme for Recording Plant Distributions for its coding system. Turkey is divided into two botanical areas:

- TUE – Turkey in Europe – part of 13 Southeastern Europe – part of 1 Europe → Category:Flora of European Turkey
- TUR – (the rest of) Turkey – part of 34 Western Asia – part of 3 Temperate-Asia → Category:Flora of Turkey

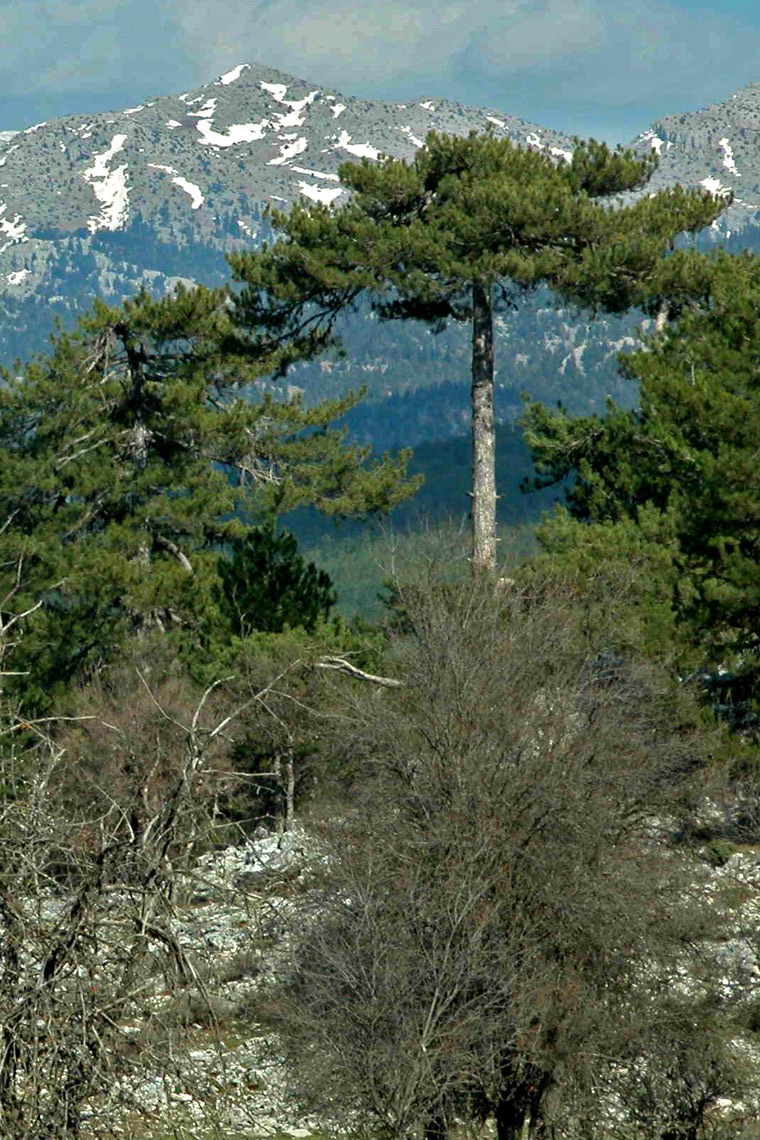
Pinus nigra forms extensive stands in the central Taurus Mts.— between Akseki and Bademli, 1360 m s.l.

The Pontic mountain range along the north Anatolian coast is a more or less continuous barrier against humid air from the Black Sea, causing high precipitation on the northern slopes of the Pontus all year. Climatic conditions on the northern coast therefore resemble those in central Europe and so does the vegetation. A limited Mediterranean influence is noticeable only on a very narrow coastal strip, but almost completely missing in the northeast. In the lower forest zone often Hornbeam (Carpinus betulus) prevails, frequently intermingled with Sweet Chestnut (Castanea sativa). Further up Oriental Beech (Fagus orientalis) and/or Nordmann Fir (Abies nordmanniana) form extensive forests. Humidity becomes extremely high in Lazistan, where the Pontic barrier culminates in the nearly 4000 m high Kaçkar Mountains. East of Trabzon therefore vegetation becomes somewhat sub-tropic, with a lot of evergreens in the forest and tea plantations everywhere on the slopes.

South of the Pontic watershed the climate immediately gets drier. In the mountains first Abies nordmanniana, but then soon Pinus becomes dominant. In the western parts of Anatolia this is often Black Pine (Pinus nigra), in the east nearly exclusively Scots Pine (Pinus sylvestris). Penetrating further into the central parts of inner Anatolia leads to still dryer, winter cold conditions. Today the lower parts of central Anatolia are virtually treeless. Fields on deep alluvial soils alternate with steppe on the dryer hills. But it is still an open question where and to what degree this central Anatolian steppe is due to aridity or to human deforestation. Aridity is most pronounced around Tuz Gölü south of Ankara and in the Aras-valley near the Armenian border. Between Kağizman and Tuzluca this valley is so dry, that here and there pure salt deposits glitter like white snowfields on the bare slopes.

The Taurus Mountains form the southern edge of the central Anatolian Plateau and are already very influenced by the Mediterranean, with a lot of snow in winter, but dry and warm summers. Climax forests are formed by Black Pine, Cilician Fir (Abies cilicica) and Lebanon Cedar (Cedrus libani). Unfortunately, there has been a lot of deforestation in the Taurus, most gravely affecting the stands of cedar. On the Aegean and Mediterranean coasts pronounced Mediterranean conditions prevail, with very hot and dry summers and very rainy winters. Antalya Province has considerably more total precipitation than, for example, the south of England (1071 mm versus 759 mm), but its seasonal distribution is completely different and the average temperature is of course much higher (18.3 °C versus 9.7°). But due to massive forest destruction hills and slopes in coastal West and South Anatolia are nowadays mostly covered with maquis shrubland. Where fertile alluvial soils prevail, e.g. in the Cilician Plain around Adana, there is intense agriculture.

Mediterranean vegetation is resilient to drought.

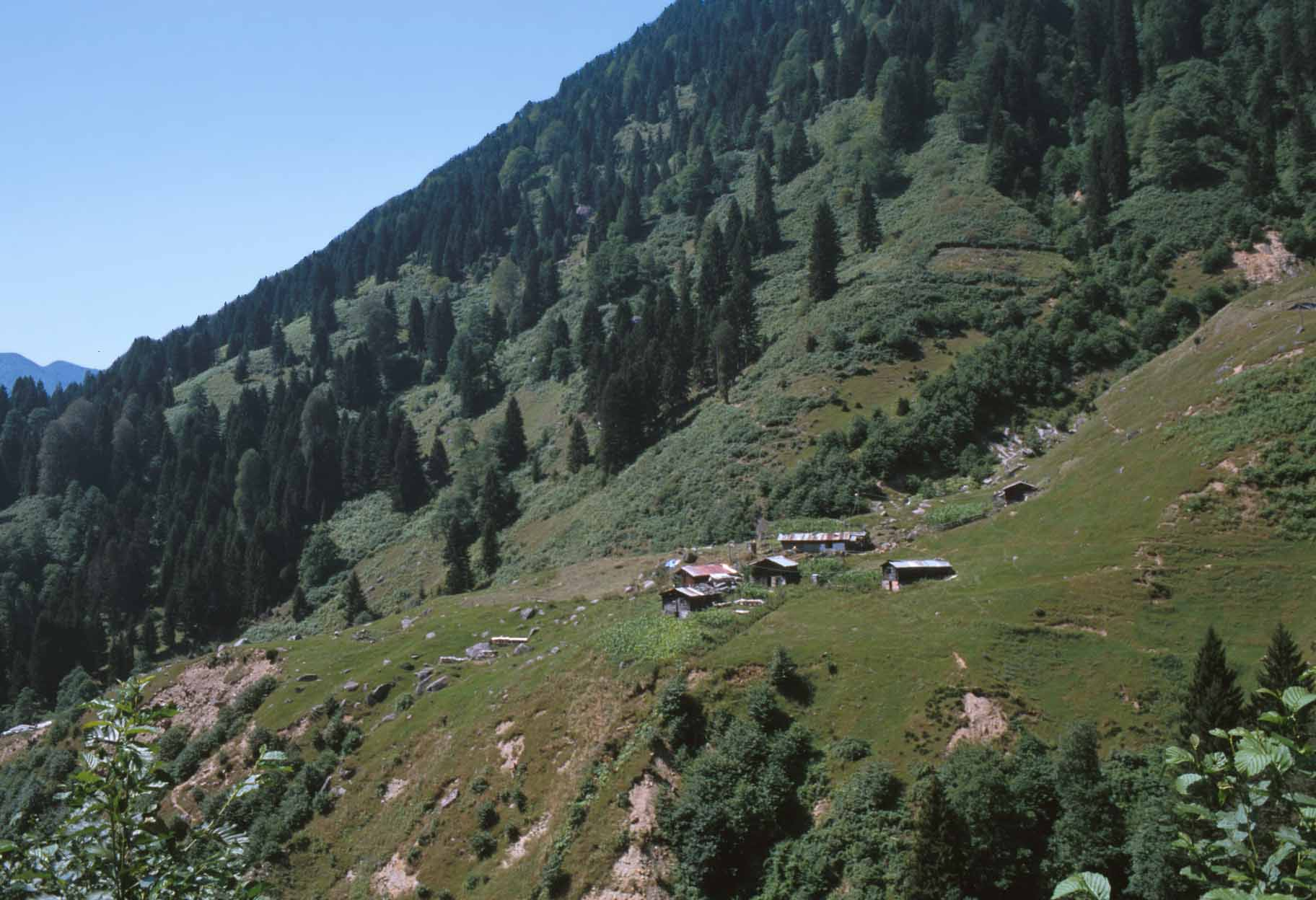
Picea orientalis with Abies nordmanniana and Fagus orientalis on the moist northern slopes of Kaçkar Dağ (Northeastern Pontus). Main component of the scrub between the trees is Rhododendron luteum, above Ayder, c.1700 m s.l.

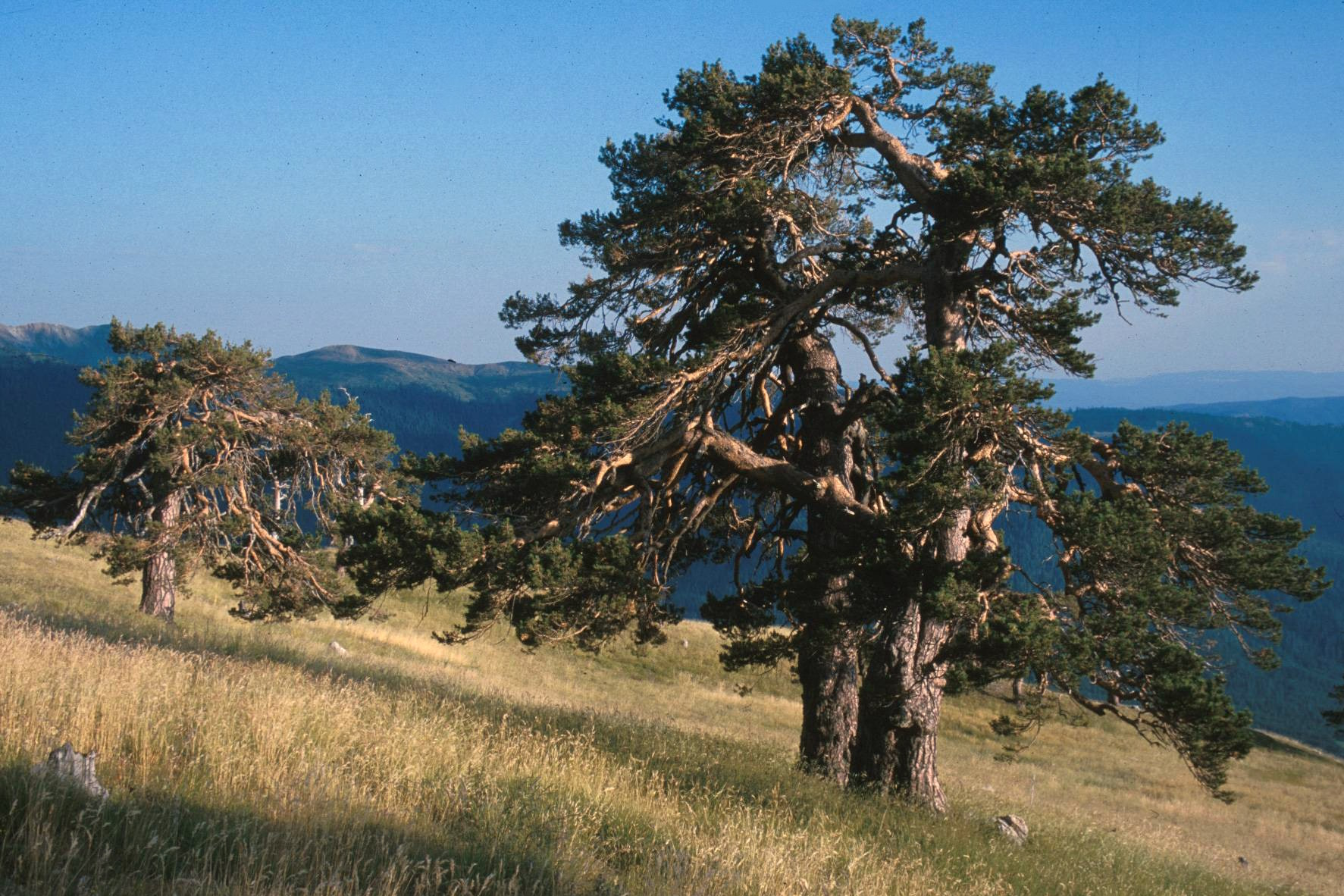
Scots Pine (Pinus sylvestris) is the dominant tree in the dry and cold areas of north-eastern Anatolia, southern slope of Kücükhacet Dağ (Ilgaz Dağ), c.1950 m s. l.

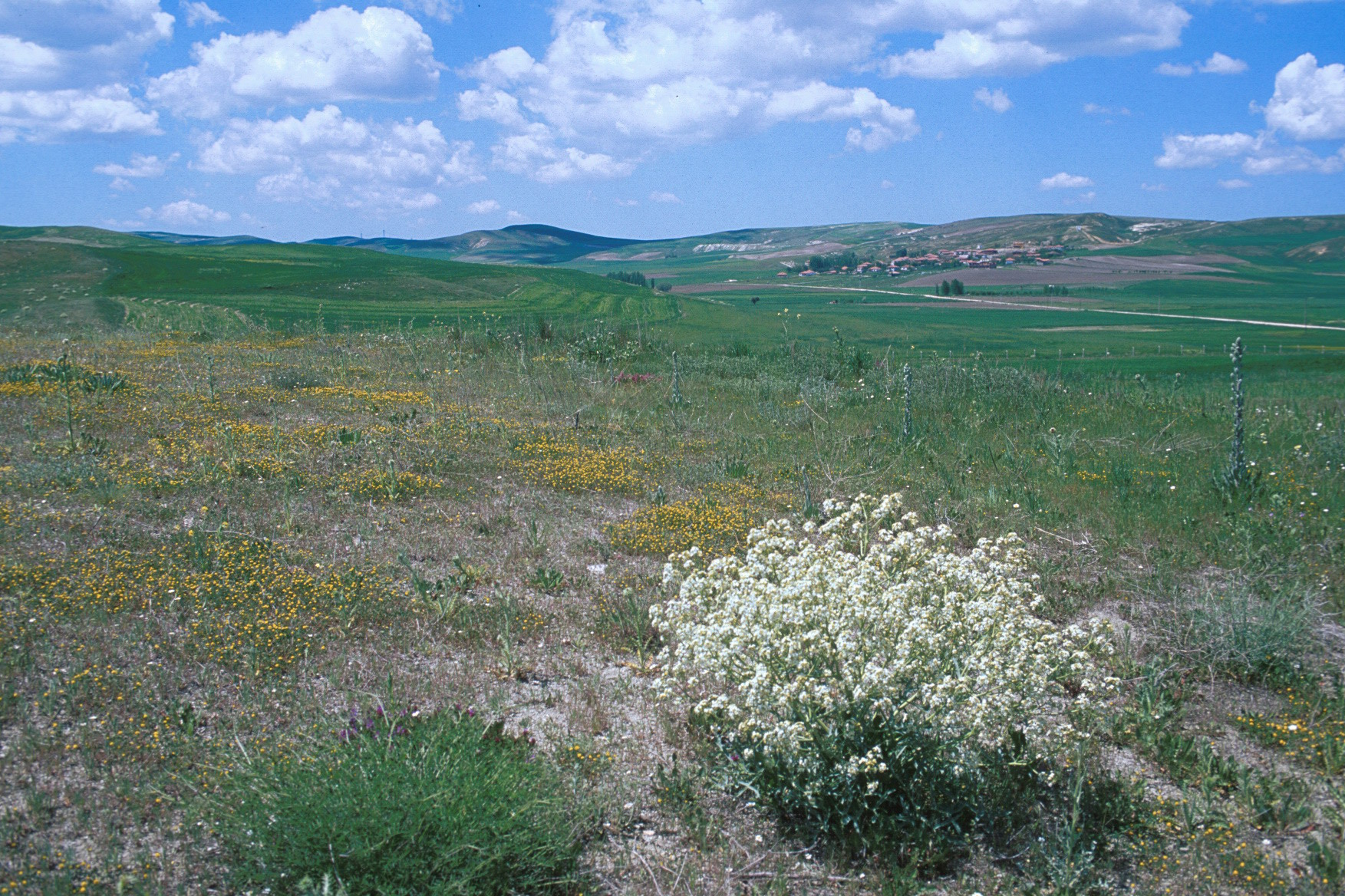
Rest of the Anatolian steppe with Crambe tatarica (white), with fields in the background, Ahiboz, c.35 km south of Ankara, c.1000 m s.l.

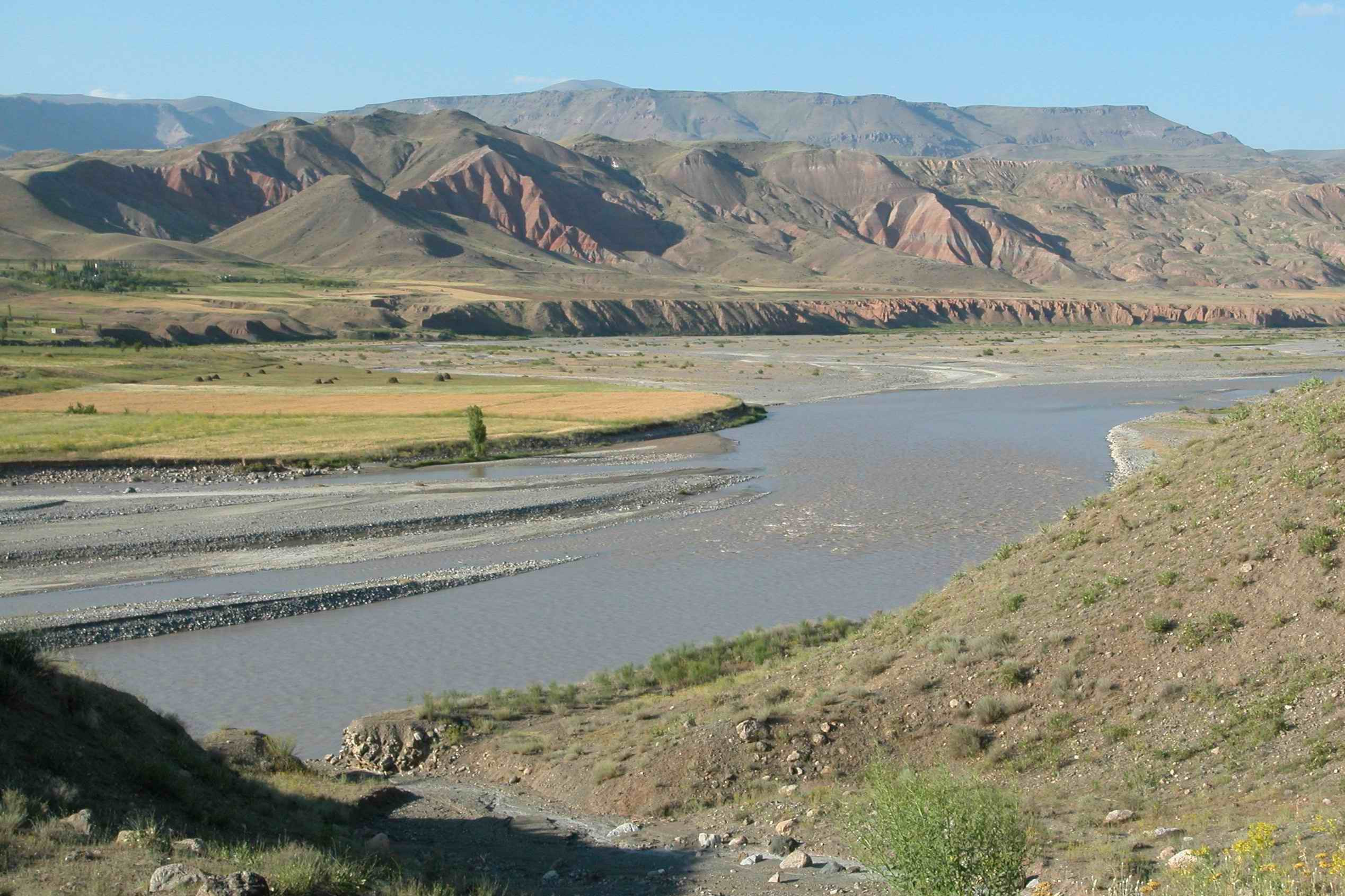
Semidesert vegetation in the Aras-valley near the Armenian border. Sparse plant cover consists mainly of drought- and salt-tolerant members of the Goosefoot Family (Chenopodiaceae), 35 km west of Tuzluca, 1110 m s.l.

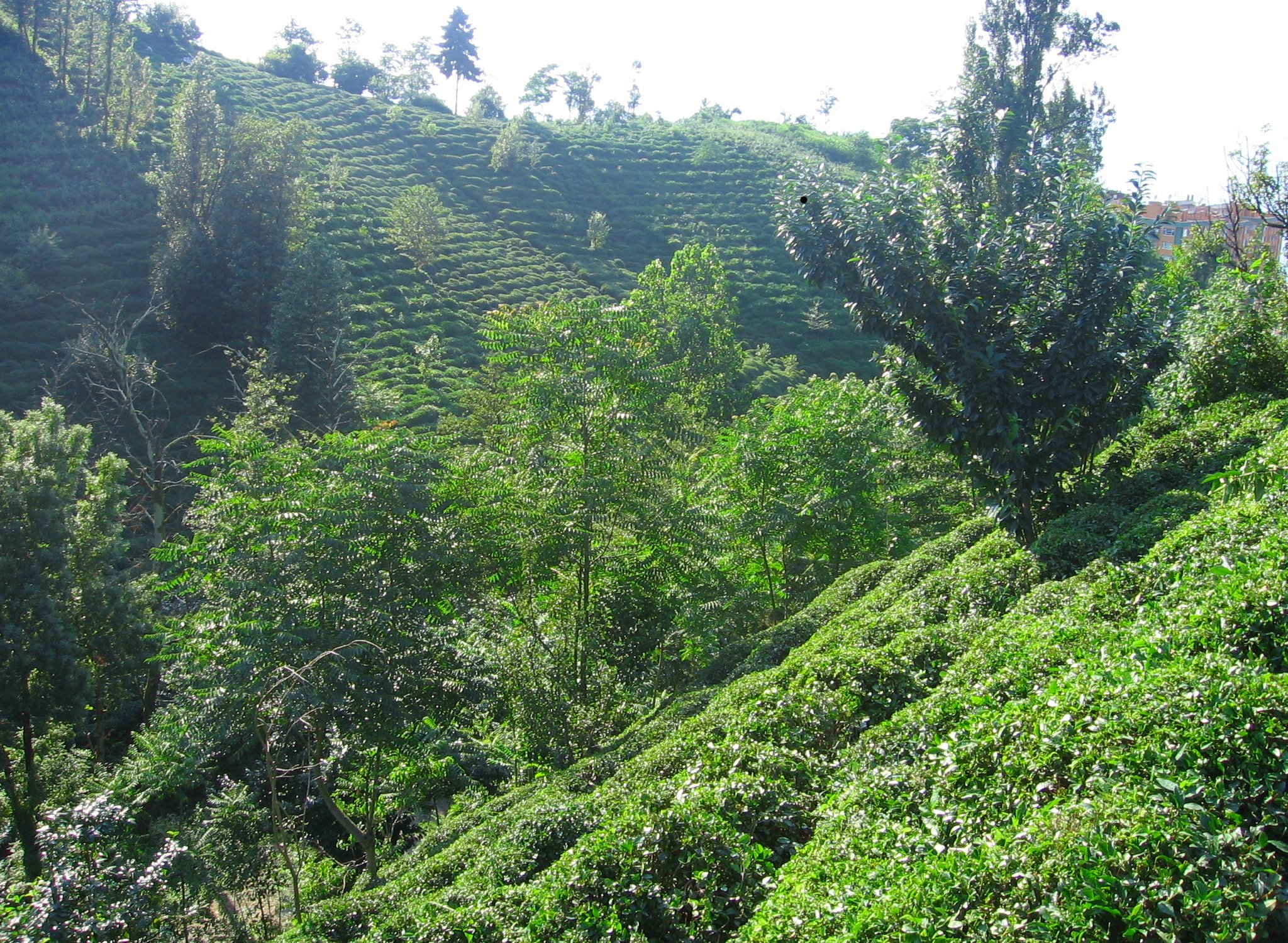
In Turkey the cultivation of tea is confined to the almost subtropical part of the Black Sea coast around Rize, Ikizdere valley south of Rize, 200 m s.l.

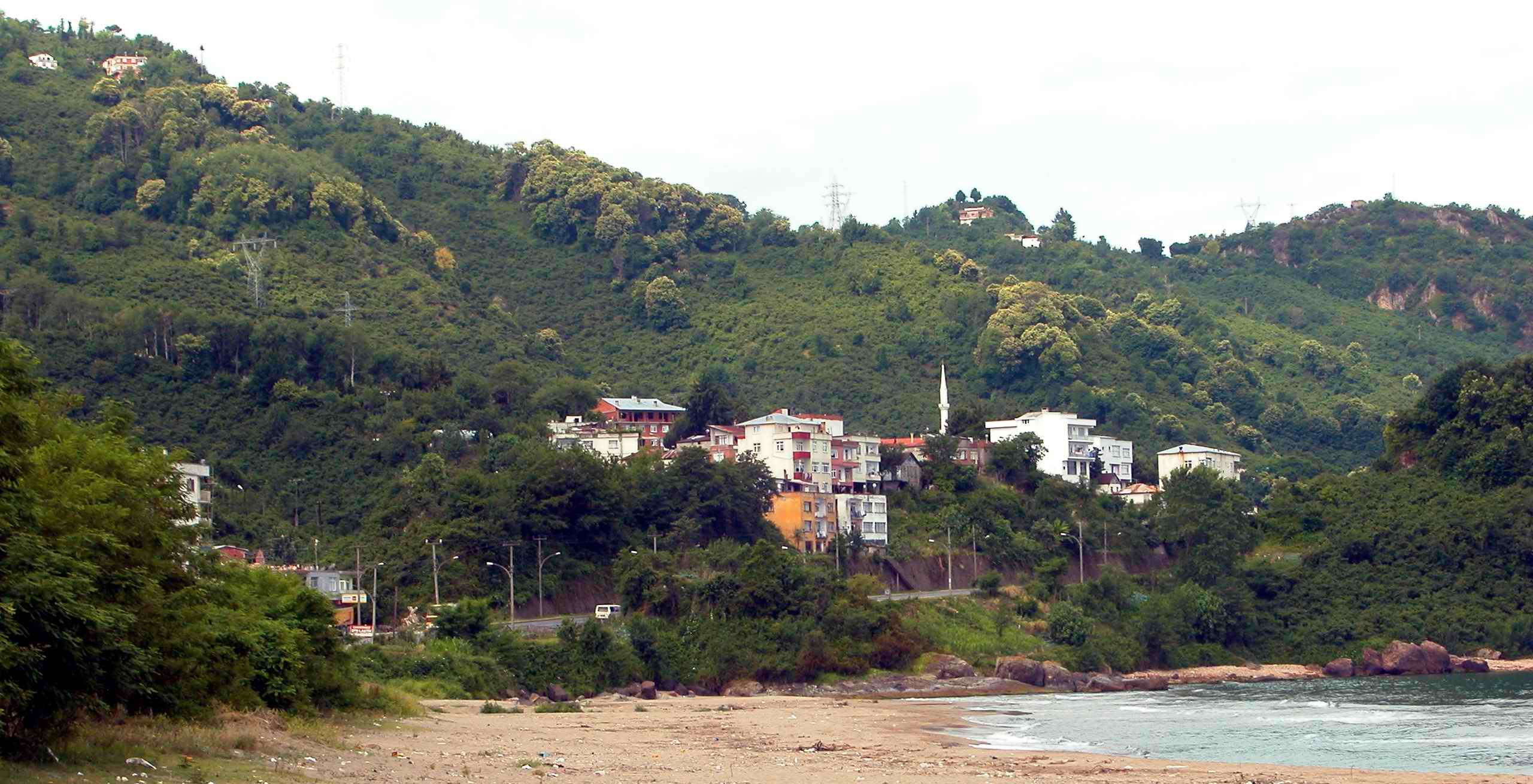
Orchards with hazelnuts (Corylus maxima) are very typical for the mountainous parts of the Anatolian Black Sea coast. East of Trabzon they give way to tea plantations, near Tirebolu (Giresun-Province), c. 20 m s. l.

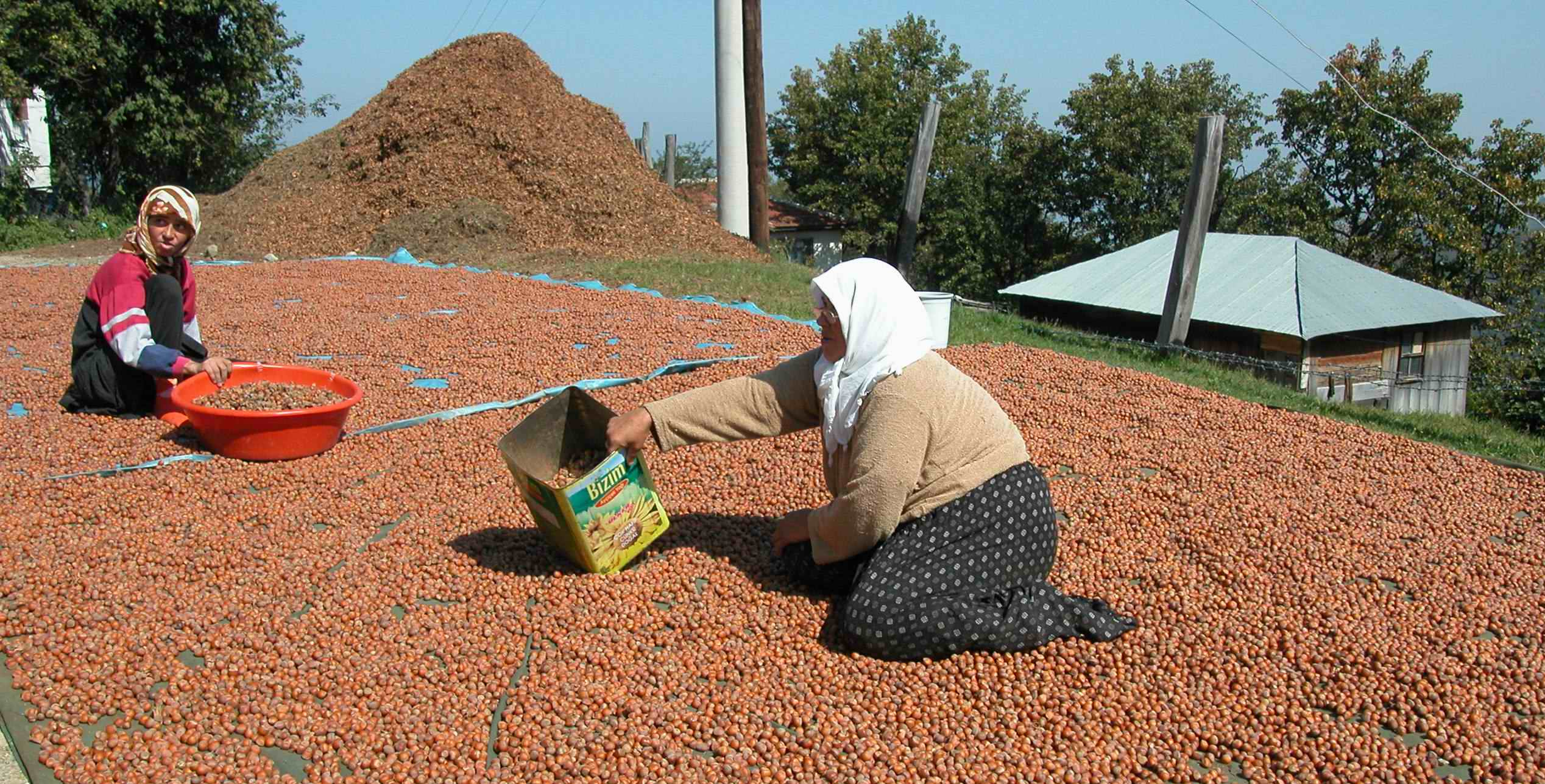
Turkish women drying hazelnuts, Sacmalipinar Düzce Province.

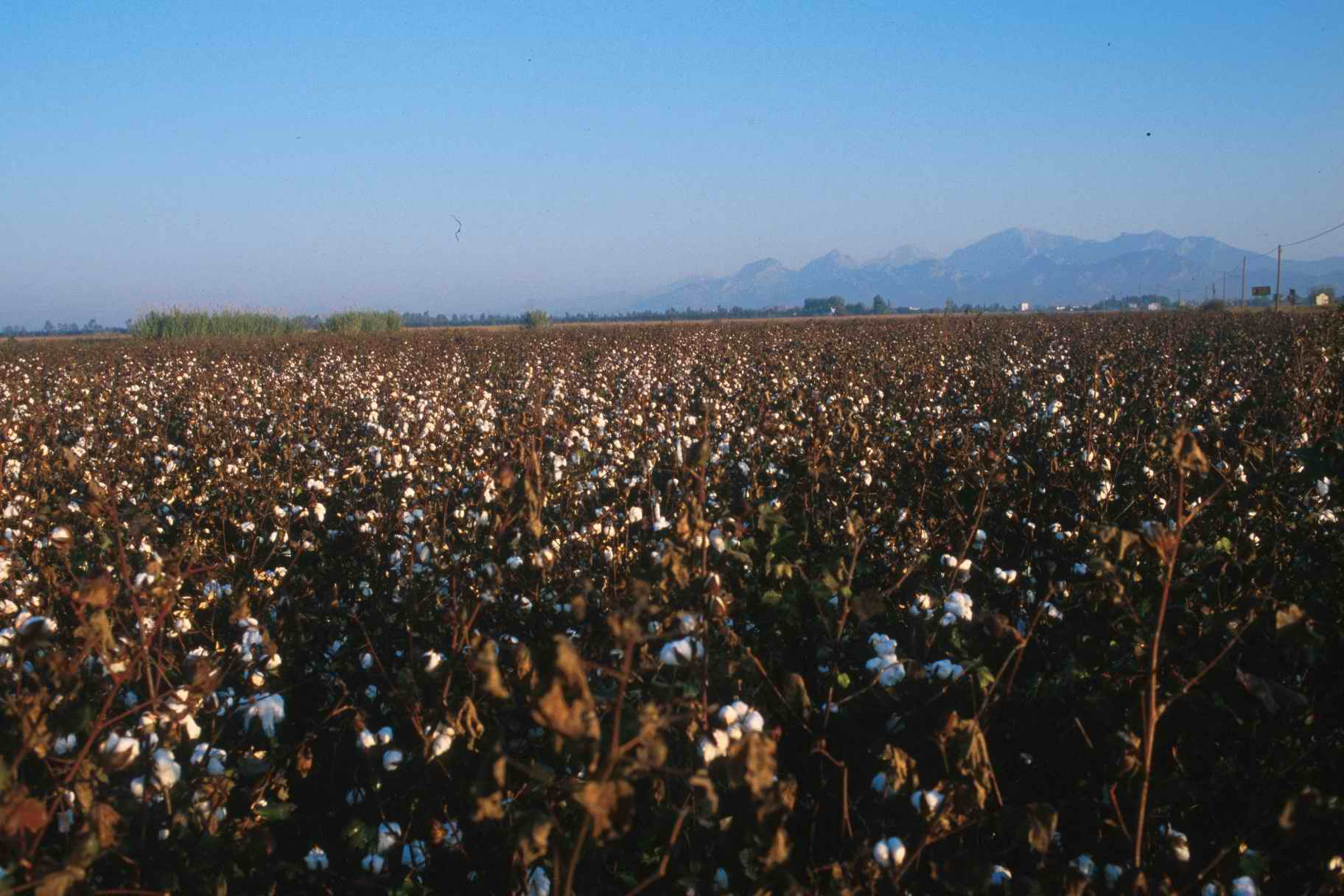
Cotton grows best in hot, sunny regions but needs plenty of water, near Belek (Antalya-Province).

== Origins and evolution ==
As local endemics take a long time to evolve, we also have to compare the history of the central and north European mountains with the Anatolian ones. During each of the glacial periods the former were covered by thick shields of permanent ice, which destroyed most pre-glacial endemism and hindered neo-endemics from forming. Only less glaciated, peripheral areas, the so-called “massifs de refuge”, offered suitable conditions for the survival of local endemics during glacial periods.

In Anatolia the Pleistocene glaciations only covered the highest peaks, so there are many species with small ranges. In other words: Anatolia as a whole is a big "massif de refuge", showing all degrees of past and recent speciation.

== Human impact ==
Without humans the main vegetation types would be steppe and forest. Rangeland in Central Anatolia was overgrazed, and rangeland management to limit soil erosion has been suggested. There is a national biodiversity action plan to 2028, and an IUCN SSC Turkey Plant Red List Authority. Potentially there could be more forest in Turkey. Technology is being used to revegetate steep slopes to try to prevent desertification.

== Botanical resources ==
- "The Flora of Turkey and the East Aegean Islands", 9 volumes, 1965-1985, ed. P H Davis, followed by two supplementary volumes 10 (1988) & 11 (2000, Güner, A. & al.). All volumes are in English, mostly text.
- "Resimli Türkiye Florası" (Illustrated Flora of Turkey), projected to be 30 volumes, ed. Adil Güner, released in PDF and print format, currently published (May 2024) vols. 1,2,3a,3b,4a,4b, primarily distributed via ANG. All volumes are in Turkish, with keys, descriptive text, illustrations and details and map of herbarium specimens used for each taxon.
- "Check-list of additional taxa to the supplement of flora of Turkey I... X" are 10 (as of May 2024) supplemental lists of new taxa that have been found in Turkey (released as PDFs).
- "Orchids of Europe, North Africa and the Middle East, ed 3", 2006, 640 pp, by Pierre Delforge (English, includes the entirety of Turkey).
- "Endemism in Mainland Regions – Case Studies: Turkey", 2013, by Pils, p. 240-255 in: Endemism in Vascular Plants, Springer Verlag, ed. C Hobohm
- Turkish Journal Of Botany

AVCI. M. 2005. "Çeşitlilik Ve Endemizm Açısından Türkiye’nin Bitki Örtüsü-Diversity and endemism in Turkey's Vegetation", İstanbul Üniversitesi Edebiyat Fakültesi Coğrafya Bölümü Coğrafya Dergisi 13:27-55.

Information for this article was taken mainly from: Flowers of Turkey - a photo guide.- 448 pp.– Eigenverlag Gerhard Pils (2006).
