= Lesbian (disambiguation) =

A lesbian is a homosexual woman or girl.

Lesbian may also refer to:

- An inhabitant of Lesbos, a Greek island in the Aegean Sea
- Lesbian Greek dialect, an Aeolic Greek dialect
- Lesbian rule, a flexible mason's rule made of lead
- Lesbian wine, wine from the island of Lesbos
- SS Lesbian, a name given to three ships
- "Lesbian", a 2018 song by Metro Boomin from Not All Heroes Wear Capes

== See also ==
- Lesbia (disambiguation)
- Sapphic (disambiguation)
