= Sappho (ship) =

Several vessels have been named Sappho for the Greek poet Sappho:

- Sappho (1785 ship) was launched at Shields in 1785. She spent most of her career trading with the Baltic, though she made some voyages elsewhere, and in particular, between 1788 and 1799 she made a voyage to the Falkland Islands as a whaler. She was last listed in 1798, having perhaps been captured in late 1797.
- Sappho (1805 ship) was launched in France circa 1803, probably under another name, and captured in 1804. She became a West Indiaman and then privateer that the French Navy recaptured and destroyed in March 1808.
- Sappho (1810 ship) was launched in Sunderland. She traded widely, first as a West Indiaman and later to the Baltic. She also made one voyage to India, sailing under a licence from the British East India Company (EIC). She stranded on 9 July 1823, was gotten off, condemned, and sold.
- Sappho (1813 ship) was launched at Whitby and moved her registration to London in 1814. Thereafter she traded widely. She made to voyages to India, one to Bombay and one to Bengal, sailing under a licence from the British East India Company (EIC). She was last listed in 1833.

== See also ==
- French ship Sapho – one of several ships of the French Navy
- HMS Sappho – one of five vessels of the Royal Navy, and two planned vessels
- USS Sappho – either of two vessels of the United States Navy
