= Neor Lake =

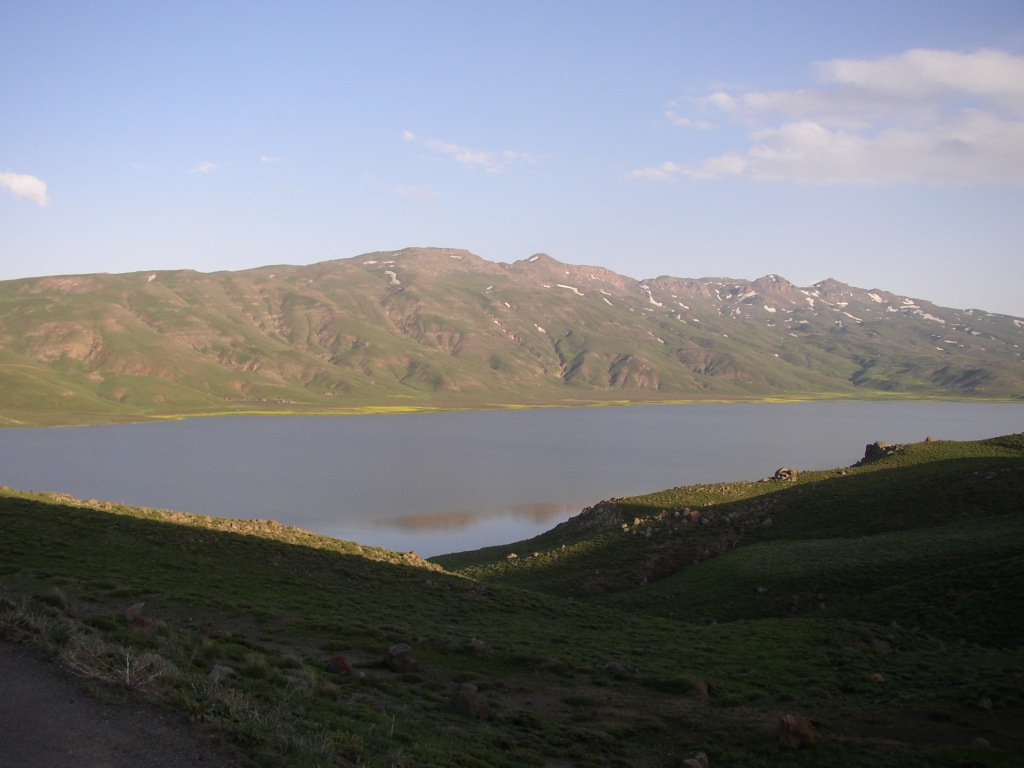
- Neor Lake

- Location within Iran
- Interactive map of Neor Lake
- Location: Ardabil Province
- Coordinates: 37°59′57.2″N 48°33′50.5″E
- Type: Natural Lake
- Basin countries: Iran
- Surface area: 220 hectares (540 acres)
- Average depth: 3 metres (9.8 ft)
- Max. depth: 5.5 metres (18 ft)

Neor Lake (Persian: دریاچه نِئور) is a shallow lake located in 48 km from Ardabil in Ardabil Province in the Baghru mountain range in North West Iran. This lake was formed due to two fault zones during the Eocene period.

== Geography ==
The lake is situated at the lower slopes of Baghru Heights of the Talysch Mountains. Elevation of the lake is 2,500 metres (8,200 ft) above mean sea level. It is 48 kilometres (30 mi) to the south east of Ardabil on Khalkhal Road out of which 18 kilometres (11 mi) is a hill section. The lake emerged during the Eocene geologic time scale. The Neor fault and another fault on the western part of the lake, which were active from the Eocene period, have contributed to the emergence of this lake. The basin receives an annual rainfall of 400 millimetres (16 in) with cold mountainous climate.

== Features ==
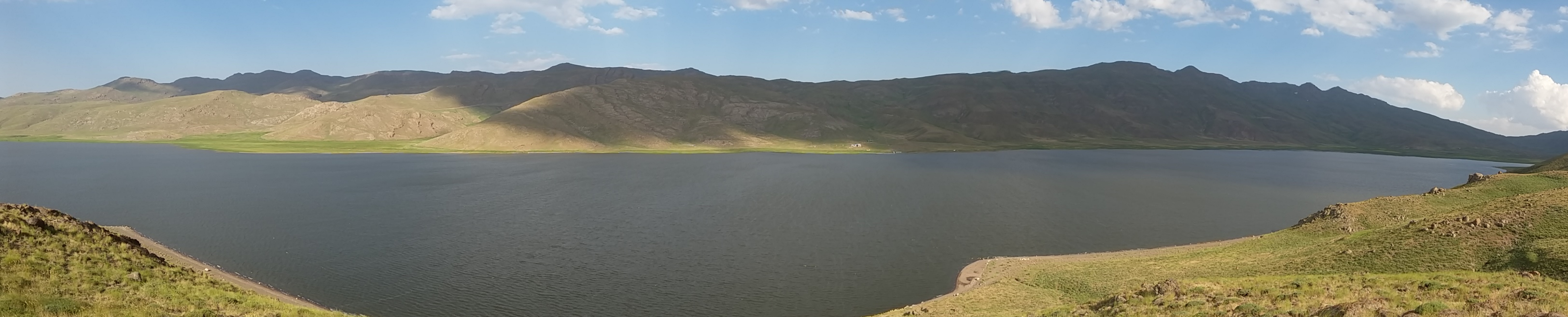
Neor Lake, North of Talesh

The lake has a water spread area of 220 hectares (540 acres) and is a "seasonally recharged body of water formed over a tectonic depression on the leeward flank of the Talesh (Alborz) Mountains in North West Iran". It is formed of two lakes, one small and another large, which merge during the rainy season when the depth of the lake is 5.5 metres (18 ft). The average depth of the lake is about 3 metres (9.8 ft). Heavy siltation has occurred in the lake due to high rainfall incidence, irrigation releases, the physio-chemical reactions, and slope gradient of less than 35%, causing erosion; these factors have resulted in a tropic state of the lake.

The lake contains fish species of rainbow trout; fingerlings were introduced with the objective of practicing commercial and sports fishing. Fingerlings are introduced into the lake every year to promote fishery practices. The fish feed on the Gammarus fasciatus found in the lake bed and grow into robust pink-coloured fish. Among the fauna species found in the lake area are ruddy shelduck, and swallows which are the migrant species.

== Research findings ==
A sample of peat deposit (30 centimetres (12 in) in diameter core sample) from the bed of the lake, from its northeastern corner, was taken by coring. This was subject to studies to determine the age of the stratification and the type of biodiversity which existed when it was formed. The pollen spectra revealed a 6,500 year old sequence comprising remnants of pollen and beetle. Coprophagous and coprophilous species of pollen were identified. The studies indicated an "open steppe landscape", akin to the present day Irano-Turanian (IT) floristic region in the highlands, in respect of agro-pastoral cultural vocations and the closeness to the eastern mesic temperate Hyrcanian forest. The insect and pollen evidence conforms to the archaeological evidence in the region. Chironomid and geochemical analyses on the lake Neor highlight hydrologic variations on the lake since the Lateglacial with alternation of drier and wetter period.

== Gallery ==
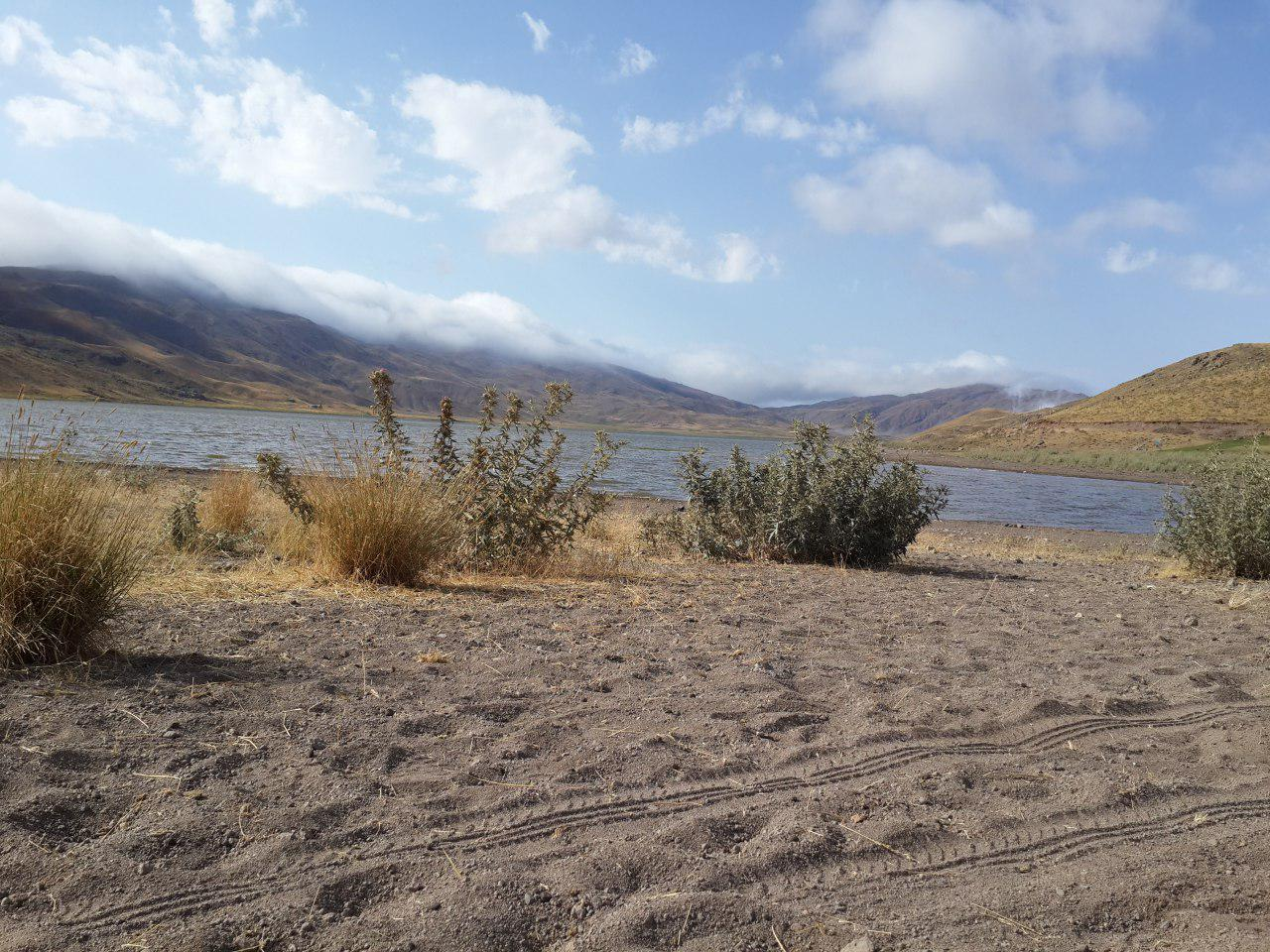

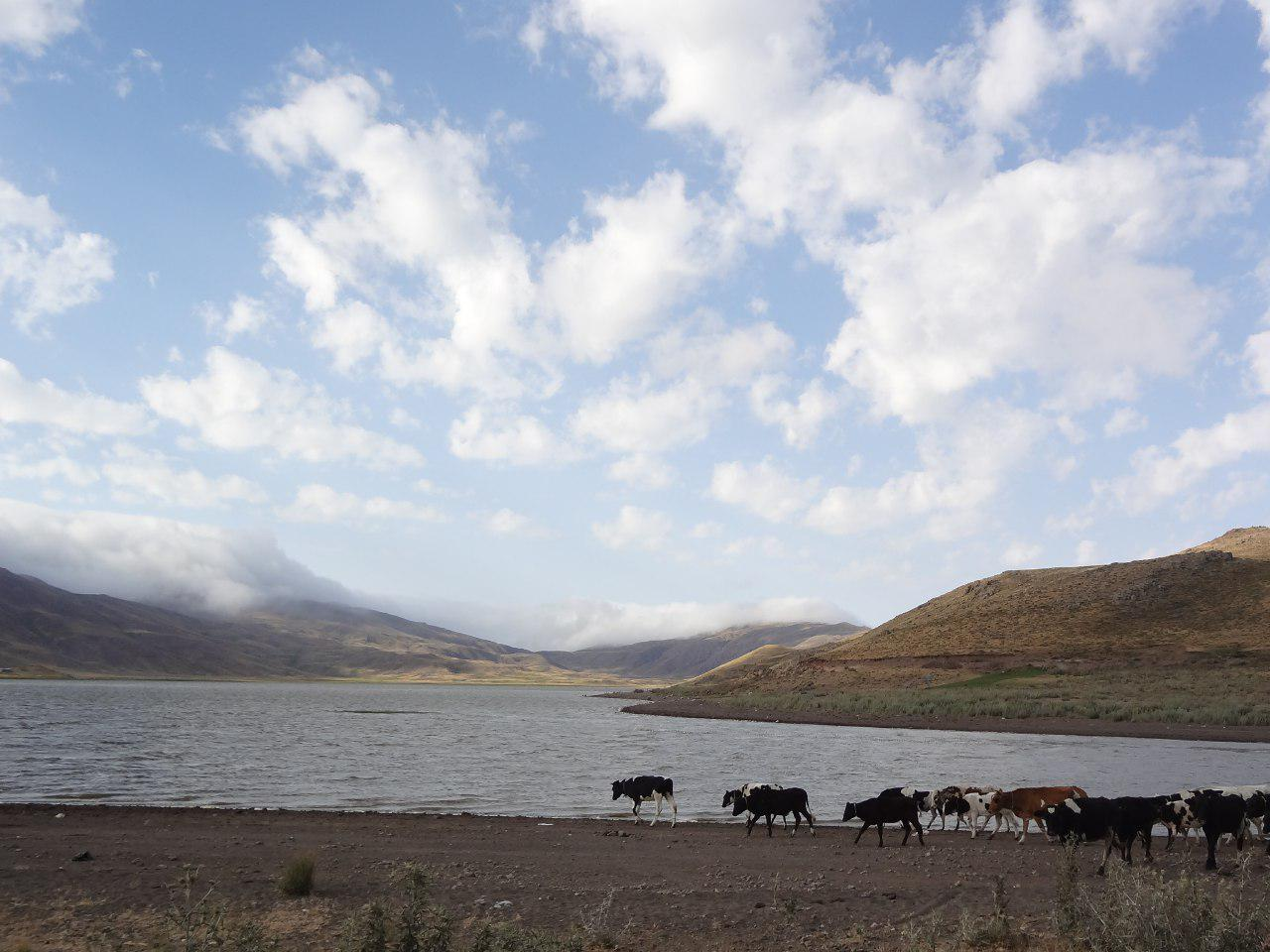
