= Psappha =

Psappha may refer to:

- Sappho (c. 630–c. 570 BCE), Greek poet
- Psappha (Xenakis), a 1975 composition for solo percussion by Iannis Xenakis, named after the poet
- Psappha New Music Ensemble, a contemporary music ensemble, named after the Xenakis composition

== See also ==
- Sappho (disambiguation)
