= Irano-Anatolian =

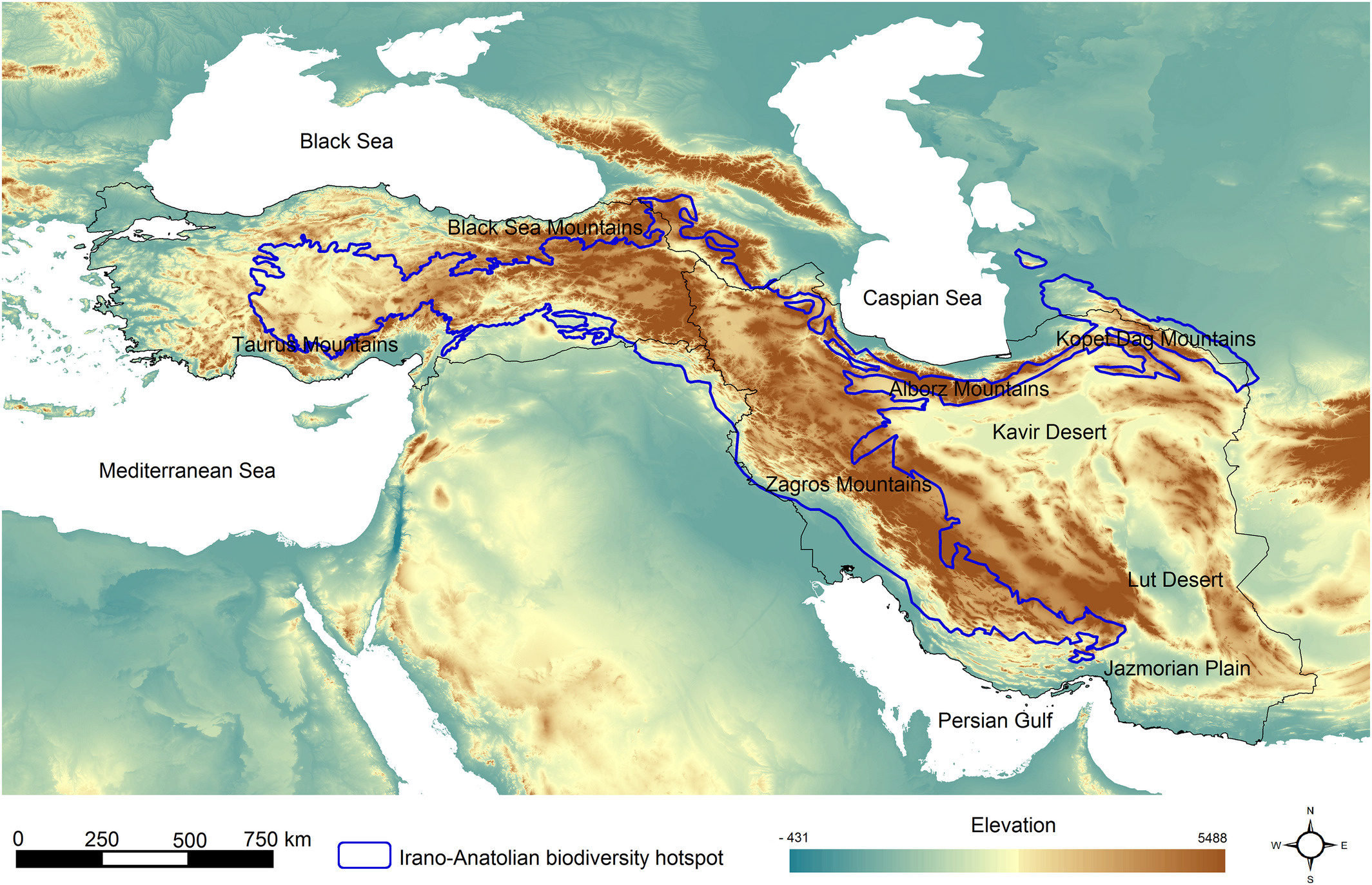
The Irano-Anatolian biodiversity hotspot

The Irano-Anatolian region is a biodiversity hotspot designated by Conservation International's Critical Ecosystem Partnership Fund, extending across portions of Armenia, Azerbaijan, Georgia, Iraq, Iran, Turkey, and Turkmenistan. This hotspot covers the South-West portion of the Irano-Turanian floristic region, connecting the Mediterranean Basin with Western Asia.

It includes highlands of the central and eastern Anatolian Plateau as well as the Zagros, Alborz, and Kopet Dag mountain ranges.

The ecoregions included within the hotspot are:

- Central Anatolian steppe
- Central Anatolian deciduous forests
- Eastern Anatolian deciduous forests
- Eastern Anatolian montane steppe
- Elburz Range forest steppe
- Kopet Dag woodlands and forest steppe
- Zagros Mountains forest steppe
