= Catocala lesbia =

Scientific classification
- Kingdom: Animalia
- Phylum: Arthropoda
- Class: Insecta
- Order: Lepidoptera
- Superfamily: Noctuoidea
- Family: Erebidae
- Genus: Catocala
- Species: C. lesbia

Binomial name
- Catocala lesbia Christoph, 1887

Species of moth

Catocala lesbia is a moth of the family Erebidae first described by Hugo Theodor Christoph in 1887. It is found in the Middle East, in regions without severe winters. In Turkey, south-east of the Anatolian Plateau, in oases and desert foothills in Iraq, south as far as the Sinai and Egypt. In Israel it is found in the Jordan Rift Valley and Negev.

Adults are on wing from June to September depending on the location. There is one generation per year in most of its range. There are two generations in Iraq.

The larvae feed on Populus euphratica.

== Subspecies ==
- Catocala lesbia lesbia
- Catocala lesbia fittkaui Kravchenko, et al., 2008 (Waziristan, Pakistan)
