= Saffo =

Saffo may refer to:

- Saffo (Mayr), 1794 opera by Mayr
- Saffo (Pacini), 1840 opera by Pacini
- Saffo in Leucade, by Francesco Morlacchi (1784–1841)
- Paul Saffo (born 1954), American technology forecaster
- Saffo the Greek, American organised crime figure, early 20th century
- Saffo Music, 1977 album by Lara Saint Paul
- Bill Saffo, Mayor of Wilmington, North Carolina

== See also ==
- Balcha Safo (1863–1936), Ethiopian general, alternative spelling
- Sapho (disambiguation)
- Sappho, Greek poet
- Sappho (disambiguation)
