= Sapphic =

Sapphic may refer to:

- Sappho, Greek poet of the 7th century BC who wrote about her attraction to women
  - Sapphic stanza, a four line poetic form
- Sapphism, an inclusive umbrella term for romantic/sexual attraction or relationships between women, regardless of orientation
- Sapphic literature, literary subgenre for works featuring relationships between women

== See also ==
- Sappho (disambiguation)
- Lesbian (disambiguation)
