= Fauna of Turkey =

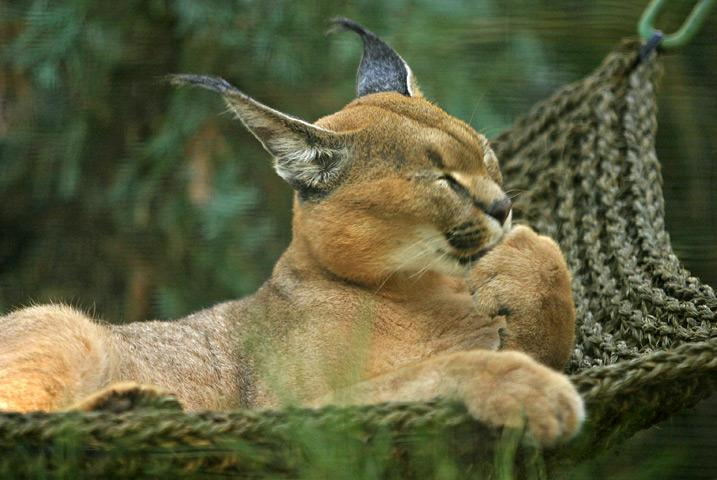
Caracal, one of Turkey's wild cats

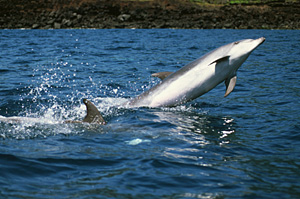
Common bottlenose dolphin

The fauna of Turkey is abundant and varied. The wildlife of Turkey includes a great diversity of plants and animals, each suited to its own particular habitat, as it is a large country with many geographic and climatic regions. About 1,500 species of vertebrates have been recorded in the country and around 19,000 species of invertebrates. The country is a biological crossroads with links to Europe, Asia, and the Near East. Many birds use the country as a staging post during migration.

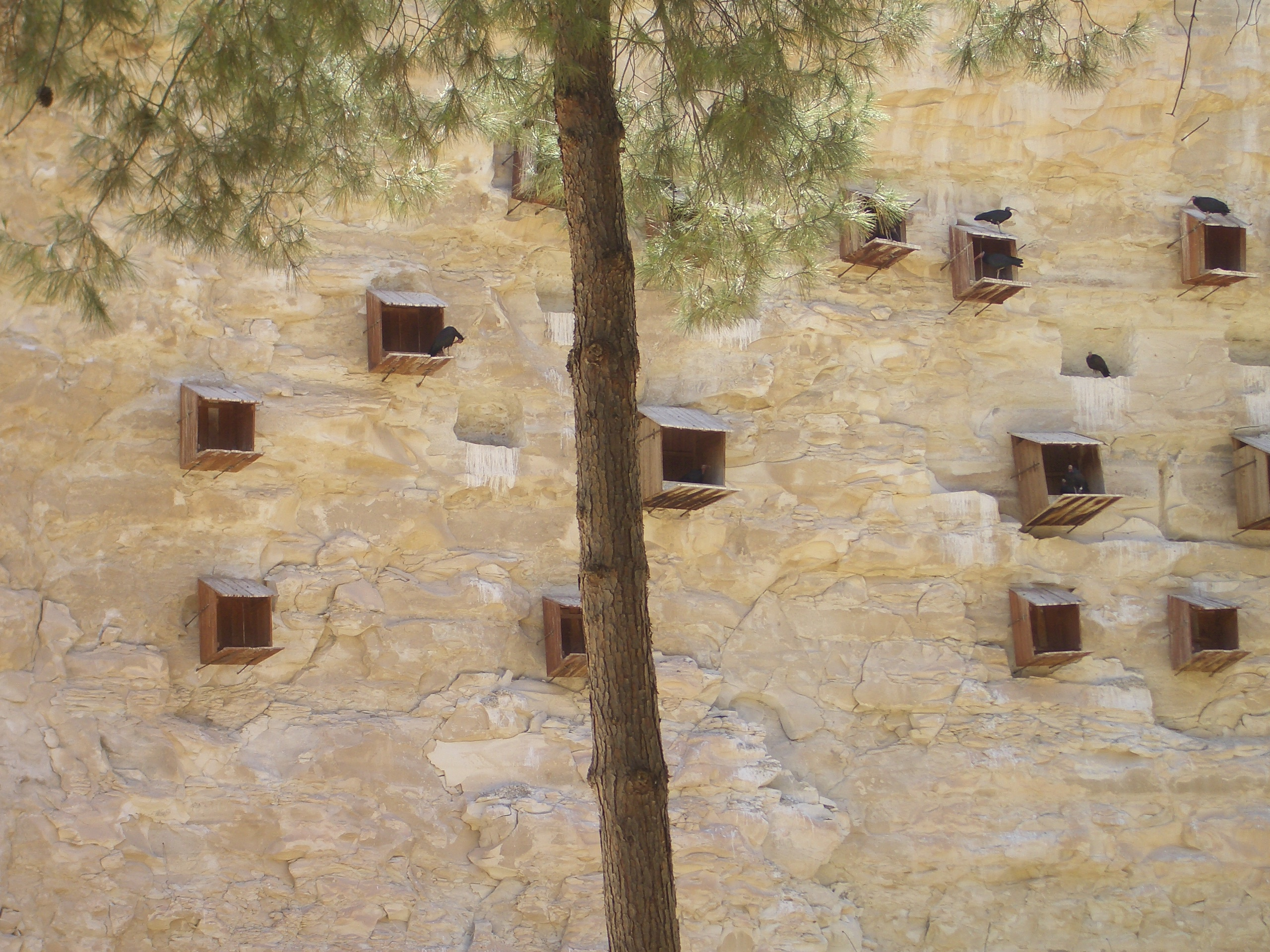
Human-made nests for northern bald ibises in Birecik

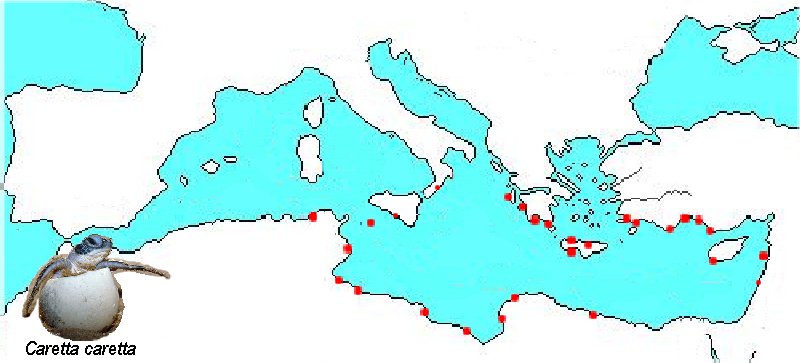
Loggerhead sea turtle nesting places by the Mediterranean Sea

== Overview ==
Turkey has a large range of habitat types and a great faunal diversity. Nearly 1,500 vertebrate species were recorded, of which over 100 species, mostly fish, are endemic. The country is on two major bird migration routes. This increases the number of birds in the country in spring and autumn. The invertebrate fauna is also very diverse, with about 19,000 species being recorded including 4,000 which are endemic.

== Invertebrates ==
=== Insects ===
There are over 380 species of ants in Turkey, 38 of which are endemic.

== Vertebrates ==
=== Amphibians ===
Twenty-three species are endemic to Turkey.

=== Reptiles ===
Twenty-three species are endemic to Turkey.

=== Mammals ===
Eight species are endemic to Turkey. Many species have declined in numbers, for example chamois, gazelle and mouflon, with shortage of staff to protect them claimed to be a factor. DNA of 15 endangered large mammals will be stored.

=== Fish ===
A 2026 national checklist recognized 390 freshwater fish species in Türkiye, comprising 367 native species and 23 established non-native species. Of the native fauna, 202 species, or about 55%, were classified as endemic to the country. Endemic richness is not distributed evenly among drainage basins; the Antalya drainage contained the highest number of endemic species in the checklist, with 28, while overall species richness ranged from 11 species in the Van Basin to 65 in the Sakarya drainage.

== Conservation ==
Conservation action plans for 100 species are due to be completed by the end of 2019.

== Endangered species ==
- Mediterranean monk seal (critically endangered) – less than 500 individuals all around the world
- Northern bald ibis (critically endangered) – main groups live in Morocco and Turkey
- Asia Minor spiny mouse (critically endangered)
- Rana holtzi, toros frog (critically endangered) – endemic to Turkey
- Pseudophoxinus maeandricus, Sandıklı spring minnow, (critically endangered) – known from a single stream
- Anatolian leopard (endangered)
- White-headed duck (endangered)
- Red-breasted goose (endangered)
- Loggerhead sea turtle (endangered)
- Great bustard (vulnerable)
- Dalmatian pelican (vulnerable)
- Lesser kestrel (vulnerable)
- Egyptian vulture (vulnerable)
- Wild goat (vulnerable)
- Greater spotted eagle (vulnerable)
- Steppe eagle (endangered)
- Eastern imperial eagle (vulnerable)
- Saker falcon (vulnerable)

== Extinct and locally extinct fauna ==
The following species and populations have become extinct in Turkey in historical times.

- African darter, due to the drying up of Lake Amik
- Asiatic lion
- Caspian tiger, the last known individual was shot in 1974 in Hakkari Province
- Hydruntine, extinct species of wild ass, last seen in the 1st millennium BC
- Alburnus akili, extinct species of fish formerly native to Lake Beyşehir, last seen in 1998, likely became extinct due to the introduction of invasive fish species
- Pseudophoxinus handlirschi, extinct fish found in Lake Eğirdir, last seen in the 1980s, likely due to the introduction of invasive zander

The Küre and Kaçkar Mountains national parks have been suggested for rewilding.

== See also ==
- Fauna of Europe
- Fauna of Asia
- Feral cats in Istanbul
- Animal name changes in Turkey
