= Sapho =

Sapho may refer to:

- Sapho (damselfly), genus of insects
- SAPHO syndrome, chronic disease with synovitis, acne, pustulosis, hyperostosis and osteitis

== People ==
- Madeleine de Scudéry (1607–1701), French writer who used the pseudonym Sapho
- Sapho (singer) (born 1950), French singer

== Arts ==
- Sapho (Gounod), 1851 opera by Charles Gounod
- Sapho (novel) (1884), by Alphonse Daudet
- Sapho (Massenet), 1897 opera by Jules Massenet, based on Daudet's novel
- Sapho (play), 1900 play by Clyde Fitch
- Queen Sapho, a main character in the 1584 Elizabethan play Sapho and Phao
- Sapho (1913 film), a lost 1913 silent film feature drama
- Sapho (1917 film), a 1917 American silent drama film
- Sapho (1934 film), a 1934 French drama film
- Sapho juice, a stimulant drug in the fictional Dune universe

== See also ==
- Sappho (6th century BC), Greek lyric poet
- Sappho (disambiguation)
- Saffo (disambiguation)
