= HMS Sappho (1935) =

HMS Sappho was a Royal Navy auxiliary yacht.

She was launched in 1935 on the Clyde, and taken over by the navy early in the war. She had steam reciprocating propulsion engines, unusual by this time. She was lost off Falmouth on 30 September 1940, presumably either hit a mine or torpedoed, with the loss of around 30 crew.
