= Anatolian diagonal =

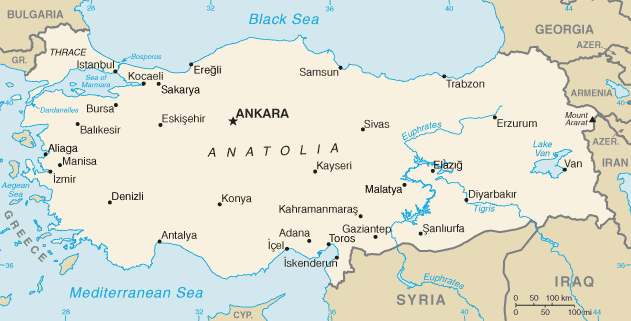
The Anatolian diagonal runs diagonally across Turkey from the northeast Mediterranean Sea to the southeast Black Sea.

The Anatolian diagonal is a theoretical dividing line which runs diagonally across central and eastern Turkey from the northeastern corner of the Mediterranean Sea to the southeastern corner of the Black Sea, and roughly cuts across part of the course of the upper Euphrates River within Turkey's borders.

== Biogeographical barrier ==
The diagonal was first proposed by the British botanist Peter Hadland Davis in 1971. He noticed that many species of plant that existed west of the diagonal were not present to the east, while others found to the east were not present to the west. Of 550 species analysed, 135 were "eastern" and 228 "western". However, Davis considered that there were no physical, geological or climatic differences or change in soil type that could account for the phenomenon. Not only does the Anatolian diagonal form a barrier to floral biodiversity, but about four hundred species of plant are endemic to this diagonal and are found nowhere else.

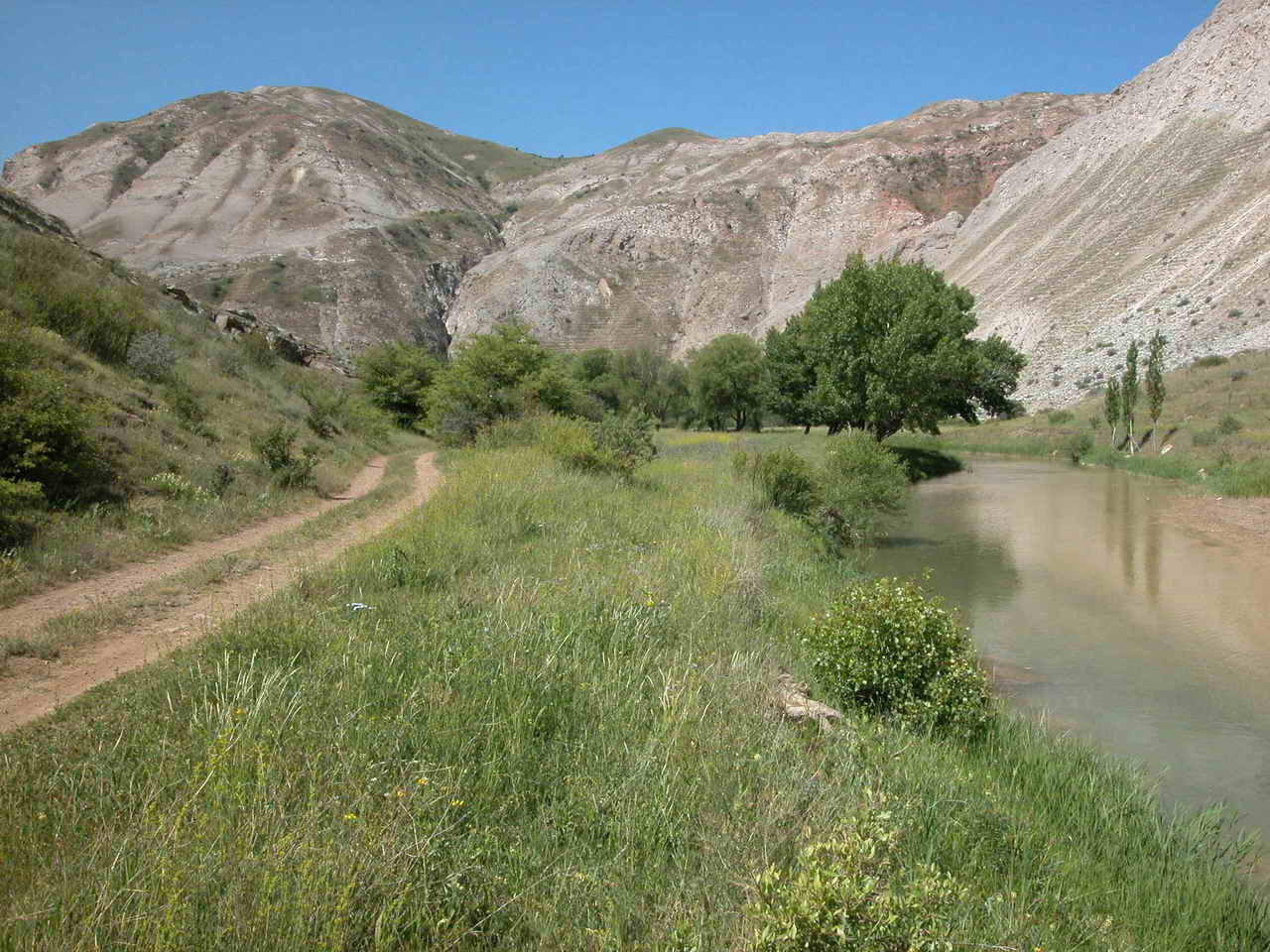
Gypsum hills south of Sivas

In 1989, the Turkish botanists T. Ekim and A. Güner examined the distribution of species by detailed study of the Flora of Turkey, eight volumes of which had been published by then. They came to the conclusion that the diagonal did indeed exist and they found that 33% of the plant species considered were affected by the diagonal in one way or another. They then considered the reasons behind the phenomenon. There was a difference in altitude between the two sides of the diagonal, with the land to the west being lower. Another difference was the climatological regions: the western, interior parts of the diagonal (e.g. Konya, Kırıkkale) were more arid than the eastern parts (e.g. Yozgat, Gümüşhane). In the middle portion of the diagonal there was a gypsum feature, but what effect that had on plant distribution was unclear. They concluded that the ecological differences between the two sides of the diagonal were of greater significance than the palaeo-geological history of the area.

The Irano-Anatolian region is a significant biodiversity hotspot in the Near East and Anatolia is the transition point between the European and Turko-Iranian floras. Turkey was beyond the southern limit of ice in the last ice age, and Anatolia may be considered to be a potential glacial refugium for species of plants and animals in Europe. In the late Pleistocene, sea levels in this region were lower than they are today by as much as 130 m (427 ft) and land bridges intermittently formed across the Bosphorus and the Sea of Marmara. After the end of the most recent ice age, plants surviving to the west of the Anatolian diagonal could spread back into Europe while those to the east could spread into Syria, Iraq and the Near East.

The Taurus Mountains provide a cool damp climate for species that cannot survive the hot dry summer climate on either side, and this could have encouraged survival and speciation, resulting in the many endemic species found here today.
