= SS Lesbian =

SS Lesbian may refer to one of these ships of the Ellerman Lines:

- SS Lesbian (1874), a cargo ship built by Thomas Royden & Sons of Liverpool; acquired from the Leyland Line in 1901; scrapped in 1903
- SS Lesbian (1915), a cargo ship built by W. Harkess & Sons of Middlesbrough; sunk by gunfire from German U-boat U-35 during World War I on 5 January 1917
- SS Lesbian (1923), a cargo ship built by Swan Hunter of Wallsend; seized by Vichy French forces at Beirut during World War II; scuttled 14 July 1941; wreck is a dive site
