= HMS Sappho =

Five ships of the Royal Navy have borne the name HMS Sappho, after the Ancient Greek lyric poet Sappho. Two more were planned but one was cancelled and one received a different name before launching:

- HMS Sappho (1806) was an 18-gun Cruizer-class brig-sloop launched in 1806 and broken up in 1830.
- HMS Sappho (1837) was a 16-gun brig-sloop launched in 1837 that foundered in 1858.
- HMS Sappho was to have been a wood screw sloop. She was laid down in 1861 but was cancelled in 1863.
- HMS Sappho was to have been a wood screw sloop, but she was renamed HMS Eclipse in 1867 before being launched.
- HMS Sappho (1873) was a composite screw sloop launched in 1873 and sold in 1887.
- HMS Sappho (1891) was an Apollo-class second class cruiser launched in 1891 and sold in 1921.
- HMS Sappho (1935) was built in 1935 and destroyed by a German torpedo on 29 September, 1940.
