= USS Sappho =

USS Sappho has been the name of more than one United States Navy ship, and may refer to:

- USS Sappho (SP-1427), a transport in commission from 1918 to 1919
- USS Sappho (AKA-38), an attack cargo ship in commission from 1945 to 1946
