= Anatolian plateau =

Inner part of Asia Minor Highlands in Turkey

Coordinates: 39°N 33°E

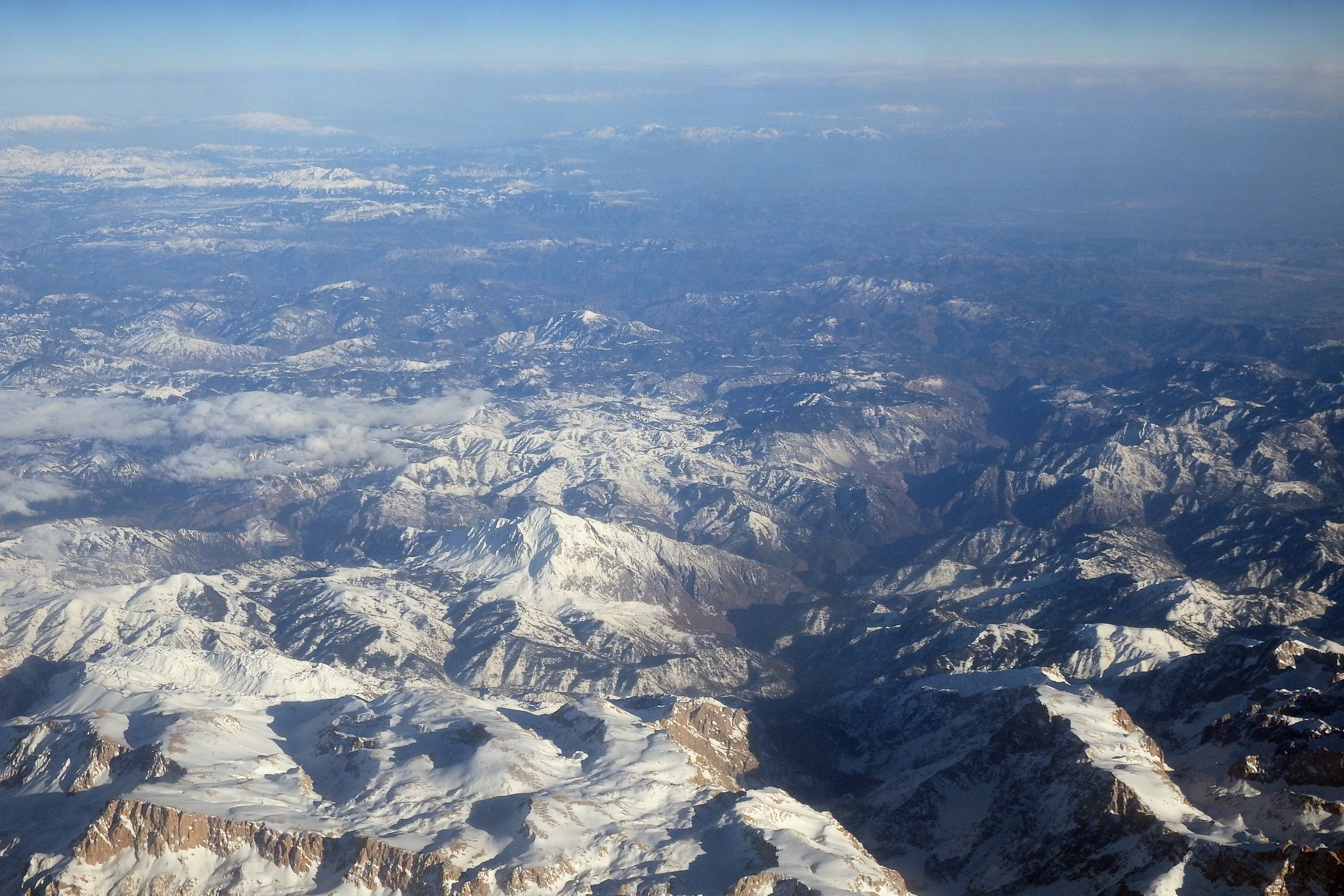
Anatolian plateau in winter from air

The Anatolian plateau (Turkish: Anadolu Yaylası or Anadolu Platosu) is a plateau that occupies most of Turkey's surface area. The elevation of the plateau ranges from 600 metres (2,000 ft) in the west to 1,200 metres (3,900 ft). Mount Erciyes near Kayseri, is the highest elevation at 3,917 metres (12,851 ft). Ankara, the capital of Turkey, is located in the northwestern part of this plateau.

== Overview ==
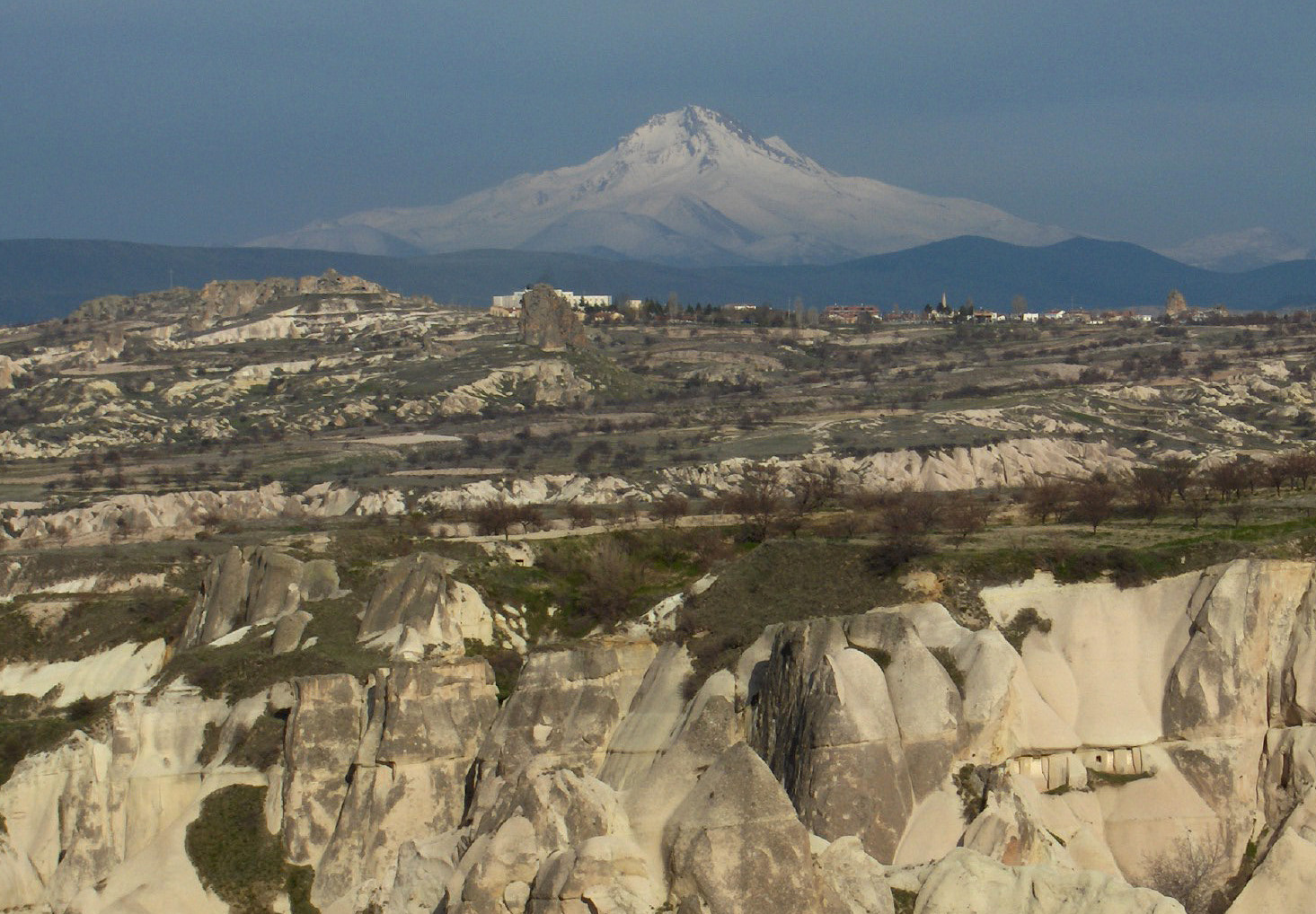
View of Mount Erciyes (3,917 m / 12,851 ft) from Cappadocia

In Turkey, stretching inland from the Aegean coastal plain, the Central Anatolia Region occupies the area between the two zones of the folded mountains, extending east to the point where the two ranges converge. The plateau-like, semi-arid highlands of Anatolia are considered the heartland of the country. The region varies in elevation from 700 metres (2,300 ft) to 2,000 metres (6,600 ft) from west to east. The two largest basins on the plateau are the Konya Ovası and the basin occupied by the large salt lake, Tuz Gölü. Both basins are characterized by inland drainage. Wooded areas are confined to the northwest and northeast of the plateau. Rain-fed cultivation is widespread, with wheat being the principal crop. Irrigated agriculture is restricted to the areas surrounding rivers and wherever sufficient underground water is available. Important irrigated crops include barley, corn, cotton, various fruits, grapes, opium poppies, sugar beets, roses, and tobacco. There also is extensive grazing throughout the plateau.

Central Anatolia receives little annual precipitation. For instance, the semi-arid center of the plateau receives an average yearly precipitation of only 300 millimetres (12 in). However, actual precipitation from year to year is irregular and occasionally may be less than 200 millimetres (7.9 in), leading to severe reductions in crop yields for both rain-fed and irrigated agriculture. In years of low precipitation, stock losses also can be high. Overgrazing has contributed to soil erosion on the plateau. During the summers, frequent dust storms blow a fine yellow powder across the plateau. Locusts occasionally ravage the eastern area in April and May. In general, the plateau experiences a wide range of temperatures, with almost no rainfall in summer and cold weather with heavy snow in winter.

== See also ==
- Geography of Turkey
