= Irano-Turanian Region =

Floristic region in Asia

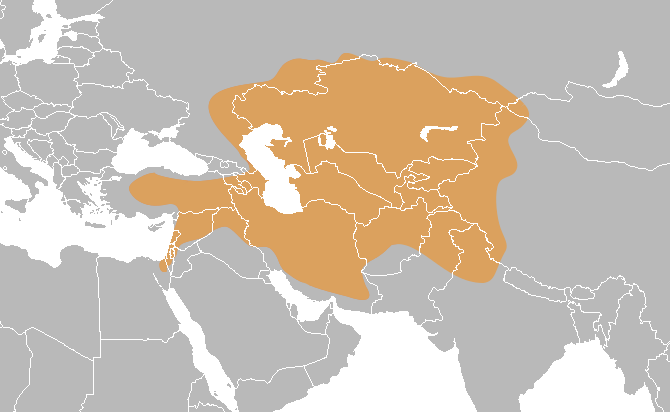
Irano-Turanian Region

The Irano-Turanian Region is a floristic region located within the Tethyan Subkingdom of the Holarctic Kingdom. It is divided into 12 floristic provinces according to the work of Armen Takhtajan, a Soviet-Armenian botanist who created a classification system for flowering plants. One of the main characteristics of the region is a great diversity and abundance of species, especially in the Iranian Plateau. The region's climate is predominantly continental, with most of the precipitation occurring in the winter and spring.
