= List of codes used in the World Geographical Scheme for Recording Plant Distributions =

The World Geographical Scheme for Recording Plant Distributions (WGSRPD) is a biogeographical system developed by the international Biodiversity Information Standards (TDWG) organization, formerly the International Working Group on Taxonomic Databases. The system provides clear definitions and codes for recording plant distributions at four scales or levels, from "botanical continents" down to parts of large countries. Current users of the system include the International Union for Conservation of Nature (IUCN), and the Germplasm Resources Information Network (GRIN). Plants of the World Online uses Kew's data sources, and hence also uses the WGSRPD for distributions.

== Codes ==
The table is arranged in the systematic order used in the WGSRPD. The levels used in the scheme are:

1. Nine botanical continents; the code consists of a single digit
2. Regions – each botanical continent is divided into between two and ten sub-continental regions; a two-digit code is used for regions, in which the first digit is the continent
3. Areas or "botanical countries" – most regions are subdivided into units, generally equating to a political country, but large countries may be split or outlying areas omitted; a three-letter code is used for areas
4. "Basic recording units" – the lowest level is only used for very large "botanical countries", subdividing them into states, provinces or islands on purely political grounds; the full code is made up of a two-letter code appended to the corresponding area code

Order	Level	Code	WGSRPD name	Article link	Flora category
1	L1	1	Europe	Europe	Category:Flora of Europe
2	L2	10	Northern Europe	Northern Europe	Category:Flora of Northern Europe
3	L3	DEN	Denmark	Denmark	Category:Flora of Denmark
4	L3	FIN	Finland	Finland	Category:Flora of Finland
5	L3	FOR	Føroyar	Faroe Islands	Category:Flora of the Faroe Islands
6	L3	GRB	Great Britain	Great Britain	Category:Flora of Great Britain
7	L3	ICE	Iceland	Iceland	Category:Flora of Iceland
8	L3	IRE	Ireland	Ireland	Category:Flora of Ireland
9	L4	IRE-IR	Ireland	Republic of Ireland	Category:Flora of the Republic of Ireland
10	L4	IRE-NI	Northern Ireland	Northern Ireland	Category:Flora of Northern Ireland
11	L3	NOR	Norway	Norway	Category:Flora of Norway
12	L3	SVA	Svalbard	Svalbard	Category:Flora of Svalbard
13	L3	SWE	Sweden	Sweden	Category:Flora of Sweden
14	L2	11	Middle Europe	Central Europe	Category:Flora of Middle Europe
15	L3	AUT	Austria	Austria	Category:Flora of Austria
16	L4	AUT-AU	Austria		Not used; see the parent Level 3 category
17	L4	AUT-LI	Liechtenstein	Liechtenstein	Category:Flora of Liechtenstein
18	L3	BGM	Belgium	Belgium	Category:Flora of Belgium
19	L4	BGM-BE	Belgium		Not used; see the parent Level 3 category
20	L4	BGM-LU	Luxembourg	Luxembourg	Category:Flora of Luxembourg
21	L3	CZE	Czechoslovakia	Czechoslovakia	Category:Flora of Czechoslovakia
22	L4	CZE-CZ	Czech Republic	Czech Republic	Category:Flora of the Czech Republic
23	L4	CZE-SL	Slovakia	Slovakia	Category:Flora of Slovakia
24	L3	GER	Germany	Germany	Category:Flora of Germany
25	L3	HUN	Hungary	Hungary	Category:Flora of Hungary
26	L3	NET	Netherlands	Netherlands	Category:Flora of the Netherlands
27	L3	POL	Poland	Poland	Category:Flora of Poland
28	L3	SWI	Switzerland	Switzerland	Category:Flora of Switzerland
29	L2	12	Southwestern Europe		Category:Flora of Southwestern Europe
30	L3	BAL	Baleares	Balearic Islands	Category:Flora of the Balearic Islands
31	L3	COR	Corse	Corsica	Category:Flora of Corsica
32	L3	FRA	France	France	Category:Flora of France
33	L4	FRA-CI	Channel Is.	Channel Islands	Category:Flora of the Channel Islands
34	L4	FRA-FR	France		Not used; see the parent Level 3 category
35	L4	FRA-MO	Monaco	Monaco	Category:Flora of Monaco
36	L3	POR	Portugal	Portugal	Category:Flora of Portugal
37	L3	SAR	Sardegna	Sardinia	Category:Flora of Sardinia
38	L3	SPA	Spain	Spain	Category:Flora of Spain
39	L4	SPA-AN	Andorra	Andorra	Category:Flora of Andorra
40	L4	SPA-GI	Gibraltar	Gibraltar	Category:Flora of Gibraltar
41	L4	SPA-SP	Spain		Not used; see the parent Level 3 category
42	L2	13	Southeastern Europe		Category:Flora of Southeastern Europe
43	L3	ALB	Albania	Albania	Category:Flora of Albania
44	L3	BUL	Bulgaria	Bulgaria	Category:Flora of Bulgaria
45	L3	GRC	Greece	Greece	Category:Flora of Greece
46	L3	ITA	Italy	Italy	Category:Flora of Italy
47	L4	ITA-IT	Italy		Not used; see the parent Level 3 category
48	L4	ITA-SM	San Marino	San Marino	Category:Flora of San Marino
49	L4	ITA-VC	Vatican City	Vatican City	Category:Flora of the Vatican City
50	L3	KRI	Kriti	Crete	Category:Flora of Crete
51	L3	ROM	Romania	Romania	Category:Flora of Romania
52	L3	SIC	Sicilia	Sicily	Category:Flora of Sicily
53	L4	SIC-MA	Malta	Malta	Category:Flora of Malta
54	L4	SIC-SI	Sicilia		Not used; see the parent Level 3 category
55	L3	TUE	Turkey-in-Europe	European Turkey	Category:Flora of European Turkey
56	L3	YUG	Yugoslavia	Yugoslavia	Category:Flora of Yugoslavia
57	L4	YUG-BH	Bosnia- Herzegovina	Bosnia and Herzegovina	Category:Flora of Bosnia and Herzegovina
58	L4	YUG-CR	Croatia	Croatia	Category:Flora of Croatia
59	L4	YUG-KO	Kosovo	Kosovo	Category:Flora of Kosovo
60	L4	YUG-MA	Macedonia	North Macedonia	Category:Flora of North Macedonia
61	L4	YUG-MN	Montenegro	Montenegro	Category:Flora of Montenegro
62	L4	YUG-SE	Serbia	Serbia	Category:Flora of Serbia
63	L4	YUG-SL	Slovenia	Slovenia	Category:Flora of Slovenia
64	L2	14	Eastern Europe	Eastern Europe	Category:Flora of Eastern Europe
65	L3	BLR	Belarus	Belarus	Category:Flora of Belarus
66	L3	BLT	Baltic States	Baltic states	Category:Flora of the Baltic states
67	L4	BLT-ES	Estonia	Estonia	Category:Flora of Estonia
68	L4	BLT-KA	Kaliningrad	Kaliningrad	Category:Flora of Kaliningrad
69	L4	BLT-LA	Latvia	Latvia	Category:Flora of Latvia
70	L4	BLT-LI	Lithuania	Lithuania	Category:Flora of Lithuania
71	L3	KRY	Krym	Crimean Peninsula	Category:Flora of the Crimean Peninsula
72	L3	RUC	Central European Russia		Category:Flora of Central European Russia
73	L3	RUE	East European Russia		Category:Flora of East European Russia
74	L3	RUN	North European Russia		Category:Flora of North European Russia
75	L3	RUS	South European Russia		Category:Flora of South European Russia
76	L3	RUW	Northwest European Russia		Category:Flora of Northwest European Russia
77	L3	UKR	Ukraine	Ukraine	Category:Flora of Ukraine
78	L4	UKR-MO	Moldova	Moldova	Category:Flora of Moldova
79	L4	UKR-UK	Ukraine		Not used; see the parent Level 3 category
80	L1	2	Africa	Africa	Category:Flora of Africa
81	L2	20	Northern Africa	North Africa	Category:Flora of North Africa
82	L3	ALG	Algeria	Algeria	Category:Flora of Algeria
83	L3	EGY	Egypt	Egypt	Category:Flora of Egypt
84	L3	LBY	Libya	Libya	Category:Flora of Libya
85	L3	MOR	Morocco	Morocco	Category:Flora of Morocco
86	L4	MOR-MO	Morocco		Not used; see the parent Level 3 category
87	L4	MOR-SP	Spanish North African Territories		Category:Flora of the Spanish North African Territories
88	L3	TUN	Tunisia	Tunisia	Category:Flora of Tunisia
89	L3	WSA	Western Sahara	Western Sahara	Category:Flora of Western Sahara
90	L2	21	Macaronesia	Macaronesia	Category:Flora of Macaronesia
91	L3	AZO	Azores	Azores	Category:Flora of the Azores
92	L3	CNY	Canary Is.	Canary Islands	Category:Flora of the Canary Islands
93	L3	CVI	Cape Verde	Cape Verde	Category:Flora of Cape Verde
94	L3	MDR	Madeira	Madeira	Category:Flora of Madeira
95	L3	SEL	Selvagens	Savage Islands	Category:Flora of the Savage Islands
96	L2	22	West Tropical Africa		Category:Flora of West Tropical Africa
97	L3	BEN	Benin	Benin	Category:Flora of Benin
98	L3	BKN	Burkina	Burkina Faso	Category:Flora of Burkina Faso
99	L3	GAM	Gambia, The	the Gambia	Category:Flora of the Gambia
100	L3	GHA	Ghana	Ghana	Category:Flora of Ghana
101	L3	GNB	Guinea-Bissau	Guinea-Bissau	Category:Flora of Guinea-Bissau
102	L3	GUI	Guinea	Guinea	Category:Flora of Guinea
103	L3	IVO	Ivory Coast	Ivory Coast	Category:Flora of Ivory Coast
104	L3	LBR	Liberia	Liberia	Category:Flora of Liberia
105	L3	MLI	Mali	Mali	Category:Flora of Mali
106	L3	MTN	Mauritania	Mauritania	Category:Flora of Mauritania
107	L3	NGA	Nigeria	Nigeria	Category:Flora of Nigeria
108	L3	NGR	Niger	Niger	Category:Flora of Niger
109	L3	SEN	Senegal	Senegal	Category:Flora of Senegal
110	L3	SIE	Sierra Leone	Sierra Leone	Category:Flora of Sierra Leone
111	L3	TOG	Togo	Togo	Category:Flora of Togo
112	L2	23	West-Central Tropical Africa		Category:Flora of West-Central Tropical Africa
113	L3	BUR	Burundi	Burundi	Category:Flora of Burundi
114	L3	CAB	Cabinda	Cabinda Province	Category:Flora of Cabinda Province
115	L3	CAF	Central African Republic	Central African Republic	Category:Flora of the Central African Republic
116	L3	CMN	Cameroon	Cameroon	Category:Flora of Cameroon
117	L3	CON	Congo	Republic of the Congo	Category:Flora of the Republic of the Congo
118	L3	EQG	Equatorial Guinea	Equatorial Guinea	Category:Flora of Equatorial Guinea
119	L3	GAB	Gabon	Gabon	Category:Flora of Gabon
120	L3	GGI	Gulf of Guinea Is.	Gulf of Guinea islands	Category:Flora of the Gulf of Guinea islands
121	L4	GGI-AN	Annobón	Annobón	Category:Flora of Annobón
122	L4	GGI-BI	Bioko	Bioko	Category:Flora of Bioko
123	L4	GGI-PR	Príncipe	Príncipe	Category:Flora of Príncipe
124	L4	GGI-ST	São Tomé	São Tomé Island	Category:Flora of São Tomé Island
125	L3	RWA	Rwanda	Rwanda	Category:Flora of Rwanda
126	L3	ZAI	Zaire	Democratic Republic of the Congo	Category:Flora of the Democratic Republic of the Congo
127	L2	24	Northeast Tropical Africa		Category:Flora of Northeast Tropical Africa
128	L3	CHA	Chad	Chad	Category:Flora of Chad
129	L3	DJI	Djibouti	Djibouti	Category:Flora of Djibouti
130	L3	ERI	Eritrea	Eritrea	Category:Flora of Eritrea
131	L3	ETH	Ethiopia	Ethiopia	Category:Flora of Ethiopia
132	L3	SOC	Socotra	Socotra	Category:Flora of Socotra
133	L3	SOM	Somalia	Somalia	Category:Flora of Somalia
134	L3	SUD	Sudan	Sudan	Category:Flora of Sudan
135	L2	25	East Tropical Africa		Category:Flora of East Tropical Africa
136	L3	KEN	Kenya	Kenya	Category:Flora of Kenya
137	L3	TAN	Tanzania	Tanzania	Category:Flora of Tanzania
138	L3	UGA	Uganda	Uganda	Category:Flora of Uganda
139	L2	26	South Tropical Africa		Category:Flora of South Tropical Africa
140	L3	ANG	Angola	Angola	Category:Flora of Angola
141	L3	MLW	Malawi	Malawi	Category:Flora of Malawi
142	L3	MOZ	Mozambique	Mozambique	Category:Flora of Mozambique
143	L3	ZAM	Zambia	Zambia	Category:Flora of Zambia
144	L3	ZIM	Zimbabwe	Zimbabwe	Category:Flora of Zimbabwe
145	L2	27	Southern Africa	Southern Africa	Category:Flora of Southern Africa
146	L3	BOT	Botswana	Botswana	Category:Flora of Botswana
147	L3	CPP	Cape Provinces	Cape Provinces	Category:Flora of the Cape Provinces
148	L4	CPP-EC	Eastern Cape Province	Eastern Cape	Category:Flora of the Eastern Cape
149	L4	CPP-NC	Northern Cape Province	Northern Cape	Category:Flora of the Northern Cape
150	L4	CPP-WC	Western Cape Province	Western Cape	Category:Flora of the Western Cape
151	L3	CPV	Caprivi Strip	Caprivi Strip	Category:Flora of the Caprivi Strip
152	L3	LES	Lesotho	Lesotho	Category:Flora of Lesotho
153	L3	NAM	Namibia	Namibia	Category:Flora of Namibia
154	L3	NAT	KwaZulu-Natal	KwaZulu-Natal	Category:Flora of KwaZulu-Natal
155	L3	OFS	Free State	Free State	Category:Flora of the Free State (province)
156	L3	SWZ	Swaziland	Swaziland	Category:Flora of Swaziland
157	L3	TVL	Northern Provinces	Northern Provinces	Category:Flora of the Northern Provinces
158	L4	TVL-GA	Gauteng	Gauteng	Category:Flora of Gauteng
159	L4	TVL-MP	Mpumalanga	Mpumalanga	Category:Flora of Mpumalanga
160	L4	TVL-NP	Northern Province	Limpopo	Category:Flora of Limpopo
161	L4	TVL-NW	North-West Province	North West (South African province)	Category:Flora of the North West (South African province)
162	L2	28	Middle Atlantic Ocean		Category:Flora of the middle Atlantic Ocean
163	L3	ASC	Ascension	Ascension Island	Category:Flora of Ascension Island
164	L3	STH	St.Helena	Saint Helena	Category:Flora of Saint Helena
165	L2	29	Western Indian Ocean		Category:Flora of the Western Indian Ocean
166	L3	ALD	Aldabra	Aldabra	Category:Flora of Aldabra
167	L3	CGS	Chagos Archipelago	Chagos Archipelago	Category:Flora of the Chagos Archipelago
168	L3	COM	Comoros	Comoros	Category:Flora of the Comoros
169	L4	COM-CO	Comoros		Not used; see the parent Level 3 category
170	L4	COM-MA	Mayotte	Mayotte	Category:Flora of Mayotte
171	L3	MAU	Mauritius	Mauritius	Category:Flora of Mauritius
172	L3	MCI	Mozambique Channel Is.	Mozambique Channel Islands	Category:Flora of the Mozambique Channel Islands
173	L3	MDG	Madagascar	Madagascar	Category:Flora of Madagascar
174	L3	REU	Réunion	Réunion	Category:Flora of Réunion
175	L3	ROD	Rodrigues	Rodrigues	Category:Flora of Rodrigues
176	L3	SEY	Seychelles	Seychelles	Category:Flora of Seychelles
177	L1	3	Asia-Temperate		Category:Flora of temperate Asia
178	L2	30	Siberia	Siberia	Category:Flora of Siberia
179	L3	ALT	Altay	Altai Krai, Altai Republic	Category:Flora of Altai (region)
180	L3	BRY	Buryatiya	Buryatia	Category:Flora of Buryatia
181	L3	CTA	Chita	Chita Oblast	Category:Flora of Chita Oblast
182	L3	IRK	Irkutsk	Irkutsk Oblast	Category:Flora of Irkutsk Oblast
183	L3	KRA	Krasnoyarsk	Krasnoyarsk Krai	Category:Flora of Krasnoyarsk Krai
184	L3	TVA	Tuva	Tuva	Category:Flora of Tuva
185	L3	WSB	West Siberia	West Siberia	Category:Flora of West Siberia
186	L3	YAK	Yakutskiya	Sakha Republic	Category:Flora of Yakutia
187	L2	31	Russian Far East	Russian Far East	Category:Flora of the Russian Far East
188	L3	AMU	Amur	Amur Oblast	Category:Flora of Amur Oblast
189	L3	KAM	Kamchatka	Kamchatka Krai	Category:Flora of Kamchatka Krai
190	L3	KHA	Khabarovsk	Khabarovsk Krai	Category:Flora of Khabarovsk Krai
191	L3	KUR	Kuril Is.	Kuril Islands	Category:Flora of the Kuril Islands
192	L3	MAG	Magadan	Magadan Oblast	Category:Flora of Magadan Oblast
193	L3	PRM	Primorye	Primorsky Krai	Category:Flora of Primorsky Krai
194	L3	SAK	Sakhalin	Sakhalin	Category:Flora of Sakhalin
195	L2	32	Middle Asia	Central Asia	Category:Flora of Central Asia
196	L3	KAZ	Kazakhstan	Kazakhstan	Category:Flora of Kazakhstan
197	L3	KGZ	Kirgizistan	Kyrgyzstan	Category:Flora of Kyrgyzstan
198	L3	TKM	Turkmenistan	Turkmenistan	Category:Flora of Turkmenistan
199	L3	TZK	Tadzhikistan	Tajikistan	Category:Flora of Tajikistan
200	L3	UZB	Uzbekistan	Uzbekistan	Category:Flora of Uzbekistan
201	L2	33	Caucasus	Caucasus	Category:Flora of the Caucasus
202	L3	NCS	North Caucasus	North Caucasus	Category:Flora of the North Caucasus
203	L4	NCS-CH	Chechnya	Chechnya	Category:Flora of Chechnya
204	L4	NCS-DA	Dagestan	Dagestan	Category:Flora of Dagestan
205	L4	NCS-IN	Ingushetiya	Ingushetia	Category:Flora of Ingushetia
206	L4	NCS-KB	Kabardino-Balkariya	Kabardino-Balkaria	Category:Flora of Kabardino-Balkaria
207	L4	NCS-KC	Karacheyevo-Cherkessiya	Karachay-Cherkessia	Category:Flora of Karachay-Cherkessia
208	L4	NCS-KR	Krasnodar	Krasnodar Krai	Category:Flora of Krasnodar Krai
209	L4	NCS-SO	Severo-Osetiya	North Ossetia-Alania	Category:Flora of North Ossetia-Alania
210	L4	NCS-ST	Stavropol	Stavropol Krai	Category:Flora of Stavropol Krai
211	L3	TCS	Transcaucasus	Transcaucasus	Category:Flora of the Transcaucasus
212	L4	TCS-AB	Abkhaziya	Abkhazia	Category:Flora of Abkhazia
213	L4	TCS-AD	Adzhariya	Adjara	Category:Flora of Adjara
214	L4	TCS-AR	Armenia	Armenia	Category:Flora of Armenia
215	L4	TCS-AZ	Azerbaijan	Azerbaijan	Category:Flora of Azerbaijan
216	L4	TCS-GR	Gruziya	Georgia (country)	Category:Flora of Georgia (country)
217	L4	TCS-NA	Nakhichevan	Nakhchivan Autonomous Republic	Category:Flora of the Nakhchivan Autonomous Republic
218	L4	TCS-NK	Nagorno Karabakh	Nagorno-Karabakh	Category:Flora of Nagorno-Karabakh
219	L2	34	Western Asia	Western Asia	Category:Flora of Western Asia
220	L3	AFG	Afghanistan	Afghanistan	Category:Flora of Afghanistan
221	L3	CYP	Cyprus	Cyprus	Category:Flora of Cyprus
222	L3	EAI	East Aegean Is.		Category:Flora of the East Aegean Islands
223	L3	IRN	Iran	Iran	Category:Flora of Iran
224	L3	IRQ	Iraq	Iraq	Category:Flora of Iraq
225	L3	LBS	Lebanon-Syria		Category:Flora of Lebanon and Syria
226	L4	LBS-LB	Lebanon	Lebanon	Category:Flora of Lebanon
227	L4	LBS-SY	Syria	Syria	Category:Flora of Syria
228	L3	PAL	Palestine	Palestine (region)	Category:Flora of Palestine (region)
229	L4	PAL-JO	Jordan	Jordan	Category:Flora of Jordan
230	L4	PAL-IS	Israel	Israel	Category:Flora of Israel
231	L3	SIN	Sinai	Sinai	Category:Flora of Sinai
232	L3	TUR	Turkey	Turkey	Category:Flora of Turkey
233	L2	35	Arabian Peninsula	Arabian Peninsula	Category:Flora of the Arabian Peninsula
234	L3	GST	Gulf States		Category:Flora of the Gulf States
235	L4	GST-BA	Bahrain	Bahrain	Category:Flora of Bahrain
236	L4	GST-QA	Qatar	Qatar	Category:Flora of Qatar
237	L4	GST-UA	United Arab Emirates	United Arab Emirates	Category:Flora of the United Arab Emirates
238	L3	KUW	Kuwait	Kuwait	Category:Flora of Kuwait
239	L3	OMA	Oman	Oman	Category:Flora of Oman
240	L3	SAU	Saudi Arabia	Saudi Arabia	Category:Flora of Saudi Arabia
241	L3	YEM	Yemen	Yemen	Category:Flora of Yemen
242	L4	YEM-NY	North Yemen	North Yemen	Category:Flora of North Yemen
243	L4	YEM-SY	South Yemen	South Yemen	Category:Flora of South Yemen
244	L2	36	China	China	Category:Flora of China
245	L3	CHC	China South-Central		Category:Flora of South-Central China
246	L4	CHC-CQ	Chongqing	Chongqing	Category:Flora of Chongqing
247	L4	CHC-GZ	Guizhou	Guizhou	Category:Flora of Guizhou
248	L4	CHC-HU	Hubei	Hubei	Category:Flora of Hubei
249	L4	CHC-SC	Sichuan	Sichuan	Category:Flora of Sichuan
250	L4	CHC-YN	Yunnan	Yunnan	Category:Flora of Yunnan
251	L3	CHH	Hainan	Hainan	Category:Flora of Hainan
252	L3	CHI	Inner Mongolia	Inner Mongolia	Category:Flora of Inner Mongolia
253	L4	CHI-NM	Nei Mongol		Not used; see the parent Level 3 category
254	L4	CHI-NX	Ningxia	Ningxia	Category:Flora of Ningxia
255	L3	CHM	Manchuria	Manchuria	Category:Flora of Manchuria
256	L4	CHM-HJ	Heilongjiang	Heilongjiang	Category:Flora of Heilongjiang
257	L4	CHM-JL	Jilin	Jilin	Category:Flora of Jilin
258	L4	CHM-LN	Liaoning	Liaoning	Category:Flora of Liaoning
259	L3	CHN	China North-Central		Category:Flora of North-Central China
260	L4	CHN-BJ	Beijing	Beijing	Category:Flora of Beijing
261	L4	CHN-GS	Gansu	Gansu	Category:Flora of Gansu
262	L4	CHN-HB	Hebei	Hebei	Category:Flora of Hebei
263	L4	CHN-SA	Shaanxi	Shaanxi	Category:Flora of Shaanxi
264	L4	CHN-SD	Shandong	Shandong	Category:Flora of Shandong
265	L4	CHN-SX	Shanxi	Shanxi	Category:Flora of Shanxi
266	L4	CHN-TJ	Tianjin	Tianjin	Category:Flora of Tianjin
267	L3	CHQ	Qinghai	Qinghai	Category:Flora of Qinghai
268	L3	CHS	China Southeast		Category:Flora of Southeast China
269	L4	CHS-AH	Anhui	Anhui	Category:Flora of Anhui
270	L4	CHS-FJ	Fujian	Fujian	Category:Flora of Fujian
271	L4	CHS-GD	Guangdong	Guangdong	Category:Flora of Guangdong
272	L4	CHS-GX	Guangxi	Guangxi	Category:Flora of Guangxi
273	L4	CHS-HE	Henan	Henan	Category:Flora of Henan
274	L4	CHS-HK	Hong Kong	Hong Kong	Category:Flora of Hong Kong
275	L4	CHS-HN	Hunan	Hunan	Category:Flora of Hunan
276	L4	CHS-JS	Jiangsu	Jiangsu	Category:Flora of Jiangsu
277	L4	CHS-JX	Jiangxi	Jiangxi	Category:Flora of Jiangxi
278	L4	CHS-KI	Kin-Men	Kinmen	Category:Flora of Kinmen
279	L4	CHS-MA	Macau	Macau	Category:Flora of Macau
280	L4	CHS-MP	Ma-tsu-Pai-chuan	Matsu Islands	Category:Flora of the Matsu Islands
281	L4	CHS-SH	Shanghai	Shanghai	Category:Flora of Shanghai
282	L4	CHS-ZJ	Zhejiang	Zhejiang	Category:Flora of Zhejiang
283	L3	CHT	Tibet	Tibet	Category:Flora of Tibet
284	L3	CHX	Xinjiang	Xinjiang	Category:Flora of Xinjiang
285	L2	37	Mongolia		Not used; only contains Mongolia
286	L3	MON	Mongolia	Mongolia	Category:Flora of Mongolia
287	L2	38	Eastern Asia		Category:Flora of Eastern Asia
288	L3	JAP	Japan	Japan	Category:Flora of Japan
289	L4	JAP-HK	Hokkaido	Hokkaido	Category:Flora of Hokkaido
290	L4	JAP-HN	Honshu	Honshu	Category:Flora of Honshu
291	L4	JAP-KY	Kyushu	Kyushu	Category:Flora of Kyushu
292	L4	JAP-SH	Shikoku	Shikoku	Category:Flora of Shikoku
293	L3	KOR	Korea	Korea	Category:Flora of Korea
294	L4	KOR-NK	North Korea	North Korea	Category:Flora of North Korea
295	L4	KOR-SK	South Korea	South Korea	Category:Flora of South Korea
296	L3	KZN	Kazan-retto	Volcano Islands	Category:Flora of the Volcano Islands
297	L3	NNS	Nansei-shoto	Ryukyu Islands	Category:Flora of the Ryukyu Islands
298	L3	OGA	Ogasawara-shoto	Bonin Islands	Category:Flora of the Bonin Islands
299	L3	TAI	Taiwan	Taiwan	Category:Flora of Taiwan
300	L1	4	Asia-Tropical	tropical Asia	Category:Flora of tropical Asia
301	L2	40	Indian Subcontinent	Indian subcontinent	Category:Flora of the Indian subcontinent
302	L3	ASS	Assam		Category:Flora of Assam (region)
303	L4	ASS-AS	Assam	Assam	Category:Flora of Assam
304	L4	ASS-MA	Manipur	Manipur	Category:Flora of Manipur
305	L4	ASS-ME	Meghalaya	Meghalaya	Category:Flora of Meghalaya
306	L4	ASS-MI	Mizoram	Mizoram	Category:Flora of Mizoram
307	L4	ASS-NA	Nagaland	Nagaland	Category:Flora of Nagaland
308	L4	ASS-TR	Tripura	Tripura	Category:Flora of Tripura
309	L3	BAN	Bangladesh	Bangladesh	Category:Flora of Bangladesh
310	L3	EHM	East Himalaya		Category:Flora of East Himalaya
311	L4	EHM-AP	Arunachal Pradesh	Arunachal Pradesh	Category:Flora of Arunachal Pradesh
312	L4	EHM-BH	Bhutan	Bhutan	Category:Flora of Bhutan
313	L4	EHM-DJ	Darjiling	Darjeeling	Category:Flora of Darjeeling
314	L4	EHM-SI	Sikkim	Sikkim	Category:Flora of Sikkim
315	L3	IND	India		Category:Flora of India (region)
316	L4	IND-AP	Andhra Pradesh	Andhra Pradesh	Category:Flora of Andhra Pradesh
317	L4	IND-BI	Bihar	Bihar	Category:Flora of Bihar
318	L4	IND-CH	Chandigarh	Chandigarh	Category:Flora of Chandigarh
319	L4	IND-CT	Chhattisgarh	Chhattisgarh	Category:Flora of Chhattisgarh
320	L4	IND-DD	Dadra-Nagar-Haveli	Dadra and Nagar Haveli	Category:Flora of Dadra and Nagar Haveli
321	L4	IND-DE	Delhi	Delhi	Category:Flora of Delhi
322	L4	IND-DI	Diu	Diu district	Category:Flora of Diu district
323	L4	IND-DM	Daman	Daman district, India	Category:Flora of Daman district, India
324	L4	IND-GO	Goa	Goa	Category:Flora of Goa
325	L4	IND-GU	Gujarat	Gujarat	Category:Flora of Gujarat
326	L4	IND-HA	Haryana	Haryana	Category:Flora of Haryana
327	L4	IND-JK	Jharkhand	Jharkhand	Category:Flora of Jharkhand
328	L4	IND-KE	Kerala	Kerala	Category:Flora of Kerala
329	L4	IND-KL	Karaikal	Karaikal	Category:Flora of Karaikal
330	L4	IND-KT	Karnataka	Karnataka	Category:Flora of Karnataka
331	L4	IND-MH	Mahe	Mahé district	Category:Flora of Mahé district
332	L4	IND-MP	Madhya Pradesh	Madhya Pradesh	Category:Flora of Madhya Pradesh
333	L4	IND-MR	Maharashtra	Maharashtra	Category:Flora of Maharashtra
334	L4	IND-OR	Orissa	Odisha	Category:Flora of Odisha
335	L4	IND-PO	Pondicherry	Puducherry	Category:Flora of Puducherry
336	L4	IND-PU	Punjab	Punjab	Category:Flora of Punjab
337	L4	IND-RA	Rajasthan	Rajasthan	Category:Flora of Rajasthan
338	L4	IND-TN	Tamil Nadu	Tamil Nadu	Category:Flora of Tamil Nadu
339	L4	IND-UP	Uttar Pradesh	Uttar Pradesh	Category:Flora of Uttar Pradesh
340	L4	IND-WB	West Bengal	West Bengal	Category:Flora of West Bengal
341	L4	IND-YA	Yanam	Yanam	Category:Flora of Yanam
342	L3	LDV	Laccadive Is.	Laccadive Islands	Category:Flora of the Laccadive Islands
343	L3	MDV	Maldives	Maldives	Category:Flora of the Maldives
344	L3	NEP	Nepal	Nepal	Category:Flora of Nepal
345	L3	PAK	Pakistan	Pakistan	Category:Flora of Pakistan
346	L3	SRL	Sri Lanka	Sri Lanka	Category:Flora of Sri Lanka
347	L3	WHM	West Himalaya		Category:Flora of West Himalaya
348	L4	WHM-HP	Himachal Pradesh	Himachal Pradesh	Category:Flora of Himachal Pradesh
349	L4	WHM-JK	Jammu-Kashmir	Jammu and Kashmir	Category:Flora of Jammu and Kashmir
350	L4	WHM-UT	Uttaranchal	Uttarakhand	Category:Flora of Uttarakhand
351	L2	41	Indo-China	Indo-China	Category:Flora of Indo-China
352	L3	AND	Andaman Is.	Andaman Islands	Category:Flora of the Andaman Islands
353	L4	AND-AN	Andaman Is.		Not used; see the parent Level 3 category
354	L4	AND-CO	Coco Is.	Coco Islands	Category:Flora of the Coco Islands
355	L3	CBD	Cambodia	Cambodia	Category:Flora of Cambodia
356	L3	LAO	Laos	Laos	Category:Flora of Laos
357	L3	MYA	Myanmar	Myanmar	Category:Flora of Myanmar
358	L3	NCB	Nicobar Is.	Nicobar Islands	Category:Flora of the Nicobar Islands
359	L3	SCS	South China Sea	South China Sea	Category:Flora of the South China Sea
360	L4	SCS-PI	Paracel Is.	Paracel Islands	Category:Flora of the Paracel Islands
361	L4	SCS-SI	Spratly Is.	Spratly Islands	Category:Flora of the Spratly Islands
362	L3	THA	Thailand	Thailand	Category:Flora of Thailand
363	L3	VIE	Vietnam	Vietnam	Category:Flora of Vietnam
364	L2	42	Malesia	Malesia	Category:Flora of Malesia
365	L3	BOR	Borneo	Borneo	Category:Flora of Borneo
366	L4	BOR-BR	Brunei	Brunei	Category:Flora of Brunei
367	L4	BOR-KA	Kalimantan	Kalimantan	Category:Flora of Kalimantan
368	L4	BOR-SB	Sabah	Sabah	Category:Flora of Sabah
369	L4	BOR-SR	Sarawak	Sarawak	Category:Flora of Sarawak
370	L3	CKI	Cocos (Keeling) Is.	Cocos (Keeling) Islands	Category:Flora of the Cocos (Keeling) Islands
371	L3	JAW	Jawa	Java	Category:Flora of Java
372	L3	LSI	Lesser Sunda Is.	Lesser Sunda Islands	Category:Flora of the Lesser Sunda Islands
373	L4	LSI-BA	Bali	Bali	Category:Flora of Bali
374	L4	LSI-ET	East Timor	East Timor	Category:Flora of East Timor
375	L4	LSI-LS	Lesser Sunda Is.		Not used; see the parent Level 3 category
376	L3	MLY	Malaya		Category:Flora of Malaya
377	L4	MLY-PM	Peninsular Malaysia	Peninsular Malaysia	Category:Flora of Peninsular Malaysia
378	L4	MLY-SI	Singapore	Singapore	Category:Flora of Singapore
379	L3	MOL	Maluku	Maluku Islands	Category:Flora of the Maluku Islands
380	L3	PHI	Philippines	Philippines	Category:Flora of the Philippines
381	L3	SUL	Sulawesi	Sulawesi	Category:Flora of Sulawesi
382	L3	SUM	Sumatera	Sumatra	Category:Flora of Sumatra
383	L3	XMS	Christmas I.	Christmas Island	Category:Flora of Christmas Island
384	L2	43	Papuasia	Papuasia	Category:Flora of Papuasia
385	L3	BIS	Bismarck Archipelago	Bismarck Archipelago	Category:Flora of the Bismarck Archipelago
386	L3	NWG	New Guinea	New Guinea	Category:Flora of New Guinea
387	L4	NWG-PN	Papua New Guinea	Papua New Guinea	Category:Flora of Papua New Guinea
388	L4	NWG-IJ	Irian Jaya	Western New Guinea	Category:Flora of Western New Guinea
389	L3	SOL	Solomon Is.	Solomon Islands (archipelago)	Category:Flora of the Solomon Islands (archipelago)
390	L4	SOL-NO	North Solomons		Category:Flora of the North Solomons
391	L4	SOL-SO	South Solomons		Category:Flora of the South Solomons
392	L1	5	Australasia	Australasia	Category:Flora of Australasia
393	L2	50	Australia	Australia	Category:Flora of Australia
394	L3	NFK	Norfolk Is.	Norfolk Island	Category:Flora of Norfolk Island
395	L4	NFK-LH	Lord Howe I.	Lord Howe Island	Category:Flora of Lord Howe Island
396	L4	NFK-NI	Norfolk I.		Not used; see the parent Level 3 category
397	L3	NSW	New South Wales	New South Wales	Category:Flora of New South Wales
398	L4	NSW-CT	Australian Capital Territory	Australian Capital Territory	Category:Flora of the Australian Capital Territory
399	L4	NSW-NS	New South Wales		Not used; see the parent Level 3 category
400	L3	NTA	Northern Territory	Northern Territory	Category:Flora of the Northern Territory
401	L3	QLD	Queensland	Queensland	Category:Flora of Queensland
402	L4	QLD-CS	Coral Sea Is. Territory	Coral Sea Islands Territory	Category:Flora of the Coral Sea Islands Territory
403	L4	QLD-QU	Queensland		Not used; see the parent Level 3 category
404	L3	SOA	South Australia	South Australia	Category:Flora of South Australia
405	L3	TAS	Tasmania	Tasmania	Category:Flora of Tasmania
406	L3	VIC	Victoria	Victoria (Australia)	Category:Flora of Victoria (Australia)
407	L3	WAU	Western Australia	Western Australia	Category:Flora of Western Australia
408	L4	WAU-AC	Ashmore-Cartier Is.	Ashmore and Cartier Islands	Category:Flora of Ashmore and Cartier Islands
409	L4	WAU-WA	Western Australia		Not used; see the parent Level 3 category
410	L2	51	New Zealand	New Zealand	Category:Flora of New Zealand
411	L3	ATP	Antipodean Is.	Antipodes Islands	Category:Flora of the Antipodes Islands
412	L3	CTM	Chatham Is.	Chatham Islands	Category:Flora of the Chatham Islands
413	L3	KER	Kermadec Is.	Kermadec Islands	Category:Flora of the Kermadec Islands
414	L3	NZN	New Zealand North	North Island	Category:Flora of the North Island
415	L3	NZS	New Zealand South	South Island	Category:Flora of the South Island
416	L1	6	Pacific	Pacific	Category:Flora of the Pacific
417	L2	60	Southwestern Pacific		Category:Flora of the Southwestern Pacific
418	L3	FIJ	Fiji	Fiji	Category:Flora of Fiji
419	L3	GIL	Gilbert Is.	Gilbert Islands	Category:Flora of the Gilbert Islands
420	L3	HBI	Howland-Baker Is.	Howland and Baker Islands	Category:Flora of the Howland and Baker Islands
421	L3	NRU	Nauru	Nauru	Category:Flora of Nauru
422	L3	NUE	Niue	Niue	Category:Flora of Niue
423	L3	NWC	New Caledonia	New Caledonia	Category:Flora of New Caledonia
424	L3	PHX	Phoenix Is.	Phoenix Islands	Category:Flora of the Phoenix Islands
425	L3	SAM	Samoa	Samoa	Category:Flora of Samoa
426	L4	SAM-AS	American Samoa	American Samoa	Category:Flora of American Samoa
427	L4	SAM-WS	Samoa		Not used; see the parent Level 3 category
428	L3	SCZ	Santa Cruz Is.	Santa Cruz Islands	Category:Flora of the Santa Cruz Islands
429	L3	TOK	Tokelau-Manihiki	Tokelau, Manihiki	Category:Flora of Tokelau and Manihiki
430	L4	TOK-MA	Manihiki Is.	Manihiki Islands	Category:Flora of the Manihiki Islands
431	L4	TOK-SW	Swains I.	Swains Island	Category:Flora of Swains Island
432	L4	TOK-TO	Tokelau	Tokelau	Category:Flora of Tokelau
433	L3	TON	Tonga	Tonga	Category:Flora of Tonga
434	L3	TUV	Tuvalu	Tuvalu	Category:Flora of Tuvalu
435	L3	VAN	Vanuatu	Vanuatu	Category:Flora of Vanuatu
436	L3	WAL	Wallis-Futuna Is.	Wallis and Futuna	Category:Flora of Wallis and Futuna
437	L2	61	South-Central Pacific		Category:Flora of the south-central Pacific
438	L3	COO	Cook Is.	Cook Islands	Category:Flora of the Cook Islands
439	L3	EAS	Easter Is.	Easter Island	Category:Flora of Easter Island
440	L3	LIN	Line Is.	Line Islands	Category:Flora of the Line Islands
441	L4	LIN-KI	Kiribati Line Is.	Kiribati Line Islands	Category:Flora of the Kiribati Line Islands
442	L4	LIN-US	U.S. Line Is.	United States Line Islands	Category:Flora of the United States Line Islands
443	L3	MRQ	Marquesas	Marquesas Islands	Category:Flora of the Marquesas Islands
444	L3	PIT	Pitcairn Is.	Pitcairn Islands	Category:Flora of the Pitcairn Islands
445	L3	SCI	Society Is.	Society Islands	Category:Flora of the Society Islands
446	L3	TUA	Tuamotu	Tuamotus	Category:Flora of the Tuamotus
447	L3	TUB	Tubuai Is.	Tubuai Islands	Category:Flora of the Tubuai Islands
448	L2	62	Northwestern Pacific		Category:Flora of the Northwestern Pacific
449	L3	CRL	Caroline Is.	Caroline Islands	Category:Flora of the Caroline Islands
450	L4	CRL-MF	Micronesia Federated States	Federated States of Micronesia	Category:Flora of the Federated States of Micronesia
451	L4	CRL-PA	Palau	Palau	Category:Flora of Palau
452	L3	MCS	Marcus I.	Marcus Island	Category:Flora of Marcus Island
453	L3	MRN	Marianas	Mariana Islands	Category:Flora of the Mariana Islands
454	L4	MRN-GU	Guam	Guam	Category:Flora of Guam
455	L4	MRN-NM	Northern Marianas	Northern Mariana Islands	Category:Flora of the Northern Mariana Islands
456	L3	MRS	Marshall Is.	Marshall Islands	Category:Flora of the Marshall Islands
457	L3	WAK	Wake I.	Wake Island	Category:Flora of Wake Island
458	L2	63	North-Central Pacific		Not used; only contains Hawaii
459	L3	HAW	Hawaii	Hawaii	Category:Flora of Hawaii
460	L4	HAW-HI	Hawaiian Is.	Hawaiian Islands	Category:Flora of the Hawaiian Islands
461	L4	HAW-JI	Johnston I.	Johnston Island	Category:Flora of Johnston Island
462	L4	HAW-MI	Midway Is.	Midway Islands	Category:Flora of the Midway Islands
463	L1	7	Northern America	Northern America	Category:Flora of Northern America
464	L2	70	Subarctic America		Category:Flora of Subarctic America
465	L3	ALU	Aleutian Is.	Aleutian Islands	Category:Flora of the Aleutian Islands
466	L3	ASK	Alaska	Alaska	Category:Flora of Alaska
467	L3	GNL	Greenland	Greenland	Category:Flora of Greenland
468	L3	NUN	Nunavut	Nunavut	Category:Flora of Nunavut
469	L3	NWT	Northwest Territories	Northwest Territories	Category:Flora of the Northwest Territories
470	L3	YUK	Yukon	Yukon	Category:Flora of Yukon
471	L2	71	Western Canada	Western Canada	Category:Flora of Western Canada
472	L3	ABT	Alberta	Alberta	Category:Flora of Alberta
473	L3	BRC	British Columbia	British Columbia	Category:Flora of British Columbia
474	L3	MAN	Manitoba	Manitoba	Category:Flora of Manitoba
475	L3	SAS	Saskatchewan	Saskatchewan	Category:Flora of Saskatchewan
476	L2	72	Eastern Canada	Eastern Canada	Category:Flora of Eastern Canada
477	L3	LAB	Labrador	Labrador	Category:Flora of Labrador
478	L3	NBR	New Brunswick	New Brunswick	Category:Flora of New Brunswick
479	L3	NFL	Newfoundland		Category:Flora of Newfoundland
480	L4	NFL-NE	Newfoundland		Not used; see the parent Level 3 category
481	L4	NFL-SP	St. Pierre-Miquelon	Saint Pierre and Miquelon	Category:Flora of Saint Pierre and Miquelon
482	L3	NSC	Nova Scotia	Nova Scotia	Category:Flora of Nova Scotia
483	L3	ONT	Ontario	Ontario	Category:Flora of Ontario
484	L3	PEI	Prince Edward I.	Prince Edward Island	Category:Flora of Prince Edward Island
485	L3	QUE	Québec	Quebec	Category:Flora of Quebec
486	L2	73	Northwestern U.S.A.		Category:Flora of the Northwestern United States
487	L3	COL	Colorado	Colorado	Category:Flora of Colorado
488	L3	IDA	Idaho	Idaho	Category:Flora of Idaho
489	L3	MNT	Montana	Montana	Category:Flora of Montana
490	L3	ORE	Oregon	Oregon	Category:Flora of Oregon
491	L3	WAS	Washington	Washington (state)	Category:Flora of Washington (state)
492	L3	WYO	Wyoming	Wyoming	Category:Flora of Wyoming
493	L2	74	North-Central U.S.A.		Category:Flora of the North-Central United States
494	L3	ILL	Illinois	Illinois	Category:Flora of Illinois
495	L3	IOW	Iowa	Iowa	Category:Flora of Iowa
496	L3	KAN	Kansas	Kansas	Category:Flora of Kansas
497	L3	MIN	Minnesota	Minnesota	Category:Flora of Minnesota
498	L3	MSO	Missouri	Missouri	Category:Flora of Missouri
499	L3	NDA	North Dakota	North Dakota	Category:Flora of North Dakota
500	L3	NEB	Nebraska	Nebraska	Category:Flora of Nebraska
501	L3	OKL	Oklahoma	Oklahoma	Category:Flora of Oklahoma
502	L3	SDA	South Dakota	South Dakota	Category:Flora of South Dakota
503	L3	WIS	Wisconsin	Wisconsin	Category:Flora of Wisconsin
504	L2	75	Northeastern U.S.A.		Category:Flora of the Northeastern United States
505	L3	CNT	Connecticut	Connecticut	Category:Flora of Connecticut
506	L3	INI	Indiana	Indiana	Category:Flora of Indiana
507	L3	MAI	Maine	Maine	Category:Flora of Maine
508	L3	MAS	Massachusetts	Massachusetts	Category:Flora of Massachusetts
509	L3	MIC	Michigan	Michigan	Category:Flora of Michigan
510	L3	NWH	New Hampshire	New Hampshire	Category:Flora of New Hampshire
511	L3	NWJ	New Jersey	New Jersey	Category:Flora of New Jersey
512	L3	NWY	New York	New York (state)	Category:Flora of New York (state)
513	L3	OHI	Ohio	Ohio	Category:Flora of Ohio
514	L3	PEN	Pennsylvania	Pennsylvania	Category:Flora of Pennsylvania
515	L3	RHO	Rhode I.	Rhode Island	Category:Flora of Rhode Island
516	L3	VER	Vermont	Vermont	Category:Flora of Vermont
517	L3	WVA	West Virginia	West Virginia	Category:Flora of West Virginia
518	L2	76	Southwestern U.S.A.		Category:Flora of the Southwestern United States
519	L3	ARI	Arizona	Arizona	Category:Flora of Arizona
520	L3	CAL	California	California	Category:Flora of California
521	L3	NEV	Nevada	Nevada	Category:Flora of Nevada
522	L3	UTA	Utah	Utah	Category:Flora of Utah
523	L2	77	South-Central U.S.A.		Category:Flora of the South-Central United States
524	L3	NWM	New Mexico	New Mexico	Category:Flora of New Mexico
525	L3	TEX	Texas	Texas	Category:Flora of Texas
526	L2	78	Southeastern U.S.A.		Category:Flora of the Southeastern United States
527	L3	ALA	Alabama	Alabama	Category:Flora of Alabama
528	L3	ARK	Arkansas	Arkansas	Category:Flora of Arkansas
529	L3	DEL	Delaware	Delaware	Category:Flora of Delaware
530	L3	FLA	Florida	Florida	Category:Flora of Florida
531	L3	GEO	Georgia	Georgia (U.S. state)	Category:Flora of Georgia (U.S. state)
532	L3	KTY	Kentucky	Kentucky	Category:Flora of Kentucky
533	L3	LOU	Louisiana	Louisiana	Category:Flora of Louisiana
534	L3	MRY	Maryland	Maryland	Category:Flora of Maryland
535	L3	MSI	Mississippi	Mississippi	Category:Flora of Mississippi
536	L3	NCA	North Carolina	North Carolina	Category:Flora of North Carolina
537	L3	SCA	South Carolina	South Carolina	Category:Flora of South Carolina
538	L3	TEN	Tennessee	Tennessee	Category:Flora of Tennessee
539	L3	VRG	Virginia	Virginia	Category:Flora of Virginia
540	L3	WDC	District of Columbia	Washington, D.C.	Category:Flora of Washington, D.C.
541	L2	79	Mexico	Mexico	Category:Flora of Mexico
542	L3	MXC	Mexico Central		Category:Flora of Central Mexico
543	L4	MXC-DF	Mexico Distrito Federal	Mexico City	Category:Flora of Mexico City
544	L4	MXC-ME	Mexico State	State of Mexico	Category:Flora of the State of Mexico
545	L4	MXC-MO	Morelos	Morelos	Category:Flora of Morelos
546	L4	MXC-PU	Puebla	Puebla	Category:Flora of Puebla
547	L4	MXC-TL	Tlaxcala	Tlaxcala	Category:Flora of Tlaxcala
548	L3	MXE	Mexico Northeast		Category:Flora of Northeastern Mexico
549	L4	MXE-AG	Aguascalientes	Aguascalientes	Category:Flora of Aguascalientes
550	L4	MXE-CO	Coahuila	Coahuila	Category:Flora of Coahuila
551	L4	MXE-CU	Chihuahua	Chihuahua (state)	Category:Flora of Chihuahua (state)
552	L4	MXE-DU	Durango	Durango	Category:Flora of Durango
553	L4	MXE-GU	Guanajuato	Guanajuato	Category:Flora of Guanajuato
554	L4	MXE-HI	Hidalgo	Hidalgo (state)	Category:Flora of Hidalgo (state)
555	L4	MXE-NL	Nuevo León	Nuevo León	Category:Flora of Nuevo León
556	L4	MXE-QU	Querétaro	Querétaro	Category:Flora of Querétaro
557	L4	MXE-SL	San Luis Potosí	San Luis Potosí	Category:Flora of San Luis Potosí
558	L4	MXE-TA	Tamaulipas	Tamaulipas	Category:Flora of Tamaulipas
559	L4	MXE-ZA	Zacatecas	Zacatecas	Category:Flora of Zacatecas
560	L3	MXG	Mexico Gulf		Not used; only contains Veracruz
561	L4	MXG-VC	Veracruz	Veracruz	Category:Flora of Veracruz
562	L3	MXI	Mexican Pacific Is.		Category:Flora of Mexican Pacific Islands
563	L4	MXI-GU	Guadalupe I.	Guadalupe Island	Category:Flora of Guadalupe Island
564	L4	MXI-RA	Rocas Alijos	Rocas Alijos	Category:Flora of Rocas Alijos
565	L4	MXI-RG	Revillagigedo Is.	Revillagigedo Islands	Category:Flora of the Revillagigedo Islands
566	L3	MXN	Mexico Northwest		Category:Flora of Northwestern Mexico
567	L4	MXN-BC	Baja California	Baja California	Category:Flora of Baja California
568	L4	MXN-BS	Baja California Sur	Baja California Sur	Category:Flora of Baja California Sur
569	L4	MXN-SI	Sinaloa	Sinaloa	Category:Flora of Sinaloa
570	L4	MXN-SO	Sonora	Sonora	Category:Flora of Sonora
571	L3	MXS	Mexico Southwest		Category:Flora of Southwestern Mexico
572	L4	MXS-CL	Colima	Colima	Category:Flora of Colima
573	L4	MXS-GR	Guerrero	Guerrero	Category:Flora of Guerrero
574	L4	MXS-JA	Jalisco	Jalisco	Category:Flora of Jalisco
575	L4	MXS-MI	Michoacan	Michoacán	Category:Flora of Michoacán
576	L4	MXS-NA	Nayarit	Nayarit	Category:Flora of Nayarit
577	L4	MXS-OA	Oaxaca	Oaxaca	Category:Flora of Oaxaca
578	L3	MXT	Mexico Southeast		Category:Flora of Southeastern Mexico
579	L4	MXT-CA	Campeche	Campeche	Category:Flora of Campeche
580	L4	MXT-CI	Chiapas	Chiapas	Category:Flora of Chiapas
581	L4	MXT-QR	Quintana Roo	Quintana Roo	Category:Flora of Quintana Roo
582	L4	MXT-TB	Tabasco	Tabasco	Category:Flora of Tabasco
583	L4	MXT-YU	Yucatán	Yucatán	Category:Flora of Yucatán
584	L1	8	Southern America	Southern America	Category:Flora of Southern America
585	L2	80	Central America	Central America	Category:Flora of Central America
586	L3	BLZ	Belize	Belize	Category:Flora of Belize
587	L3	COS	Costa Rica	Costa Rica	Category:Flora of Costa Rica
588	L3	CPI	Central American Pacific Is.	Central American Pacific Islands	Category:Flora of the Central American Pacific Islands
589	L4	CPI-CL	Clipperton I.	Clipperton Island	Category:Flora of Clipperton Island
590	L4	CPI-CO	Cocos I.	Cocos Island	Category:Flora of Cocos Island
591	L4	CPI-MA	Malpelo I.	Malpelo Island	Category:Flora of Malpelo Island
592	L3	ELS	El Salvador	El Salvador	Category:Flora of El Salvador
593	L3	GUA	Guatemala	Guatemala	Category:Flora of Guatemala
594	L3	HON	Honduras	Honduras	Category:Flora of Honduras
595	L3	NIC	Nicaragua	Nicaragua	Category:Flora of Nicaragua
596	L3	PAN	Panama	Panama	Category:Flora of Panama
597	L2	81	Caribbean	Caribbean	Category:Flora of the Caribbean
598	L3	ARU	Aruba	Aruba	Category:Flora of Aruba
599	L3	BAH	Bahamas	The Bahamas	Category:Flora of the Bahamas
600	L3	BER	Bermuda	Bermuda	Category:Flora of Bermuda
601	L3	CAY	Cayman Is.	Cayman Islands	Category:Flora of the Cayman Islands
602	L3	CUB	Cuba	Cuba	Category:Flora of Cuba
603	L3	DOM	Dominican Republic	Dominican Republic	Category:Flora of the Dominican Republic
604	L3	HAI	Haiti	Haiti	Category:Flora of Haiti
605	L4	HAI-HA	Haiti		Not used; see the parent Level 3 category
606	L4	HAI-NI	Navassa I.	Navassa Island	Category:Flora of Navassa Island
607	L3	JAM	Jamaica	Jamaica	Category:Flora of Jamaica
608	L3	LEE	Leeward Is.	Leeward Islands	Category:Flora of the Leeward Islands
609	L4	LEE-AB	Antigua-Barbuda	Antigua and Barbuda	Category:Flora of Antigua and Barbuda
610	L4	LEE-AG	Anguilla	Anguilla	Category:Flora of Anguilla
611	L4	LEE-AV	Aves I.	Aves Island	Category:Flora of Aves Island
612	L4	LEE-BV	British Virgin Is.	British Virgin Islands	Category:Flora of the British Virgin Islands
613	L4	LEE-GU	Guadeloupe	Guadeloupe	Category:Flora of Guadeloupe
614	L4	LEE-MO	Montserrat	Montserrat	Category:Flora of Montserrat
615	L4	LEE-NL	Netherlands Leeward Is.	Netherlands Leeward Islands	Category:Flora of the Netherlands Leeward Islands
616	L4	LEE-SK	St. Kitts-Nevis	Saint Kitts and Nevis	Category:Flora of Saint Kitts and Nevis
617	L4	LEE-SM	St. Martin-St. Barthelemy	Saint Martin (island), Saint Barthélemy	Category:Flora of Saint Martin (island) and Saint Barthélemy
618	L4	LEE-VI	Virgin Is.	United States Virgin Islands	Category:Flora of the United States Virgin Islands
619	L3	NLA	Netherlands Antilles	Netherlands Antilles	Category:Flora of the Netherlands Antilles
620	L4	NLA-BO	Bonaire	Bonaire	Category:Flora of Bonaire
621	L4	NLA-CU	Curaçao	Curaçao	Category:Flora of Curaçao
622	L3	PUE	Puerto Rico	Puerto Rico	Category:Flora of Puerto Rico
623	L3	SWC	Southwest Caribbean		Category:Flora of the Southwest Caribbean
624	L4	SWC-CC	Colombian Caribbean Is.	Archipelago of San Andrés, Providencia and Santa Catalina	Category:Flora of the Colombian Caribbean Islands
625	L4	SWC-HC	Honduran Caribbean Is.	Bay Islands Department	Category:Flora of the Honduran Caribbean Islands
626	L4	SWC-NC	Nicaraguan Caribbean Is.	Nicaraguan Caribbean Islands	Category:Flora of the Nicaraguan Caribbean Islands
627	L3	TCI	Turks-Caicos Is.	Turks and Caicos Islands	Category:Flora of the Turks and Caicos Islands
628	L3	TRT	Trinidad-Tobago	Trinidad and Tobago	Category:Flora of Trinidad and Tobago
629	L3	VNA	Venezuelan Antilles	Federal Dependencies of Venezuela excluding Isla Aves	Category:Flora of the Venezuelan Antilles
630	L3	WIN	Windward Is.	Windward Islands	Category:Flora of the Windward Islands
631	L4	WIN-BA	Barbados	Barbados	Category:Flora of Barbados
632	L4	WIN-DO	Dominica	Dominica	Category:Flora of Dominica
633	L4	WIN-GR	Grenada	Grenada	Category:Flora of Grenada
634	L4	WIN-MA	Martinique	Martinique	Category:Flora of Martinique
635	L4	WIN-SL	St. Lucia	Saint Lucia	Category:Flora of Saint Lucia
636	L4	WIN-SV	St. Vincent	Saint Vincent and the Grenadines	Category:Flora of Saint Vincent and the Grenadines
637	L2	82	Northern South America		Category:Flora of northern South America
638	L3	FRG	French Guiana	French Guiana	Category:Flora of French Guiana
639	L3	GUY	Guyana	Guyana	Category:Flora of Guyana
640	L3	SUR	Suriname	Suriname	Category:Flora of Suriname
641	L3	VEN	Venezuela	Venezuela	Category:Flora of Venezuela
642	L2	83	Western South America		Category:Flora of western South America
643	L3	BOL	Bolivia	Bolivia	Category:Flora of Bolivia
644	L3	CLM	Colombia	Colombia	Category:Flora of Colombia
645	L3	ECU	Ecuador	Ecuador	Category:Flora of Ecuador
646	L3	GAL	Galápagos	Galápagos Islands	Category:Flora of the Galápagos Islands
647	L3	PER	Peru	Peru	Category:Flora of Peru
648	L2	84	Brazil	Brazil	Category:Flora of Brazil
649	L3	BZC	Brazil West-Central	West-Central Brazil	Category:Flora of West-Central Brazil
650	L4	BZC-DF	Brasilia Distrito Federal	Federal District (Brazil)	Category:Flora of the Federal District (Brazil)
651	L4	BZC-GO	Goias	Goiás	Category:Flora of Goiás
652	L4	BZC-MS	Mato Grosso do Sul	Mato Grosso do Sul	Category:Flora of Mato Grosso do Sul
653	L4	BZC-MT	Mato Grosso	Mato Grosso	Category:Flora of Mato Grosso
654	L3	BZE	Brazil Northeast	Northeast Brazil	Category:Flora of Northeast Brazil
655	L4	BZE-AL	Alagoas	Alagoas	Category:Flora of Alagoas
656	L4	BZE-BA	Bahia	Bahia	Category:Flora of Bahia
657	L4	BZE-CE	Ceara	Ceará	Category:Flora of Ceará
658	L4	BZE-FN	Fernando de Noronha	Fernando de Noronha	Category:Flora of Fernando de Noronha
659	L4	BZE-MA	Maranhao	Maranhão	Category:Flora of Maranhão
660	L4	BZE-PB	Paraiba	Paraíba	Category:Flora of Paraíba
661	L4	BZE-PE	Pernambuco	Pernambuco	Category:Flora of Pernambuco
662	L4	BZE-PI	Piaui	Piauí	Category:Flora of Piauí
663	L4	BZE-RN	Rio Grande do Norte	Rio Grande do Norte	Category:Flora of Rio Grande do Norte
664	L4	BZE-SE	Sergipe	Sergipe	Category:Flora of Sergipe
665	L3	BZL	Brazil Southeast	Southeast Brazil	Category:Flora of Southeast Brazil
666	L4	BZL-ES	Espirito Santo	Espírito Santo	Category:Flora of Espírito Santo
667	L4	BZL-MG	Minas Gerais	Minas Gerais	Category:Flora of Minas Gerais
668	L4	BZL-RJ	Rio de Janeiro	Rio de Janeiro (state)	Category:Flora of Rio de Janeiro (state)
669	L4	BZL-SP	Sao Paulo	São Paulo (state)	Category:Flora of São Paulo (state)
670	L4	BZL-TR	Trindade	Trindade and Martin Vaz	Category:Flora of Trindade and Martin Vaz
671	L3	BZN	Brazil North	North Brazil	Category:Flora of North Brazil
672	L4	BZN-AC	Acre	Acre (state)	Category:Flora of Acre (state)
673	L4	BZN-AM	Amazonas	Amazonas (Brazilian state)	Category:Flora of Amazonas (Brazilian state)
674	L4	BZN-AP	Amapa	Amapá	Category:Flora of Amapá
675	L4	BZN-PA	Para	Pará	Category:Flora of Pará
676	L4	BZN-RM	Roraima	Roraima	Category:Flora of Roraima
677	L4	BZN-RO	Rondonia	Rondônia	Category:Flora of Rondônia
678	L4	BZN-TO	Tocantins	Tocantins	Category:Flora of Tocantins
679	L3	BZS	Brazil South	South Brazil	Category:Flora of South Brazil
680	L4	BZS-PR	Parana	Paraná (state)	Category:Flora of Paraná (state)
681	L4	BZS-RS	Rio Grande do Sul	Rio Grande do Sul	Category:Flora of Rio Grande do Sul
682	L4	BZS-SC	Santa Catarina	Santa Catarina (state)	Category:Flora of Santa Catarina (state)
683	L2	85	Southern South America		Category:Flora of southern South America
684	L3	AGE	Argentina Northeast		Category:Flora of Northeast Argentina
685	L4	AGE-BA	Buenos Aires	Buenos Aires Province	Category:Flora of Buenos Aires Province
686	L4	AGE-CD	Cordoba	Córdoba Province, Argentina	Category:Flora of Córdoba Province, Argentina
687	L4	AGE-CH	Chaco	Chaco Province	Category:Flora of Chaco Province
688	L4	AGE-CN	Corrientes	Corrientes Province	Category:Flora of Corrientes Province
689	L4	AGE-DF	Argentina Distrito Federal	Federal District, Argentina	Category:Flora of the Federal District, Argentina
690	L4	AGE-ER	Entre Rios	Entre Ríos Province	Category:Flora of Entre Ríos Province
691	L4	AGE-FO	Formosa	Formosa Province	Category:Flora of Formosa Province
692	L4	AGE-LP	La Pampa	La Pampa Province	Category:Flora of La Pampa Province
693	L4	AGE-MI	Misiones	Misiones Province	Category:Flora of Misiones Province
694	L4	AGE-SF	Santa Fe	Santa Fe Province	Category:Flora of Santa Fe Province
695	L3	AGS	Argentina South		Category:Flora of South Argentina
696	L4	AGS-CB	Chubut	Chubut Province	Category:Flora of Chubut Province
697	L4	AGS-NE	Neuquen	Neuquén Province	Category:Flora of Neuquén Province
698	L4	AGS-RN	Rio Negro	Río Negro Province	Category:Flora of Río Negro Province
699	L4	AGS-SC	Santa Cruz	Santa Cruz Province, Argentina	Category:Flora of Santa Cruz Province, Argentina
700	L4	AGS-TF	Tierra del Fuego (Argentina)	Tierra del Fuego Province, Argentina	Category:Flora of Tierra del Fuego Province, Argentina
701	L3	AGW	Argentina Northwest		Category:Flora of Northwest Argentina
702	L4	AGW-CA	Catamarca	Catamarca Province	Category:Flora of Catamarca Province
703	L4	AGW-JU	Jujuy	Jujuy Province	Category:Flora of Jujuy Province
704	L4	AGW-LR	La Rioja	La Rioja Province, Argentina	Category:Flora of La Rioja Province, Argentina
705	L4	AGW-ME	Mendoza	Mendoza Province	Category:Flora of Mendoza Province
706	L4	AGW-SA	Salta	Salta Province	Category:Flora of Salta Province
707	L4	AGW-SE	Santiago del Estero	Santiago del Estero Province	Category:Flora of Santiago del Estero Province
708	L4	AGW-SJ	San Juan	San Juan Province, Argentina	Category:Flora of San Juan Province, Argentina
709	L4	AGW-SL	San Luis	San Luis Province	Category:Flora of San Luis Province
710	L4	AGW-TU	Tucuman	Tucumán Province	Category:Flora of Tucumán Province
711	L3	CLC	Chile Central		Category:Flora of central Chile
712	L4	CLC-BI	Biobio	Bío Bío Region	Category:Flora of Bío Bío Region
713	L4	CLC-CO	Coquimbo	Coquimbo Region	Category:Flora of Coquimbo Region
714	L4	CLC-LA	La Araucania	Araucanía Region	Category:Flora of Araucanía Region
715	L4	CLC-MA	Maule	Maule Region	Category:Flora of Maule Region
716	L4	CLC-OH	O'Higgins	O'Higgins Region	Category:Flora of O'Higgins Region
717	L4	CLC-SA	Santiago	Santiago Metropolitan Region	Category:Flora of Santiago Metropolitan Region
718	L4	CLC-VA	Valparaiso	Valparaíso Region	Category:Flora of Valparaíso Region
719	L3	CLN	Chile North		Category:Flora of northern Chile
720	L4	CLN-AN	Antofagasta	Antofagasta Region	Category:Flora of Antofagasta Region
721	L4	CLN-AT	Atacama	Atacama Region	Category:Flora of Atacama Region
722	L4	CLN-TA	Tarapaca	Tarapacá Region	Category:Flora of Tarapacá Region
723	L3	CLS	Chile South		Category:Flora of southern Chile
724	L4	CLS-AI	Aisen	Aysén Region	Category:Flora of Aysén Region
725	L4	CLS-LL	Los Lagos	Los Lagos Region	Category:Flora of Los Lagos Region
726	L4	CLS-MG	Magellanes	Magallanes Region	Category:Flora of Magallanes Region
727	L3	DSV	Desventurados Is.	Desventuradas Islands	Category:Flora of the Desventuradas Islands
728	L3	JNF	Juan Fernández Is.	Juan Fernández Islands	Category:Flora of the Juan Fernández Islands
729	L3	PAR	Paraguay	Paraguay	Category:Flora of Paraguay
730	L3	URU	Uruguay	Uruguay	Category:Flora of Uruguay
731	L1	9	Antarctic	Antarctic	Category:Flora of the Antarctic
732	L2	90	Subantarctic Islands	Subantarctic islands	Category:Flora of the subantarctic islands
733	L3	ASP	Amsterdam-St.Paul Is.	Île Amsterdam, Île Saint-Paul	Category:Flora of the Amsterdam and Saint Paul islands
734	L3	BOU	Bouvet I.	Bouvet Island	Category:Flora of Bouvet Island
735	L3	CRZ	Crozet Is.	Crozet Islands	Category:Flora of the Crozet Islands
736	L3	FAL	Falkland Is.	Falkland Islands	Category:Flora of the Falkland Islands
737	L3	HMD	Heard-McDonald Is.	Heard Island and McDonald Islands	Category:Flora of Heard Island and McDonald Islands
738	L3	KEG	Kerguelen	Kerguelen Islands	Category:Flora of the Kerguelen Islands
739	L3	MAQ	Macquarie Is.	Macquarie Island	Category:Flora of Macquarie Island
740	L3	MPE	Marion-Prince Edward Is.	Prince Edward Islands	Category:Flora of the Prince Edward Islands
741	L3	SGE	South Georgia	South Georgia Island	Category:Flora of South Georgia Island
742	L3	SSA	South Sandwich Is.	South Sandwich Islands	Category:Flora of the South Sandwich Islands
743	L3	TDC	Tristan da Cunha	Tristan da Cunha	Category:Flora of Tristan da Cunha
744	L2	91	Antarctic Continent		Not used; contains only Antarctica
745	L3	ANT	Antarctica	Antarctica	Category:Flora of Antarctica

== See also ==
- Biogeography
- Phytochorion
- Phytogeography
- Wikipedia categories for flora distributions using the World Geographical Scheme for Recording Plant Distributions
- Flora categories with a WGSRPD code
