= George Shelvocke =

English naval officer and privateer

- Born: Baptised 1 April 1675; Shropshire, England
- Died: 30 November 1742 (aged 67); London, England
- Occupations: Naval officer and privateer
- Known for: Inspiring The Rime of the Ancient Mariner

George Shelvocke (baptised 1 April 1675 – 30 November 1742) was an English Royal Navy officer and later privateer who in 1726 wrote the memoir A Voyage Round the World by Way of the Great South Sea based on his exploits. It includes an account of how his second captain, Simon Hatley, shot an albatross off Cape Horn, an incident which provided the dramatic motive in Samuel Taylor Coleridge's poem The Rime of the Ancient Mariner.

== Early life and naval career ==
Born into a farming family in Shropshire and christened at St Mary's, Shrewsbury, on 1 April 1675, Shelvocke joined the Royal Navy when he was fifteen years old. During two long wars with France he rose through the ranks to become a sailing master and finally second lieutenant of a flagship serving under Rear Admiral Sir Thomas Dilkes in the Mediterranean. However, when war ended in 1713 he was beached without even half-pay for support. By the time he was offered a commission as captain of the privateering ship Speedwell, he was living in poverty.

== Privateering voyage ==
Yellow 'Jolly Roger' pirate flag described by George Shelvocke in "A Voyage Round the World".

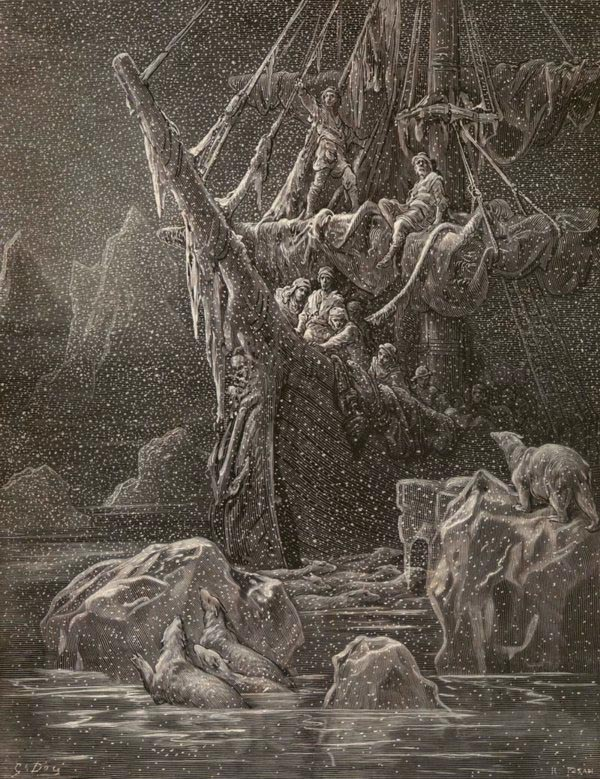
Sailors in cold waters of the South Sea gawk at sea lions off their bow, in The Rime of the Ancient Mariner. Engraving by Gustave Doré.

Alongside the Success, captained by John Clipperton, the Speedwell was involved in a 1719 expedition to loot Spanish ships and settlements along the Pacific coast of the Americas. The English had just renewed hostilities with Spain in the War of the Quadruple Alliance, and the ships carried letters of marque which gave them official permission to wage war on the Spanish and keep the profits. Shelvocke broke away from Clipperton shortly after leaving British waters and appears to have avoided contact as much as possible for the rest of the voyage.

On 25 May 1720 the Speedwell was wrecked on the island of Más a Tierra in the Juan Fernández Archipelago. Shelvocke and his crew were marooned there for five months but managed to build a 20-ton boat using some timbers and hardware salvaged from the wreck, in addition to wood obtained from locally felled trees. Leaving the island on 6 October, they transferred into their first prize, renamed the Happy Return, and resumed privateering, despite the war having ended in February and rendered their letter of marque invalid. They continued up the coast of South America from Chile to Baja California, capturing more vessels along the way, before crossing the Pacific to Macao and returning to England in July 1722.

== Later life ==
In England Shelvocke was arrested on charges of fraud at the instigation of the principal shareholders of the voyage, though he avoided conviction through out-of-court settlements with two of the complainants. They suspected, probably with reason, that he had failed to let them know about a significant portion of the loot obtained from the voyage, and planned to keep it for himself and other members of his crew. The self-justifying version of events given by Shelvocke in the memoir A Voyage Round the World by Way of the Great South Sea was disputed by some who had accompanied him on that expedition, in particular by his captain of marines, William Betagh.

Shelvocke nevertheless went on to re-establish his reputation and died on 30 November 1742 at the age of 67, a wealthy man as a result of his buccaneering activity. His chest tomb (since removed) in the churchyard of St Nicholas, Deptford, London, by the east wall eulogised "a gentleman of great abilities in his profession and allowed to have been one of the bravest and most accomplished seamen of his time." A wall tablet in the chancel commemorates his son, also George Shelvocke, who died in 1760 and accompanied his father on the journey round the world before becoming Secretary of the General Post Office and a Fellow of the Royal Society.

== Influence on Coleridge ==
In his book Shelvocke described an event wherein his second captain, Simon Hatley, shot a black albatross while the Speedwell was attempting to round Cape Horn in severe storms. Hatley took the giant sea bird to be a bad omen, and hoped that by killing it he might bring about a break in the weather. Some seventy years later the episode would become the inspiration for the central plot device in Samuel Taylor Coleridge's narrative poem The Rime of the Ancient Mariner. Coleridge's friend and fellow poet William Wordsworth shared the following reminiscences on the origins of the poem:

Much the greatest part of the story was Mr Coleridge's invention; but certain parts I myself suggested: for example, some crime was to be committed which should bring upon the old navigator, as Coleridge afterwards delighted to call him, the spectral persecution, as a consequence of that crime, and his own wanderings. I had been reading in Shelvock's Voyages a day or two before that while doubling Cape Horn they frequently saw albatrosses in that latitude, the largest sort of sea-fowl, some extending their wings twelve or fifteen feet. "Suppose," I said, "you represent him as having killed one of these birds on entering the South Sea, and that the tutelary spirits of those regions take upon them to avenge the crime. The incident was thought fit for the purpose and adopted accordingly."
