= Simon Hatley =

English sailor

- Born: 27 March 1685; Woodstock, Oxfordshire, England
- Died: after 1723
- Occupation: Sailor
- Known for: Inspiring The Rime of the Ancient Mariner

Simon Hatley (27 March 1685 – after 1723) was an English sailor involved in two hazardous privateering voyages to the South Pacific Ocean. On the second voyage, with his ship beset by storms south of Cape Horn, Hatley shot an albatross, an incident immortalised by Samuel Taylor Coleridge in his 1798 poem The Rime of the Ancient Mariner.

Born in 1685 in Woodstock, Oxfordshire, Hatley went to sea in 1708 as part of Woodes Rogers's expedition against the Spanish. Rogers circumnavigated the world, but Hatley was captured on the coast of present-day Ecuador and imprisoned in Lima, capital of the Viceroyalty of Peru, where he was tortured by the Inquisition. He was released and returned to Great Britain in 1713.

Hatley's second voyage, under George Shelvocke, was the source of the albatross incident, and also ended with his capture by the Spanish. As Hatley had, at Shelvocke's direction, looted a Portuguese vessel on the coast of Brazil, the Spanish this time held him as a pirate, though ultimately they released him again, deciding that Shelvocke was the more culpable party. Hatley returned to Britain in 1723, and sailed to Jamaica to avoid trial for piracy. His fate thereafter is unknown.

In 1797, William Wordsworth, having read Shelvocke's account of that voyage, suggested Hatley's shooting of an albatross as the basis of a contemplated joint work with Coleridge. Wordsworth dropped out of the project soon after, but Coleridge continued, and the poem was published in Lyrical Ballads (1798), containing poems by both men, giving Hatley a place in literary history.

== Early life ==
The oldest child in a family of hatters, Simon Hatley was born on 27 March 1685 (Note: New Style dating used throughout. Since Hatley was born in March, his year of birth was 1684, Old Style. See Fowke, p. 230 n.8.) in Woodstock, Oxfordshire, England during the late Restoration period. His parents were Symon and Mary Hatley. Simon Hatley's mother's name at birth was Mary Herbert and, her son later stated while imprisoned by the Spanish, she was a Catholic. Her faith and name at birth possibly meant she was related to the earls of Pembroke, for they were also Catholic with the family name Herbert. The Hatley family was a prosperous one, owning a large house and three other rental properties on the High Street. The residence was pulled down and rebuilt in 1704, after Simon had left home. According to Simon Hatley's sole biographer, Robert Fowke, in 2010, "fittingly for the family of a son with piratical leanings, it was said to have been built with stone pilfered from the nearby construction site for Blenheim Palace." (Note: The three-storey house on Woodstock High Street can still be found by walking towards the Town Hall, "just past Freeman's the Butcher", at No. 6. See Fowke, p. 8)

Literate in Latin as well as English, young Simon would have attended the Woodstock Grammar School up the road from where he lived. Although as the oldest son of a prosperous merchant, he could probably have followed in his father's trade, some time around 1699 he was apprenticed as a pilot, completing his formal training in Bristol by 1706 at the latest. In this era, the accounts of maritime explorations were widely published and read, and Hatley may have gained a love of adventure from them.

== Career ==
Much of what is known about Hatley's subsequent life is in connection with the two privateering voyages that he made to the Pacific coast of South America. Privateers were men who sailed in armed merchant ships carrying letters of marque from their government authorising them to plunder foreign enemies, keeping any profits for themselves and their ships' owners. The first such voyage made by Hatley was under the command of Captain Woodes Rogers during the War of the Spanish Succession, which found Britain and Spain on opposing sides. In 1708, at the age of twenty-three, he signed on as third mate (a junior officer position) of the Duchess, the smaller of Rogers's two ships, the other being the Duke.

Rogers's vessels were then being readied in Bristol for a long and difficult journey to the Pacific coast of South America. The purpose of the Rogers expedition was to go around Cape Horn into the South Pacific, to damage Spanish settlements and interests along the South American Pacific coast, and to capture booty for their own profit, including the large treasure galleons that sailed from Manila to Mexico. The two ships were to be crammed with men, supplies to maintain them, and with guns and powder, for the success of the expedition depended on being able to outfight those vessels they sought to capture and plunder.

=== Voyage with Rogers ===
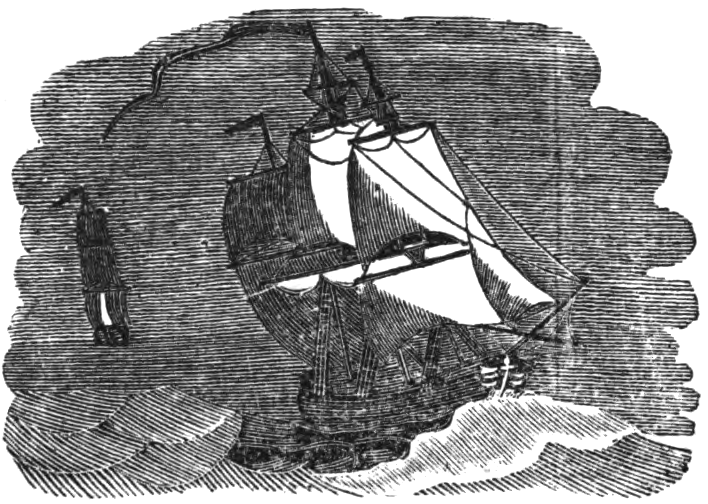
The Duke and Duchess, British privateers that sailed from Bristol against the Spanish in 1708

With a war on, finding qualified sailors was difficult, and in July 1708, Hatley was sent to Dublin to fill out the ships' crews, with the aid of an assistant and a Dubliner, Humphry French. The Duke and the Duchess sailed from Bristol on 1 August 1708, and Hatley joined the Duchess when the vessels called at Cork three days later. Many of Hatley's recruits were not sailors, but at the time government regulations limited to one-half the proportion of professional seamen private vessels such as Rogers's could have in their crews, to preserve some for ships of the Royal Navy. A total of 150 men joined at Cork, where the ships remained until the end of August, making good losses of 40 by desertion. When the ships sailed on 1 September, there were 183 in the Duke and 151 in the Duchess.

On 8 September, the ships captured a Swedish vessel bound for Cádiz, but as Britain was not at war with Sweden and searchers could find no contraband aboard, Rogers had to let her go. This provoked a near-mutiny on board the Duke, as the sailors felt they had been cheated of plunder to which they were entitled. Hatley and the Duchess were not directly involved, but he could not have avoided awareness of the problems, as there were tensions aboard the smaller vessel as well. The expedition captured a small Spanish ship off Tenerife, but released her in exchange for supplies. Items taken from that ship were auctioned off among the sailors, and Hatley purchased a pair of silk hose.

After beating their way around Cape Horn, the two vessels stopped at the Juan Fernández Islands, off Chile, for resupply. The islands were believed to be uninhabited, but as the ships approached on 31 January 1709, sailors saw a fire on shore. The landing party were surprised to be met by Alexander Selkirk, a Scottish sailor who had been marooned there by his captain more than four years before and who was overjoyed at being rescued. The Duke's pilot, William Dampier, had also been on that earlier cruise with Selkirk, though in a different ship. Rogers made Selkirk second mate of the Duke. The ships lay in Cumberland Bay for almost two weeks, allowing for repair, resupply and some time ashore.

Having resupplied and otherwise prepared, the expedition began to raid Spanish commerce. To assure fairness, the committee of expedition members who advised Rogers decided that the officers and men of each ship would each appoint two agents, one to remain on the vessel, the other to transfer to the other ship. This meant a partisan would be able to monitor what plunder was captured by the other ship. Hatley was elected an agent for Duchess's officers, and transferred to the Duke. Thus, for a time, Hatley, who would inspire Samuel Taylor Coleridge's albatross-shooting Ancient Mariner, Selkirk, probably the original for Daniel Defoe's Robinson Crusoe and Dampier, possibly the inspiration for Jonathan Swift's Lemuel Gulliver (of Gulliver's Travels), shared the same vessel.

Opportunities for plundering were soon found; they captured several vessels, while negotiating the ransom of the town of Guayaquil in present-day Ecuador by threatening to burn it. Hatley played his part in these exploits, being in the Duchess's pinnace as part of a planned boarding party, when the expedition's two ships fought and captured a Spanish vessel known as the Havre de Grace in the Gulf of Guayaquil on 15 April, a sea battle that killed Rogers's brother John. When the main part of the expedition moved to capture Guayaquil on 18 April, Hatley was among those left behind on captured ships to guard the Spanish prisoners. With water becoming short, Hatley and another officer were detailed to command two of the captured ships (Hatley's was a barque) and go to Puna Island to collect water and seek news of the expedition. There they met Rogers and learned that the attack on Guayaquil had been successful, although not as profitable as hoped.

Rogers's expedition ultimately circumnavigated the globe, but Hatley did not make it that far. He remained in command of his barque as the Rogers expedition re-entered the Pacific Ocean proper. With water short and many sailors ill from a disease contracted in Guayaquil, the search for fresh water became increasingly desperate. But Hatley's ship went astray, and despite Rogers's efforts to search for her, was not seen again. Lanterns were hung and guns fired, in the hopes he would perceive them, but to no avail. Hatley had perhaps six sailors under him, and as about the same number of prisoners. It was thought that the prisoners had murdered him and his crew. Wrote Rogers in his account of the expedition, "we all bewailed Mr Hatley and were afraid he was lost."

=== First captivity, return to Britain ===
With food short—one of the prisoners died—Hatley's crew forced him to make for the coast of what is now Ecuador. There, in late May 1709, a native spotted the ship, and Hatley and his crew were captured. The natives abused them, but a priest intervened, probably saving their lives. Hatley and his men were transported south to Lima, now in Peru, where they were confined in the prison on the Plaza Real. He was tortured by the Inquisition, once being taken to a gallows with one of his fellows and half-strangled before being cut down. Hatley arranged to smuggle several letters out, but only one survives, dated 6 November 1709, and addressed to the sponsors of the Rogers voyage, in Bristol. This one reached Britain, and may have been the first news to reach Bristol about the fate of the Rogers expedition. Under the persuasion of the Inquisition, Hatley accepted conversion to Catholicism in 1710, and was freed, though required to remain in Peru, that December. The merchant sponsors of the Rogers expedition petitioned the British Government and, in 1711, Lord Dartmouth instructed the new governor of Jamaica to do what he could for British prisoners in the hands of the Spanish. In 1713, with peace between Spain and Britain restored, Hatley was allowed to leave, and returned to his native land, having learned Spanish. The Rogers expedition had returned in 1711, and the sale of the goods was still ongoing, as was litigation. Hatley was paid £180 10s 2d (Note: One hundred and eighty pounds, ten shillings, two pence) in August 1713 and later that year an additional forty pounds for his role in the taking of the Havre de Grace.

Symon Hatley had died in 1712, leaving property in Woodstock to his son Simon, though with a life estate to his widow, giving her the income from the rental properties for her lifetime. In 1718, mother and son sold those properties for £140.

=== Shelvocke expedition ===
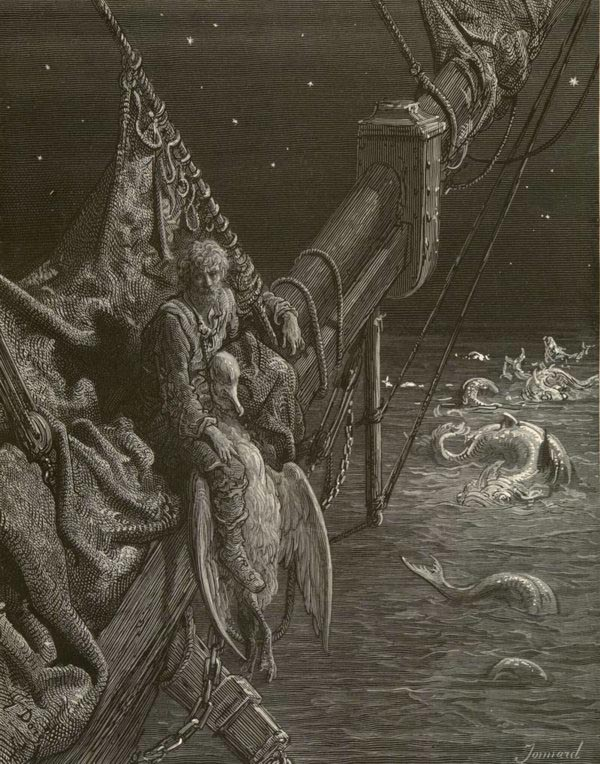
1876 Gustave Doré illustration for The Rime of the Ancient Mariner

When the War of the Quadruple Alliance (1717–1720) brought a renewal of hostilities between Britain and Spain, Hatley joined another privateering expedition as second captain of the Speedwell, under George Shelvocke, the expedition leader. As Hatley was already familiar with their South Pacific destination, his knowledge and experience made him a desirable hire for the voyage. The Speedwell was the smaller of the two ships that went on the expedition; the larger was named Success.

Delayed by difficulties over their privateering commissions and a lack of favourable winds, the expedition left Plymouth on 13 February 1719. The ships became separated and sailed independently after that; Shelvocke's conduct in doing so was subsequently the cause of litigation. On 4 June, at Cape Frio in Brazil, the Speedwell encountered a Portuguese ship. In spite of the fact that the Portuguese were allies of Britain, Shelvocke sent Hatley across with an armed crew. They left with gold and other valuables. The ship anchored at the present-day site of Florianópolis, Brazil, from 20 June to mid-August. During that time, the crew repaired the vessel and gathered supplies in preparation for the Cape Horn passage. At the end of July, Shelvocke recorded, the crew demanded new terms for division of the expedition's plunder, saying Rogers's crew had never received the full measure of what was due them. Shelvocke blamed Hatley for this episode, though whether it was a mutiny or done with the leader's connivance is uncertain, as the result left Shelvocke in control of how winnings would be divided and with a greater share of the treasure. Hatley also got into trouble with the locals, insulting one of their leaders, and Shelvocke, in his journal, accused Hatley of abusing the women.

We had continued squalls of sleet, snow, and rain, and the heavens were perpetually hid from us by gloomy dismal clouds. One would think it impossible any thing could live in so rigid a climate; and, indeed, we all observed, we had not the sight of one fish of any kind since we were come to the southward of Strait le Maire, nor one sea bird, except a disconsolate black albatross, who accompanied us several days, hovering about as if he had lost himself; till Simon Hatley, my second captain, observing, in one of his melancholy fits, that this bird was always hovering near us, imagined, from his colour, that it might be some ill omen, and being encouraged in his superstition by the continued series of contrary tempestuous winds, that had oppressed us ever since we had got into this sea, he, after some fruitless attempts, at length shot the albatross, perhaps not doubting that we should have a fair wind after it.

— George Shelvocke, A Voyage Round the World by Way of the Great South Sea (1726), pp. 72–73

In his journal entry for 1 October 1719 (see adjacent quotation), Shelvocke recorded the incident, the shooting of the albatross, for which Hatley joined his former shipmate Selkirk in being immortalised in literature. This took place about 400 miles (640 km) south of Cape Horn. According to Shelvocke's account, Hatley shot the bird believing it portended ill-luck, and in the hope of fairer winds. Fowke noted that at that time there was no taboo against killing albatrosses, and this was something invented by Coleridge when he wrote of the incident. Sailors sometimes baited them with food, though the oily taste of their flesh was not greatly liked. A biographer of Rogers, Bryan Little, suggested that the harsh treatment of Hatley by the Spanish in Lima may have contributed to the "melancholy fits" during which he shot the albatross. The winds did not calm, but the ship was able to round Cape Horn, battling northward along the coast of Chile, through stormy weather.

Once clear of the weather, the Speedwell began raiding along the coast, capturing several small vessels, of which one, renamed Mercury, Hatley was placed in command. At Hatley's suggestion, since he knew the coast, Shelvocke had him operate independently to capture small vessels near the coast of Peru and Ecuador. On 9 March 1720, the Mercury's crew saw a ship that they initially assumed to be the Speedwell. It was too late to run when they realised it was a Spanish warship, the Brilliant. Hatley sent those sailors who were obviously British in appearance below, trying to make it appear his ship was still under Spanish control. The stratagem failed when three sailors, British by their dress, suddenly emerged from below decks, and the Brilliant fired, slightly wounding Hatley. The British sailors, including Hatley, were captured and landed at Paita, and transported 600 miles (970 km) to Lima.

By this time Britain and Spain were again at peace, and all the prisoners but Hatley were soon released; he was kept chained and in solitary confinement. They accused him of piracy because of the looting of the Portuguese ship at Cape Frio; a purse had been found among his possessions with 96 moidores, and he faced hanging or hard labour in the mines. There was uncertainty as to whether the Lima authorities could try him for a crime against the Portuguese, and with Shelvocke's reputation poor even among the British (he was arrested and briefly imprisoned for the incident upon his return, though acquitted due to lack of witnesses), they decided the expedition commander was probably the responsible party. Hatley was released in 1723.

What became of Hatley after 1723 is uncertain. He faced the possibility of a piracy prosecution in England because of the Cape Frio incident. Immediately upon his return, he sailed for Jamaica, then a den of pirates, without presenting himself to the owners of the Shelvocke expedition. Nothing is known of him thereafter; Fowke speculated he continued as a sailor.

== Literary influence ==
According to William Wordsworth, the poem The Rime of the Ancient Mariner was conceived while he and Coleridge were walking together in the Quantock Hills of Somerset in November 1797. The two were considering the fate of Cain, condemned to wander the earth for killing his brother Abel, for a contemplated joint poetic work. The discussion turned to a book that Wordsworth was reading, Shelvocke's A Voyage Round the World by Way of the Great South Sea, in which the incident of Hatley shooting the albatross is told. "Much the greatest part of the story was Coleridge's invention", Wordsworth later wrote, though it was Wordsworth's idea that the main plot device of the narrative should involve the killing of an albatross in the South Sea, for which "the tutelary spirits of these regions take upon them to avenge the crime." Wordsworth soon found their poetic styles incompatible and withdrew from the project, but Coleridge continued. The Rime of the Ancient Mariner was published in their joint work, Lyrical Ballads, in 1798.

"God save thee, ancient Mariner!
From the fiends, that plague thee thus!—
Why look'st thou so?"—"With my cross-bow
I shot the ALBATROSS."

— Samuel Taylor Coleridge, The Rime of the Ancient Mariner (1798)

Tim Beattie, in his book on the privateering voyages of the early 18th century, deemed Shelvocke an unreliable witness, placing in doubt whether the albatross incident actually occurred, but considered Coleridge's use of it a testimonial to the enduring appeal of the books recounting the sea voyages. Hatley's shooting of an albatross differs in some regards from the Ancient Mariner's. Hatley shot the bird in the hopes of fairer winds; no motive is given for the Mariner's deed. The shooting by the Mariner is followed by retribution, the hanging of the albatross around the Mariner's neck, and other torments. Hatley underwent trials and tribulations after shooting the albatross, but these were at the hands of the Spanish and were not directly connected to the killing of the albatross. The Mariner is subsequently shriven by the Hermit. According to Fowke, there was "no forgiveness for Hatley and clearly there were things to forgive. He took ship for Jamaica fearing a second trial."

== Bibliography ==
- Beattie, Tim (2015). British Privateering Voyages of the Early Eighteenth Century. London: Boydell Press. ISBN 978-1-78327-020-0.
- Fowke, Robert (2010). The Real Ancient Mariner: Pirates and Poesy on the South Sea. Bishop's Castle, Shrops.: Travelbrief Publications. ISBN 978-09-548-3514-9.
- Holmes, Richard (1989). Coleridge: Early Visions, 1772–1804. New York: Pantheon Books. ISBN 978-067-08-0444-3.
- Little, Bryan (1960). Crusoe's Captain. London: Odhams Press Ltd. OCLC 460308156.
- Rogers, Woodes (1712). A Cruising Voyage Round the World: First to the South-Sea, Thence to the East-Indies, and Homewards by the Cape of Good Hope. London: A. Bell. OCLC 433917082.
- Severin, Tim (2002). In Search of Robinson Crusoe. New York: Basic Books. ISBN 978-046-50-7698-7.
- Shelvocke, George (1726). A Voyage Round the World by Way of the Great South Sea. London: J. Senex. OCLC 185192893.
- Woodard, Colin (2007). The Republic of Pirates. Boston, Massachusetts: Harcourt Trade. ISBN 978-0-15-101302-9.
