= Rocas Alijos =

Series of islets

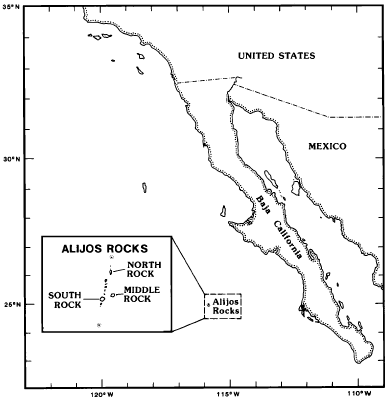
overview map with detail inset

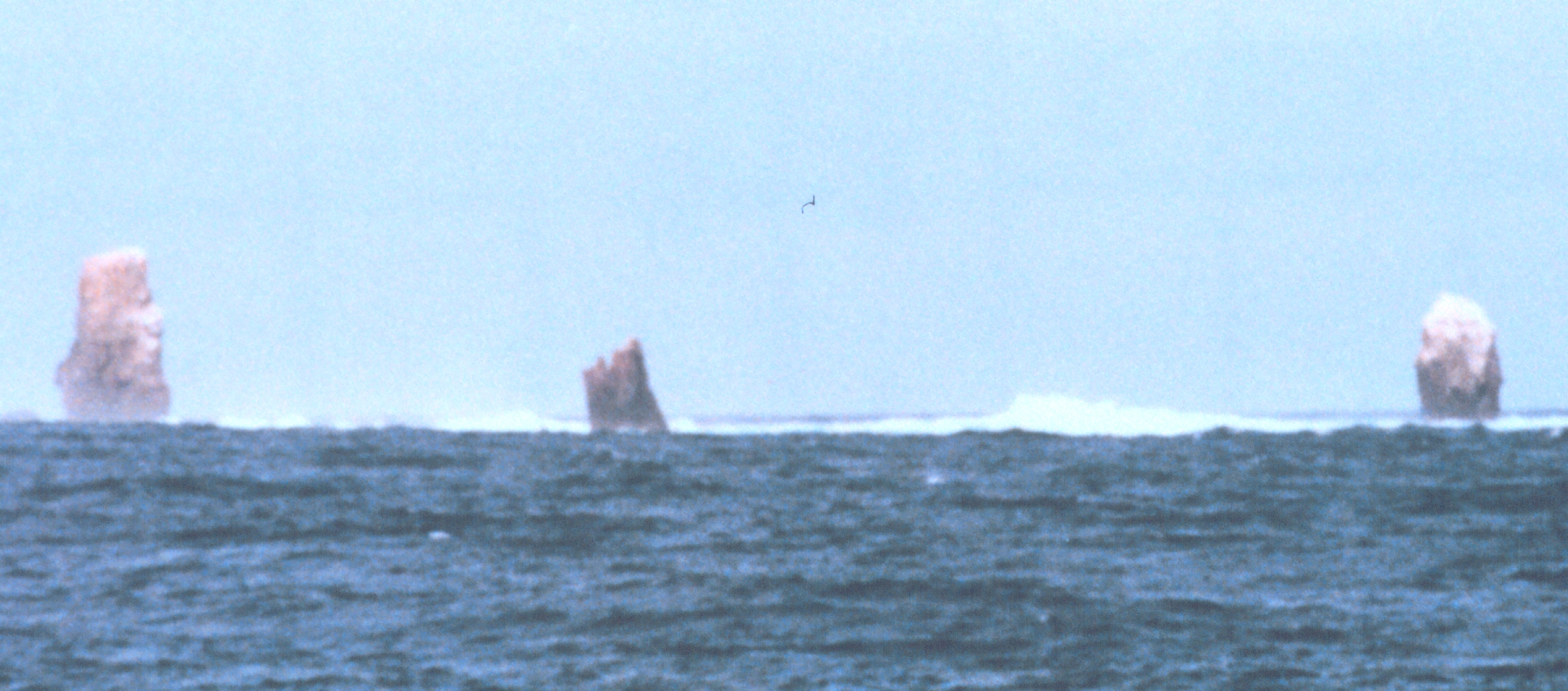
Rocas Alijos from the East (South Rock to the left)

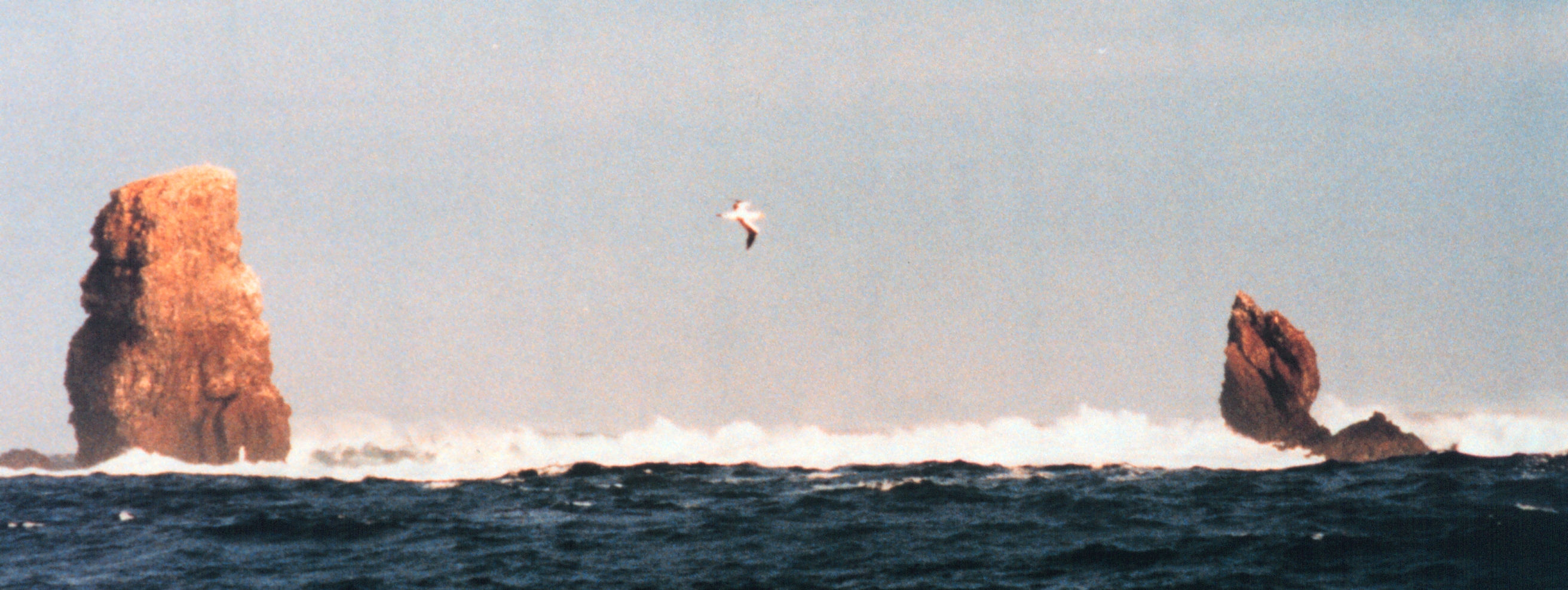
Rocas Alijos - South Rock (left) and Middle Rock

Rocas Alijos, or Escollos Alijos (English: Alijos Rocks) are a series of tiny, steep, uninhabited, and barren volcanic islets or above-water (as well as below-water) rocks in the Pacific Ocean at 24°57′31″N 115°44′59″W. They are part of Comondú municipality of the Mexican state of Baja California Sur, and situated about 300 kilometres (190 mi) west of the mainland. The total surface area is 0.012 square kilometres (0.0046 sq mi).

The group consists of three principal rocks and numerous smaller ones. South Rock, the largest of the group, is 34 metres (112 ft) high, with a diameter of only 14 metres (46 ft) (position 24°57′03″N 115°44′55″W). Middle Rock is 18 metres (59 ft) high and about 10 metres (33 ft) in diameter. North Rock, 200 metres (660 ft) north of South Rock, is 22 metres (72 ft) high, with a diameter of 12 metres (39 ft). The rocks in between those are either submerged or so low that they are barely visible among the heavily breaking waves.

The rocks have been known since the early Spanish history of Mexico; they can be found on a map from 1598. Others have described their official discovery as coming in 1605. The first description is from 1704, by pirate John Clipperton. The first exact description was made by a Spanish sailor in 1791. South Rock was climbed for the first time in 1990 by an expedition (October 31 through November 7, 1990) under the leadership of Robert Schmieder, who edited a monograph about the rocks.

The group is located at the transition zone between two major biologic provinces, at a latitude where the Pacific Current turns westward to form the North Pacific trans-oceanic current. The rocks are nesting sites of many seabirds.

The two other Mexican island groups in the Pacific Ocean that are not on the continental shelf are Guadalupe Island and Revillagigedo Islands.

== Fauna ==
The breeding marine avifauna of Alijos Rocks currently consists of Leach's storm-petrel (a presumed breeder, probably a few pairs), red-billed tropicbird (14 birds), masked booby (100), and sooty tern (250). The magnificent frigatebird is a regular winter visitor but probably does not breed. The Laysan albatross is currently an annual visitor to Alijos Rocks during its winter breeding season, and may start to nest there in the near future.
