= The Rime of the Ancient Mariner =

1798 poem by Samuel Taylor Coleridge

- by Samuel Taylor Coleridge
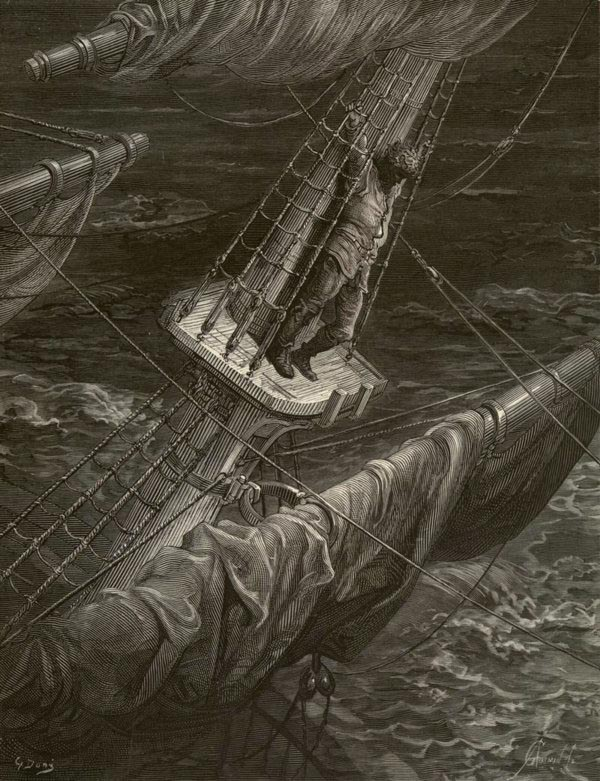
- The Mariner up on the mast in a storm. One of the wood-engraved illustrations by Gustave Doré of the poem.
- Original title: The Rime of the Ancyent Marinere
- Written: 1797–98
- First published in: Lyrical Ballads
- Country: Great Britain
- Language: English
- Subject(s): fate, doom, seafaring, superstition
- Form: Ballad
- Meter: iambic tetrameter and iambic trimeter
- Rhyme scheme: abcb
- Publisher: J. & A. Arch
- Publication date: 1798
- Media type: print
- Lines: 625

Full text
- The Rime of the Ancient Mariner at Wikisource

The Rime of the Ancient Mariner (originally The Rime of the Ancyent Marinere), written by English poet Samuel Taylor Coleridge in 1797–98 and published in 1798 in the first edition of Lyrical Ballads, is a poem that recounts the experiences of a sailor who has returned from a long sea voyage. Some modern editions use a revised version printed in 1817 that featured a gloss.

The Rime of the Ancient Mariner (1798 edition)

The poem tells of the mariner stopping a man who is on his way to a wedding ceremony so that the mariner can share his story. The Wedding-Guest's reaction turns from amusement to impatience to fear to fascination as the mariner's story progresses, as can be seen in the language style; Coleridge uses narrative techniques such as personification and repetition to create a sense of danger, the supernatural, or serenity, depending on the mood in different parts of the poem.

The Rime is Coleridge's longest major poem. It is often considered a signal shift to modern poetry and the beginning of British Romantic literature.

== Synopsis ==
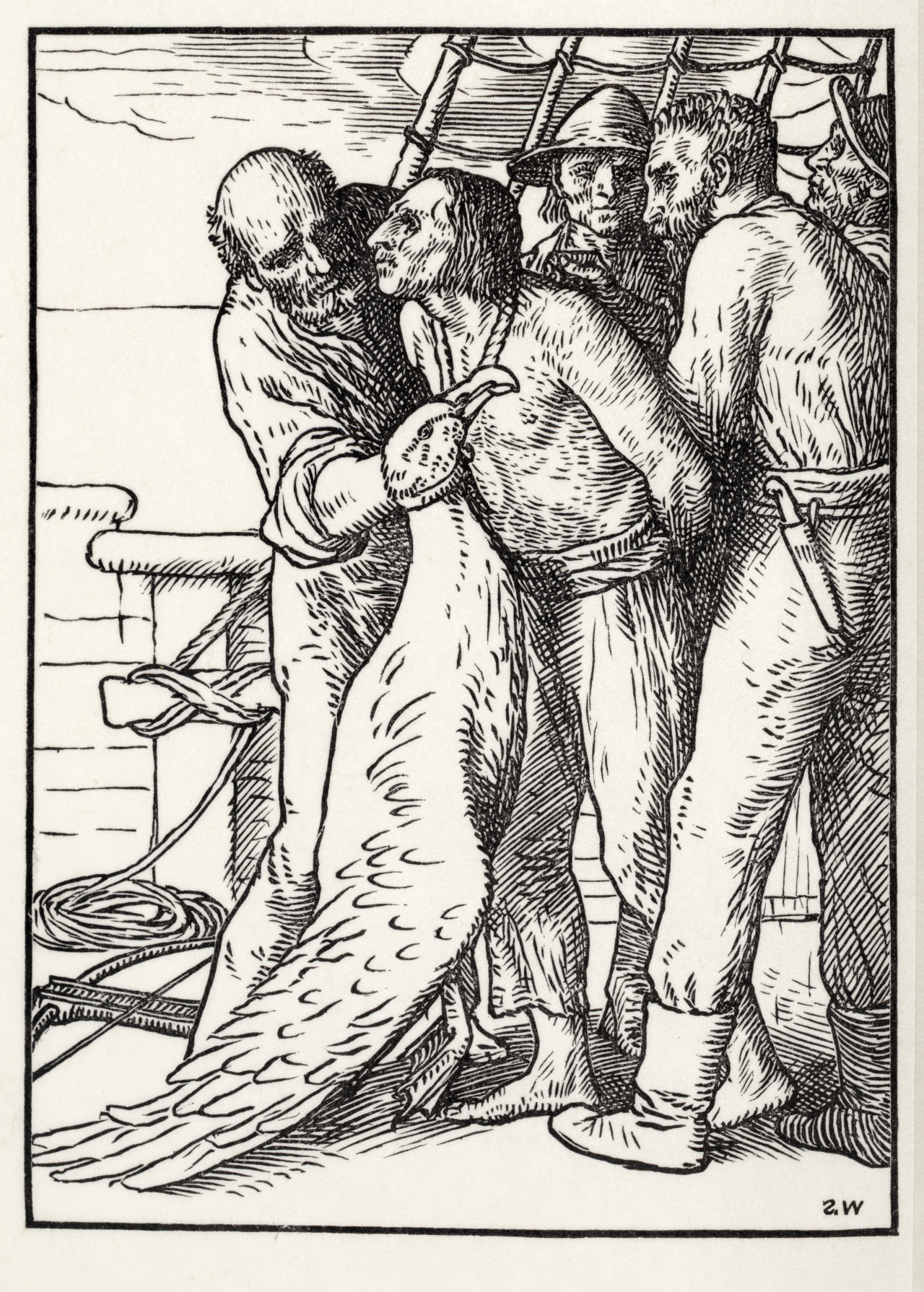
Frontispiece by William Strang for a 1903 edition of Coleridge's poem.

The poem begins with an old grey-bearded sailor, the Mariner, stopping a guest at a wedding ceremony to tell him a story of a sailing voyage he took long ago. The Wedding-Guest is at first reluctant to listen, as the ceremony is about to begin, but the mariner's glittering eye captivates him.

The mariner's tale begins with his ship departing on its journey. Despite initial good fortune, the ship is driven south by a storm and eventually reaches the icy waters of the Antarctic. An albatross appears and leads the ship out of the ice jam where it is stuck, but even as the albatross is fed and praised and played with by the ship's crew, the mariner shoots the bird:

[...] With my cross-bow
I shot the Albatross.

— lines 81–82

The crew is angry with the mariner, believing the albatross brought the south wind that led them out of the Antarctic. However, the sailors change their minds when the weather becomes warmer and the mist disappears:

'Twas right, said they, such birds to slay,
That bring the fog and mist.

— lines 101–102

They soon find that they made a grave mistake in supporting this crime, as it arouses the wrath of spirits who then pursue the ship "from the land of mist and snow"; the south wind that had initially blown them north now sends the ship into uncharted waters near the equator, where it is becalmed:

Day after day, day after day,
We stuck, nor breath nor motion;
As idle as a painted ship
Upon a painted ocean.

Water, water, every where,
And all the boards did shrink;
Water, water, every where,
Nor any drop to drink.

The very deep did rot: Oh Christ!
That ever this should be!
Yea, slimy things did crawl with legs
Upon the slimy sea.

— lines 115–126

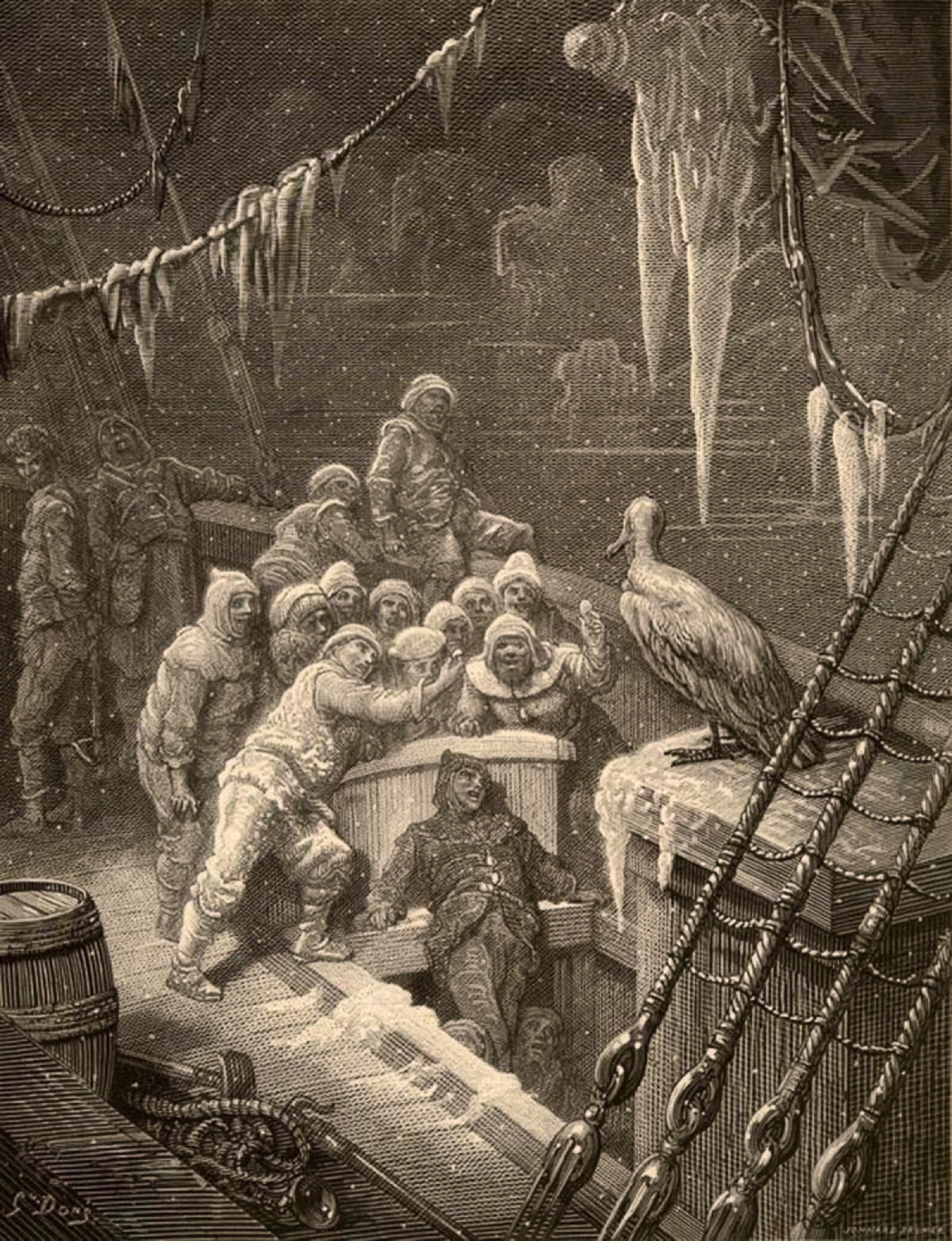
Engraving by Gustave Doré for an 1876 edition of the poem. The Albatross depicts 17 sailors on the deck of a wooden ship facing an albatross. Icicles hang from the rigging.

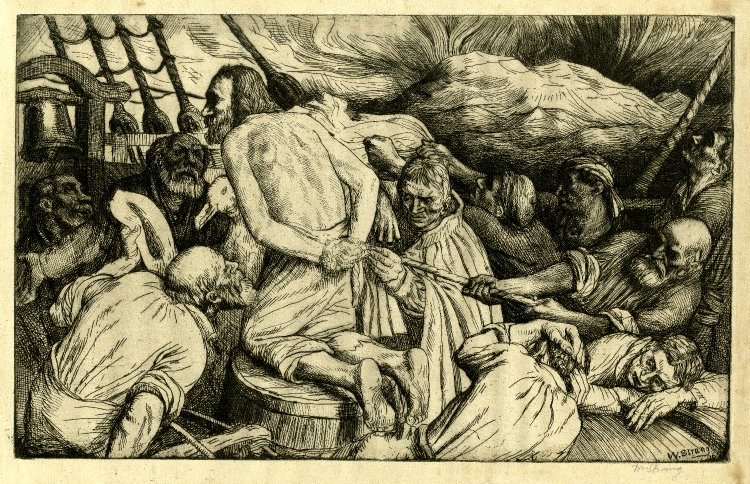
"The Albatross about my Neck was Hung", etching by William Strang, published 1896

The sailors change their minds again and blame the mariner for the torment of their thirst. In anger, the crew forces the mariner to wear the dead albatross about his neck, perhaps to illustrate the burden he must suffer from killing it, or perhaps as a sign of regret:

Ah! well a-day! what evil looks
Had I from old and young!
Instead of the cross, the Albatross
About my neck was hung.

— lines 139–142

After a "weary time", the ship encounters a ghostly hulk. On board are Death (a skeleton) and the "Night-mare Life-in-Death", a deathly pale woman, who are playing dice for the souls of the crew. With a roll of the dice, Death wins the lives of the crew members and Life-in-Death the life of the mariner, a prize she considers more valuable. Her name is a clue to the mariner's fate: he will endure a fate worse than death as punishment for his killing of the albatross. One by one, all of the crew members die, but the mariner lives on, seeing for seven days and nights the curse in the eyes of the crew's corpses, whose last expressions remain upon their faces:

Four times fifty living men,
(And I heard nor sigh nor groan)
With heavy thump, a lifeless lump,
They dropped down one by one.

The souls did from their bodies fly,—
They fled to bliss or woe!
And every soul, it passed me by,
Like the whizz of my cross-bow!

— lines 216–223

Eventually, this stage of the mariner's curse is lifted after he begins to appreciate the many sea creatures swimming in the water. Despite his cursing them as "slimy things" earlier in the poem, he suddenly sees their true beauty and blesses them ("A spring of love gush'd from my heart, And I bless'd them unaware"). As he manages to pray, the albatross falls from his neck and his guilt is partially expiated. It then starts to rain, and the bodies of the crew, possessed by good spirits, rise again and help steer the ship. In a trance, the mariner hears two spirits discussing his voyage and penance, and learns that the ship is being powered supernaturally:

The air is cut away before,
And closes from behind.

— lines 424–425

Finally the mariner wakes from his trance and comes in sight of his homeland, but is initially uncertain as to whether or not he is hallucinating:

Oh! dream of joy! is this indeed
The light-house top I see?
Is this the hill? is this the kirk?
Is this mine own countree?

We drifted o'er the harbour-bar,
And I with sobs did pray—
O let me be awake, my God!
Or let me sleep alway.

— lines 464–471

The rotten remains of the ship sink in a whirlpool, leaving only the mariner behind. A hermit on the mainland who has spotted the approaching ship comes to meet it in a boat, rowed by a pilot and his boy. When they pull the mariner from the water, they think he is dead, but when he opens his mouth, the pilot shrieks with fright. The hermit prays, and the mariner picks up the oars to row. The pilot's boy laughs, thinking the mariner is the devil, and cries, "The Devil knows how to row". Back on land, the mariner is compelled by "a woful agony" to tell the hermit his story.

As penance for shooting the albatross, the mariner, driven by the agony of his guilt, is now forced to wander the earth, telling his story over and over, and teaching a lesson to those he meets:

He prayeth best, who loveth best
All things both great and small;
For the dear God who loveth us,
He made and loveth all.

— lines 614–617

After finishing his story, the mariner leaves, and the wedding-guest returns home, waking the next morning "a sadder and a wiser man".

The poem received mixed reviews from critics, and Coleridge was once told by the publisher that most of the book's sales were to sailors who thought it was a naval songbook. Coleridge made several modifications to the poem over the years. In the second edition of Lyrical Ballads, published in 1800, he replaced many of the archaic words.

== Inspiration for the poem ==
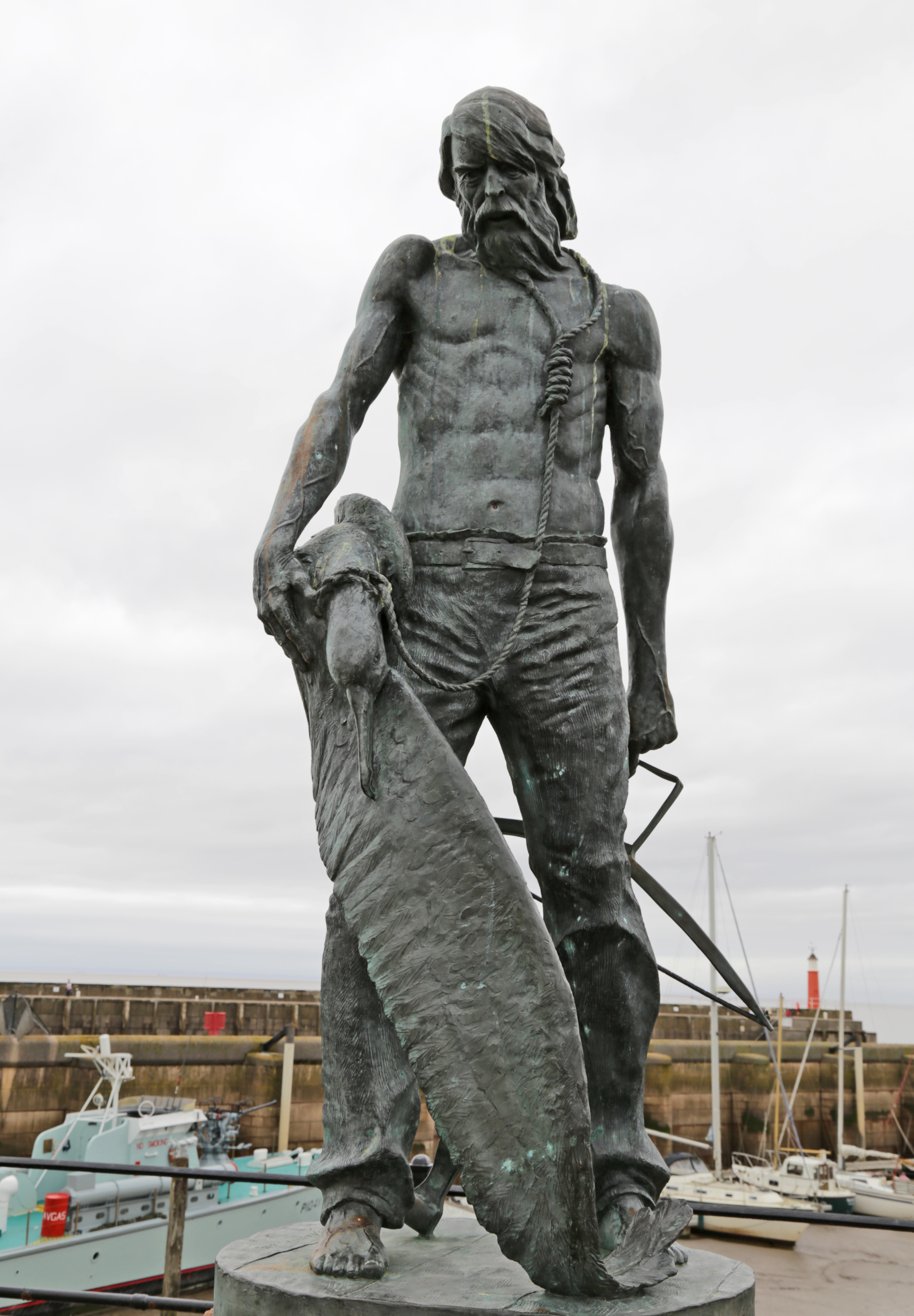
Commemorative statue at Watchet, Somerset: the albatross hangs on a rope looped around the ancient mariner's neck. "Ah! well a-day! what evil looks Had I from old and young! Instead of the cross, the Albatross About my neck was hung."

The poem may have been inspired by James Cook's second voyage of exploration (1772–1775) of the South Seas and the Pacific Ocean; Coleridge's tutor, William Wales, was the astronomer on Cook's flagship and had a strong relationship with Cook. On this second voyage Cook crossed three times into the Antarctic Circle to determine whether the fabled great southern continent Terra Australis existed. (Note: "On 26 January 1774 he crossed into the Antarctic Circle for the third time (having done so a second time the previous month) and four days later, at 71°10' S, 106°54' W, achieved his farthest south.") Critics have also suggested that the poem may have been inspired by the voyage of Thomas James into the Arctic.

According to Wordsworth, the poem was inspired while Coleridge, Wordsworth, and Wordsworth's sister Dorothy were on a walking tour through the Quantock Hills in Somerset. The discussion had turned to a book that Wordsworth was reading, that described a privateering voyage in 1719 during which a melancholy sailor, Simon Hatley, shot a black albatross. (Note: "We all observed, that we had not the sight of one fish of any kind, since we were come to the Southward of the straits of le Mair, nor one sea-bird, except a disconsolate black Albatross, who accompanied us for several days ... till Hattley, (my second Captain) observing, in one of his melancholy fits, that this bird was always hovering near us, imagin'd, from his colour, that it might be some ill omen ... He, after some fruitless attempts, at length, shot the Albatross, not doubting we should have a fair wind after it.")

As they discussed Shelvocke's book, Wordsworth proffered the following developmental critique to Coleridge, which importantly contains a reference to tutelary spirits: "Suppose you represent him as having killed one of these birds on entering the south sea, and the tutelary spirits of these regions take upon them to avenge the crime." By the time the trio finished their walk, the poem had taken shape.

Bernard Martin argues in The Ancient Mariner and the Authentic Narrative that Coleridge was also influenced by the life of Anglican clergyman John Newton, who had a near-death experience aboard a slave ship.

The poem may also have been inspired by the legends of the Wandering Jew, who was forced to wander the earth until Judgement Day for a terrible crime, found in Charles Maturin's Melmoth the Wanderer, M. G. Lewis' The Monk (a 1796 novel Coleridge reviewed), and the legend of the Flying Dutchman.

It is argued that the harbour at Watchet in Somerset was the primary inspiration for the poem, although some time before, John Cruikshank, a local acquaintance of Coleridge's, had related a dream about a skeleton ship crewed by spectral sailors. In September 2003, a commemorative statue, by Alan B. Herriot of Penicuik, Scotland, was unveiled at Watchet harbour.

== Coleridge's comments ==
In Biographia Literaria, Coleridge wrote:

The thought suggested itself (to which of us I do not recollect) that a series of poems might be composed of two sorts. In the one, incidents and agents were to be, in part at least, supernatural, and the excellence aimed at, was to consist in the interesting of the affections by the dramatic truth of such emotions, as would naturally accompany such situations, supposing them real. And real in this sense they have been to every human being who, from whatever source of delusion, has at any time believed himself under supernatural agency. For the second class, subjects were to be chosen from ordinary life ... In this idea originated the plan of the Lyrical Ballads; in which it was agreed, that my endeavours should be directed to persons and characters supernatural, or at least Romantic; yet so as to transfer from our inward nature a human interest and a semblance of truth sufficient to procure for these shadows of imagination that willing suspension of disbelief for the moment, which constitutes poetic faith. ... With this view I wrote the Ancient Mariner.

In Table Talk, Coleridge was reported as saying:

Mrs. Barbauld once told me that she admired The Ancient Mariner very much, but that there were two faults in it – it was improbable, and had no moral. As for the probability, I owned that that might admit some question; but as to the want of a moral, I told her that in my own judgement the poem had too much; and that the only, or chief fault, if I might say so, was the obtrusion of the moral sentiment so openly on the reader as a principle or cause of action in a work of such pure imagination. It ought to have had no more moral than the Arabian Nights' tale of the merchant's sitting down to eat dates by the side of a well, and throwing the shells aside, and lo! a genie starts up, and says he must kill the aforesaid merchant, because one of the date shells had, it seems, put out the eye of the genie's son.

== Wordsworth's comments ==
Wordsworth wrote to Joseph Cottle in 1799:

From what I can gather it seems that the Ancient Mariner has upon the whole been an injury to the volume, I mean that the old words and the strangeness of it have deterred readers from going on. If the volume should come to a second Edition I would put in its place some little things which would be more likely to suit the common taste.

However, when Lyrical Ballads was reprinted, Wordsworth included it despite Coleridge's objections, writing:

The Poem of my Friend has indeed great defects; first, that the principal person has no distinct character, either in his profession of Mariner, or as a human being who having been long under the control of supernatural impressions might be supposed himself to partake of something supernatural; secondly, that he does not act, but is continually acted upon; thirdly, that the events having no necessary connection do not produce each other; and lastly, that the imagery is somewhat too laboriously accumulated. Yet the Poem contains many delicate touches of passion, and indeed the passion is every where true to nature, a great number of the stanzas present beautiful images, and are expressed with unusual felicity of language; and the versification, though the metre is itself unfit for long poems, is harmonious and artfully varied, exhibiting the utmost powers of that metre, and every variety of which it is capable. It therefore appeared to me that these several merits (the first of which, namely that of the passion, is of the highest kind) gave to the Poem a value which is not often possessed by better Poems.

== Early criticisms ==
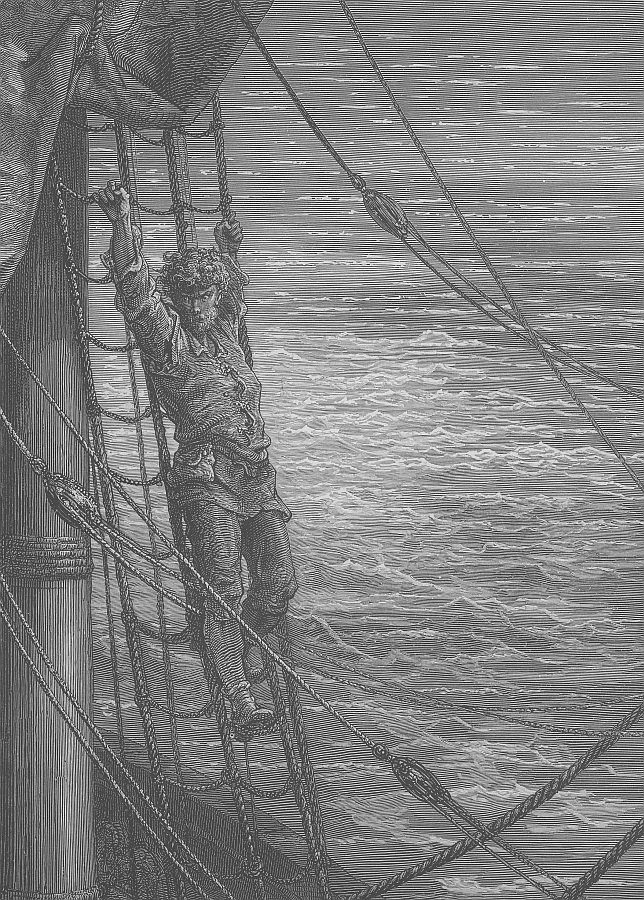
Illustration by Gustave Doré, 1878

Upon its release, the poem was criticized for being obscure and difficult to read. The use of archaic spelling of words was seen as not in keeping with Wordsworth's claims of using common language. Criticism was renewed again in 1815–1816, when Coleridge added marginal notes to the poem that were also written in an archaic style. These notes or glosses, placed next to the text of the poem, ostensibly interpret the verses much like marginal notes found in the Bible. There were many opinions on why Coleridge inserted the gloss.

Charles Lamb, who had deeply admired the original for its attention to "Human Feeling", claimed that the gloss distanced the audience from the narrative, weakening the poem's effects. The entire poem was first published in the collection of Lyrical Ballads. Another version of the poem was published in the 1817 collection entitled Sibylline Leaves (see 1817 in poetry).

== Interpretations ==
On a surface level the poem explores a violation of nature and the resulting psychological effects on the mariner and on all those who hear him. According to Jerome McGann the poem is like a salvation story. The poem's structure is multi-layered text based on Coleridge's interest in higher criticism. "Like the Iliad or Paradise Lost or any great historical product, the Rime is a work of trans-historical rather than so-called universal significance. This verbal distinction is important because it calls attention to a real one. Like The Divine Comedy or any other poem, the Rime is not valued or used always or everywhere or by everyone in the same way or for the same reasons."

Whalley (1947) suggests that the Ancient Mariner is an autobiographical portrait of Coleridge himself, comparing the mariner's loneliness with Coleridge's own feelings of loneliness expressed in his letters and journals.

In Sexual Personae: Art and Decadence from Nefertiti to Emily Dickinson (1990), Camille Paglia applies a conventionally gendered sexual Freudian psychoanalysis and suggests that the Bridegroom, Wedding-Guest and Mariner all represent aspects of Coleridge: "The Bridegroom is a masculine persona" that is "integrated with society", and that the Wedding-Guest is an adolescent seeking "sexual fulfilment and collective joy", that must merge with the Bridegroom but is unable to because of the appearance of a spectre-self, a "male heroine" who "luxuriates in passive suffering".

== Versions of the poem ==
Coleridge often made changes to his poems and The Rime of the Ancient Mariner was no exception – he produced at least eighteen different versions over the years. He regarded revision as an essential part of creating poetry. The first published version of the poem was in Lyrical Ballads in 1798. The second edition of this anthology in 1800 included a revised text, requested by Coleridge, in which some of the language and many of the archaic spellings were modernised. He also reduced the title to The Ancient Mariner but for later versions the longer title was restored. The 1802 and 1805 editions of Lyrical Ballads had minor textual changes. In 1817 Coleridge's Sibylline Leaves anthology included a new version with an extensive marginal gloss, written by the poet. The last version he produced was in 1834.

Traditionally literary critics regarded each revision of a text by an author as producing a more authoritative version and Coleridge published somewhat revised versions of the poem in his Poetical Works anthology editions of 1828, 1829, and lastly in 1834—the year of his death. More recently scholars look to the earliest version, even in manuscript, as the most authoritative but for this poem no manuscript is extant. Hence the editors of the edition of Collected Poems published in 1972 used the 1798 version but made their own modernisation of the spelling and they added some passages taken from later editions.

The 1817 edition, the one most used today and the first to be published under Coleridge's own name rather than anonymously, added a new Latin epigraph but the major change was the addition of the gloss that has a considerable effect on the way the poem reads. Coleridge's grandson E.H. Coleridge produced a detailed study of the published versions of the poem. Over all, Coleridge's revisions resulted in the poem losing thirty-nine lines and an introductory prose "Argument", and gaining fifty-eight glosses and a Latin epigraph.

In general the anthologies included printed lists of errata and, in the case of the particularly lengthy list in Sibylline Leaves, the list was included at the beginning of the volume. Such changes were often editorial rather than merely correcting errors. Coleridge also made handwritten changes in printed volumes of his work, particularly when he presented them as gifts to friends.

== In popular culture ==
In addition to being referred to in several other notable works, due to the popularity of the poem, the phrase "albatross around one's neck" has become an English-language idiom referring to "a heavy burden of guilt that becomes an obstacle to success".

The phrase "Water, water, every where, / Nor any drop to drink" has appeared widely in popular culture, but usually given in a more natural modern phrasing as "Water, water, everywhere / But not a drop to drink"; some such appearances have, in turn, played on the frequency with which these lines are misquoted.

== See also ==
- Albatross (metaphor)

== Sources ==
- Gardner, M. (1965). The Annotated Ancient Mariner. New York, NY: Clarkson Potter, reprinted by Prometheus Books. ISBN 1-59102-125-1.
- Lowes, J.L. (1927). The Road to Xanadu – a study in the ways of the imagination. Houghton Mifflin.
- Scott, Grant F. (2010). ""The many men so beautiful": Gustave Doré's illustrations to The Rime of the Ancient Mariner". Romanticism. 16 (1): 1–24. doi:10.3366/E1354991X1000084X.
