= John Clipperton =

English privateer who fought 18th century Spanish sailors in the Pacific

- Born: c. 1676; Great Yarmouth, Norfolk, England
- Died: June 1722 (aged 45/46); Galway, Ireland
- Occupation: Privateer
- Known for: Namesake of Clipperton Island

John Clipperton (c. 1676 – June 1722) was an English privateer who fought against the Spanish in the 18th century. He was involved in two buccaneering expeditions to the South Pacific—the first led by William Dampier in 1703, and the second under his own command in 1719. He used Clipperton Island in the eastern Pacific Ocean as a base for his raids.

== Early life and personality ==
John Clipperton was born in Great Yarmouth, Norfolk, in about 1676 into a family of seafarers. In his younger days he sailed all the seas of Europe, made one trip to the West Indies and one around the world. He was an able pilot and seaman.

== Privateering voyage with Dampier ==
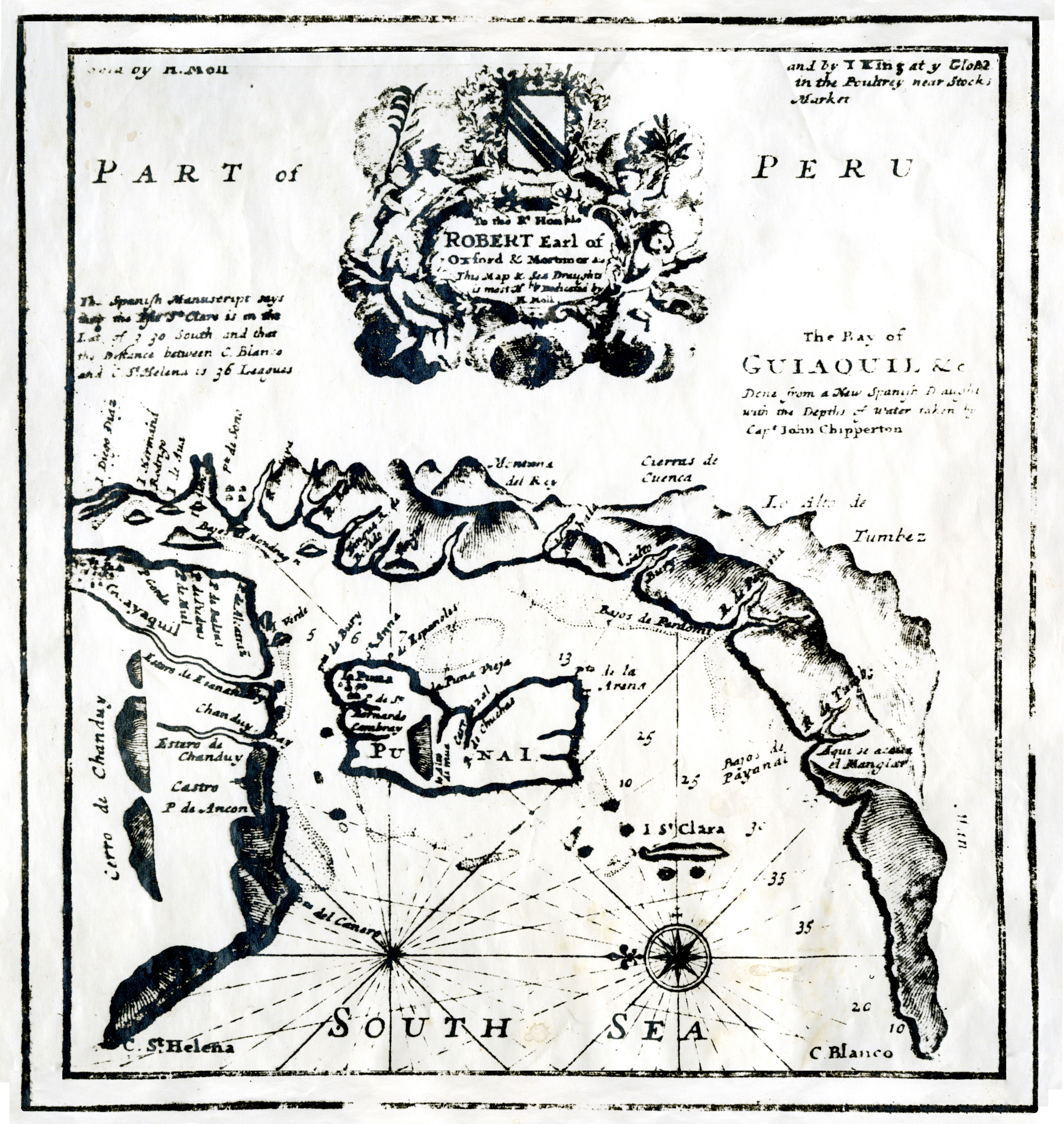
Bahia of Guayaquil on the Spanish Main, as seen by Clipperton

In 1703 he sailed with the expedition of Captain William Dampier during the War of the Spanish Succession. Dampier appointed Clipperton captain of one of the Spanish ships they had taken as a prize. This first voyage of Clipperton did not proceed well. He led a mutiny against Dampier, and was later taken captive by the Spanish. José Antonio de la Rocha y Carranza, the Marquis of Villa-Rocha, who would subsequently become governor of Panama, treated him with much indifference. Clipperton returned home in 1712 after four years of captivity.

It was, however, during this journey that he is said to have discovered Clipperton Island, which he would use as a hideout. He would later become captain of the Success as part of a different privateering syndicate, which he also held under his nominal command Captain George Shelvocke of the Speedwell. In his activities attacking Spanish targets on the west coast of the Americas, he used Clipperton Island as a base from which to stage his attacks and store loot and supplies, fortifying Clipperton Rock and expanding its cave network.

In 1714, Clipperton attacked the Manila Galleon while the crew was resting at Cabo San Lucas at the foot of the Baja California peninsula. This incident prompted King Philip V of Spain to call for the settlement of San Diego, California, presumably as a base from which to defend the western coast of New Spain.

== Later privateering expedition ==
Much more is known about Clipperton's second voyage to the Pacific Ocean in 1719. By that time he had become an able and diligent captain, but he was still unable to control his rash temper. In 1718 a group of London merchants, the "Gentleman Venturers", had financed a privateering expedition in expectation of the outbreak of the War of the Quadruple Alliance, with a commission to cruise against the Spanish in the South Sea. Clipperton in the Success sailed with the Speedwell, captained by George Shelvocke. Clipperton had replaced Shelvocke as overall commander of the expedition before the two ships left Plymouth in February 1719.

The ships lost contact with each other shortly after during a storm in the Bay of Biscay and did not meet up again until nearly two years later in the Pacific. On the voyage around Cape Horn, Clipperton dallied in the islands there hoping that Speedwell, which had been separated from Success in the storm, would catch up. When the Success departed the area, Clipperton left two men marooned as punishment on Juan Fernández, where Alexander Selkirk (who may have partly inspired the Robinson Crusoe story) had been marooned years before.

Clipperton sailed right around South America, raiding Spanish shipping about the coasts of Perú at the so-called "Southern Seas", where he was chased by Spanish admiral Blas de Lezo during the latter's first safety operations in the area. The privateer managed to escape Blas de Lezo and finally fled to Asian shores, where he was taken for dead. He captured his old enemy the Marquis de Villa-Rocha, whom he treated with much respect. Later, his travels carried him to Mexico.

On May 10, 1721, Clipperton arrived in the Mariana Islands after 53 days of sailing from Mexico, having lost six crew and the rest weak. He decided to seek provisions at Guam and anchored off Merizo. Clipperton and the Spanish governor of the Marianas, Luis Antonio Sánchez de Tagle, agreed to trade for provisions. Matters escalated when Clipperton proposed that the governor ransom the Marquis de Villa-Rocha, who was still aboard. The Marquis and two of the Success's crew went ashore, but Clipperton grew increasingly aggravated when the promised ransom and his crewmen were not returned. He sent a message ashore threatening to "demolish all the houses on shore, burn the ship in the harbour, and do all the mischief he could at the Philippine Islands" if his demands were not met, according to Shelvocke's journal. On May 28, the Spanish refused to trade for provisions unless Success continued trading its powder and shot. In response, Clipperton ordered to sail close to shore and start firing. However, Success grounded itself, becoming an easy target for Spanish cannon fire, killing the ship's first lieutenant. Shelvocke writes, "Clipperton, by now quite overcome with liquor, was unable to command. Another officer took over and after three days of false starts got the ship afloat after all the while under attack from the Spanish on shore." Clipperton finally managed to sail from Guam on May 31, 1721. Spain's Council of the Indies was already concerned about competing navies threatening the Manila galleon trade and Spain's possessions in the Pacific, and this incident appears to have finally convinced Spain that it needed to better protect its ships at Guam. In 1734, new anchorages were opened at Apra Harbor and two cannon batteries protecting approaches were constructed.

Clipperton then traveled to Macau, where he stayed as his health deteriorated. He then sailed to Batavia (now Jakarta) in the Dutch East Indies, finally returning to his family in Galway in Ireland in June 1722. He died a week after returning home.
