= Anatolia =

Peninsula of Turkey in Western Asia

Anatolia Asia Minor
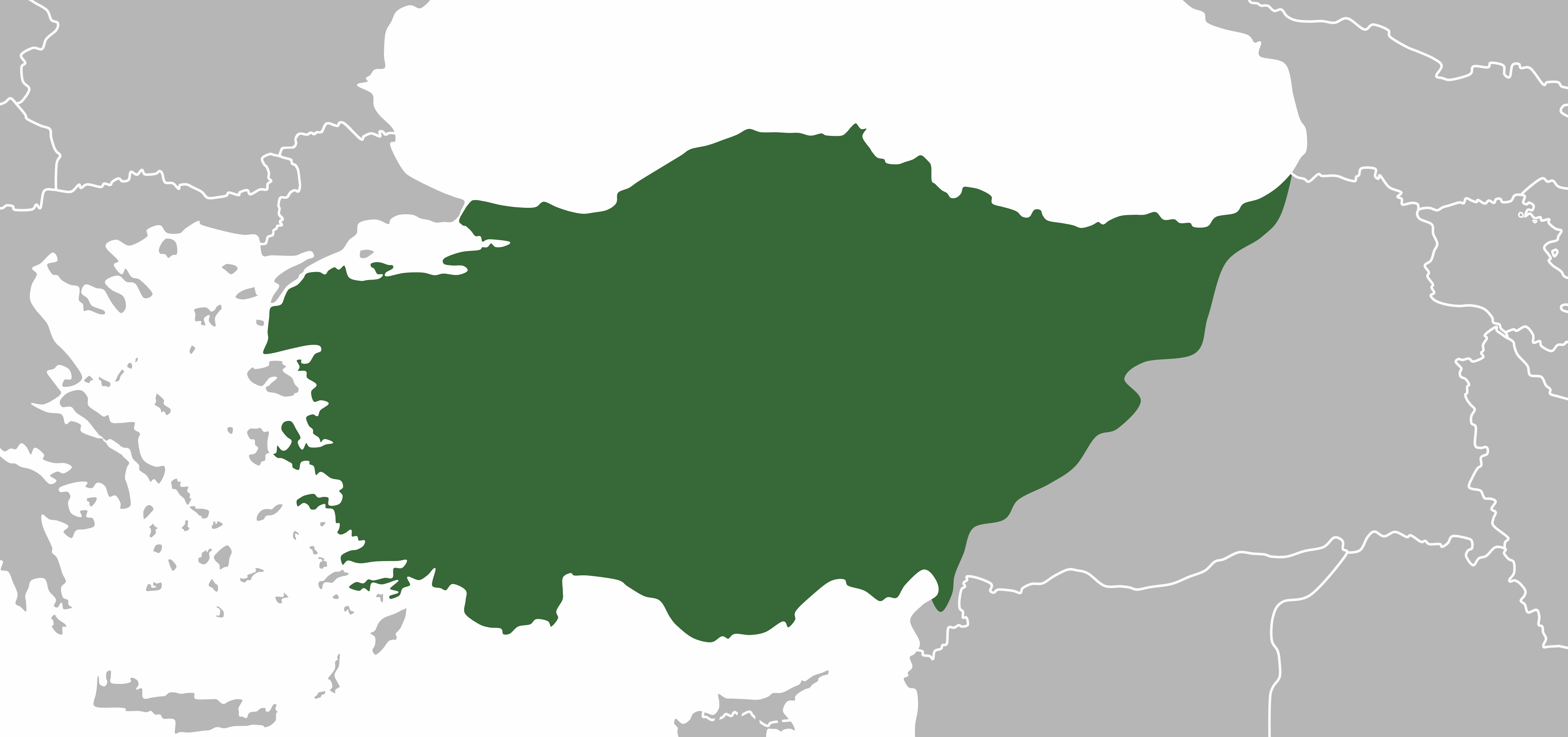
- Map of Anatolia (dark green), which according to one definition is delineated by an imprecise line from the Gulf of Alexandretta to the Black Sea. According to another definition, it is coterminous with the Asian part of Turkey.
- Etymology: 'The East' (from Greek: Ἀνατολή, Anatolḗ)

Geography
- Location: West Asia
- Coordinates: 39°N 35°E
- Type: Peninsula
- Area: 537,886 km^{2} (207,679 sq mi)

Administration
- Turkey
- Largest settlement: Ankara (pop. 5,803,482)

Demographics
- Demonym: Anatolian
- Languages: Predominantly Turkish; Others: Kurdish; Zaza; Arabic; Circassian; Laz; Greek; Georgian; Armenian; Neo-Aramaic; Other languages
- Ethnic groups: Majority: Turks; Minority: Kurds and other peoples

Additional information
- Time zone: TRT (UTC+03:00)

Anatolia (Greek: Ανατολή, Turkish: Anadolu), also known as Asia Minor, (Note: Additional alternative names include Asian/Asiatic Turkey, the Anatolian Peninsula, and the Anatolian Plateau.) is a peninsula in West Asia that makes up the majority of the land area of Turkey. It is the westernmost protrusion of Asia and is geographically bounded by four seas: the Mediterranean Sea to the south, the Aegean Sea to the west, the Propontis or Sea of Marmara to the northwest (with its two chokepoints: the Hellespont/Dardanelles toward the Mediterranean and the Bosporus toward the Black Sea), and the Black Sea to the north. The eastern and southeastern limits have been expanded either to the entirety of Asiatic Turkey or to an imprecise line from the Black Sea to the Gulf of Alexandretta. Topographically, the Sea of Marmara connects the Black Sea with the Aegean Sea through the Bosporus and the Dardanelles, and separates Anatolia from Thrace in Southeast Europe.

During the Neolithic period, Anatolia was an early center for the development of farming after it originated in the adjacent Fertile Crescent. Beginning around 9,000 years ago, there was a major migration of Anatolian Neolithic farmers into Europe, with their descendants coming to dominate the continent as far west as the Iberian Peninsula and the British Isles.

The earliest recorded inhabitants of Anatolia, such as the Hattians, who were neither Indo-European nor Semitic, were gradually absorbed by the incoming Indo-European Anatolian peoples, who spoke the now-extinct Anatolian languages. The major Anatolian languages included Hittite, Luwian, and Lydian; other local languages, albeit poorly attested, included Phrygian and Mysian. The Hurro-Urartian languages were spoken throughout Mitanni in the southeast, while Galatian, a Celtic language, was spoken throughout Galatia in the central peninsula. Among the other peoples who established a significant presence in ancient Anatolia were the Galatians, the Hurrians, the Assyrians, the Armenians, the Hattians, and the Cimmerians, as well as some of the ancient Greek tribes, including the Ionians, the Dorians, and the Aeolians. In the era of classical antiquity (see Classical Anatolia), the Anatolian languages were largely replaced by the Greek language, which came to dominate a large region during the Hellenistic period and the Roman period.

The Byzantine period saw the height and eventual decline of Greek influence throughout the peninsula as the Byzantine–Seljuk wars enabled the incoming Seljuk Turks to establish a foothold in the region. Thus, the process of Anatolia's Turkification began under the Seljuk Empire in the late 11th century and continued under the Ottoman Empire until the early 20th century, when the Ottoman dynasty collapsed in the aftermath of World War I. Between 1894 and 1924, millions of non-Turkic peoples and Christians, especially Greeks (about two million) and Armenians (est. 1.5 million), were killed by the Ottoman Turkish authorities or expelled from the bulk of the area of modern-day Turkey. Nonetheless, a variety of non-Turkic languages continue to be spoken by ethnic minorities in Anatolia today, including Arabic, Kurdish, Neo-Aramaic, Armenian, the North Caucasian languages, Laz, Georgian, and Greek.

== Geography ==
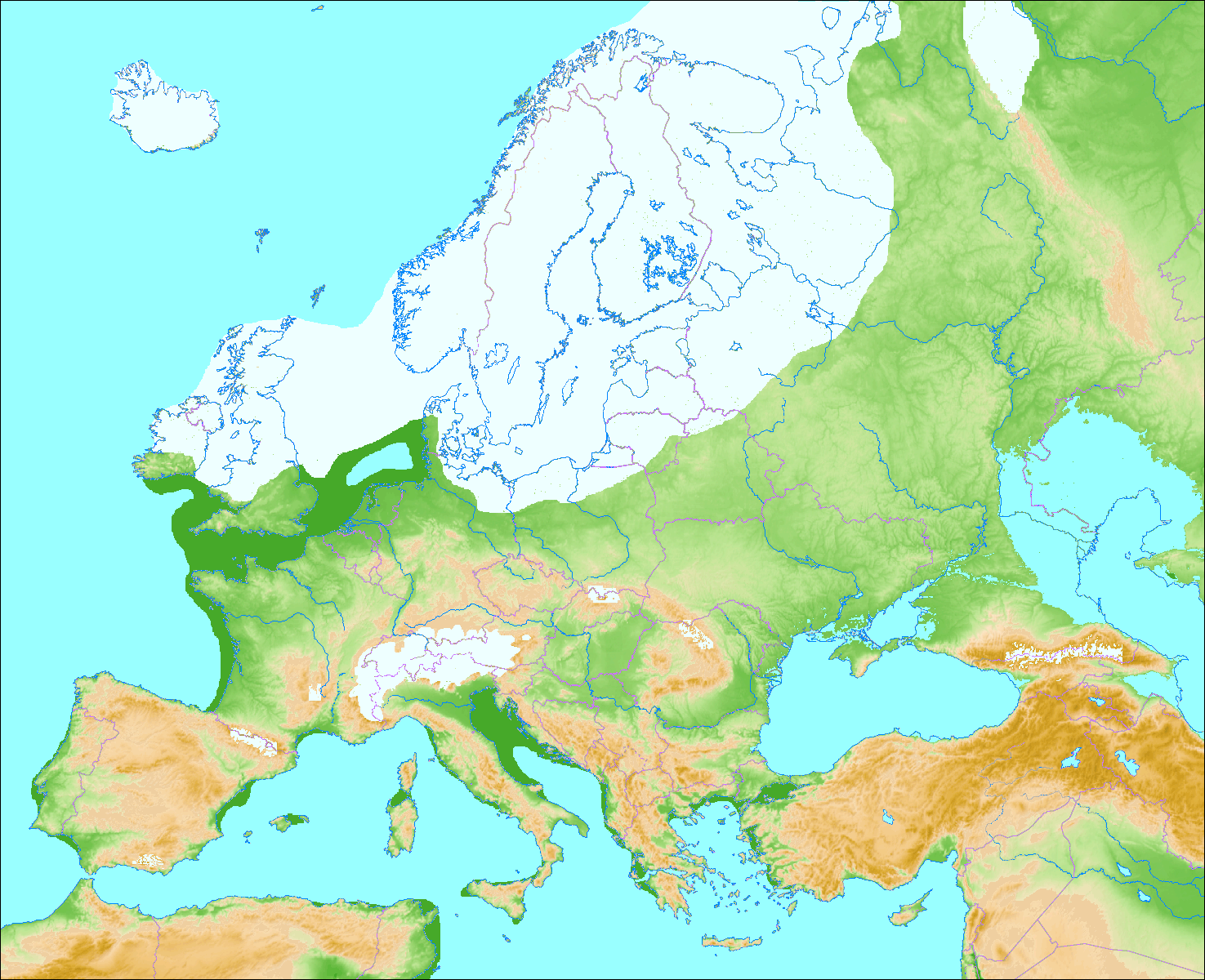
Europe during the Last Glacial Maximum, c. 20,000 years ago. Anatolia was connected to the European mainland until c. 5,600 BCE, when the melting ice sheets caused the sea level in the Mediterranean to rise around 120 m (390 ft), triggering the formation of the Turkish Straits. As a result, two former lakes (the Sea of Marmara and the Black Sea) were connected to the Mediterranean Sea, which separated Anatolia from Europe.

Traditionally, Anatolia is considered to extend in the east to an indefinite line running from the Gulf of Alexandretta to the Black Sea, coterminous with the Anatolian Plateau. This traditional geographical definition is used, for example, in the latest edition of Merriam-Webster's Geographical Dictionary. Under this definition, Anatolia is bounded to the east by the Armenian Highlands, and the Euphrates before that river bends to the southeast to enter Mesopotamia. To the southeast, it is bounded by the ranges that separate it from the Orontes valley in Syria and the Mesopotamian plain.

Following the Armenian genocide, Western Armenia was renamed the Eastern Anatolia region by the newly established Turkish government. In 1941, with the First Geography Congress which divided Turkey into seven geographical regions based on differences in climate and landscape, the eastern provinces of Turkey were placed into the Eastern Anatolia region, which largely corresponds to the historical region of Western Armenia. Vazken Davidian terms the expanded use of "Anatolia" to apply to territory in eastern Turkey that was formerly referred to as Armenia (which had a sizeable Armenian population before the Armenian genocide) an "ahistorical imposition" and notes that a growing body of literature is uncomfortable with referring to the Ottoman East as "Eastern Anatolia".

The highest mountain in the Eastern Anatolia region (also the highest peak in the Armenian Highlands) is Mount Ararat (5123 m). The Euphrates, Aras, Karasu and Murat rivers connect the Armenian Highlands to the South Caucasus and the Upper Euphrates Valley. Along with the Çoruh, these rivers are the longest in the Eastern Anatolia region.

== Etymology ==
The English-language name Anatolia derives from the Greek Ἀνατολή (Anatolḗ) meaning "the East" and designating (from a Greek point of view) eastern regions in general. The Greek word refers to the direction where the sun rises, coming from ἀνατέλλω anatello '(Ι) rise up', comparable to terms in other languages such as "levant" from Latin levo 'to rise', "orient" from Latin orior 'to arise, to originate', Hebrew מִזְרָח mizraḥ 'east' from זָרַח zaraḥ 'to rise, to shine', Aramaic מִדְנָח midnaḥ from דְּנַח denaḥ 'to rise, to shine'. The Latinised form "Anatolia", with its -ia ending, is probably a Medieval Latin innovation. The modern Turkish form Anadolu derives directly from the Greek name Ἀνατολή (Anatolḗ). The Russian male name Anatoly, the French Anatole and plain Anatol, all stemming from saints Anatolius of Laodicea (d. 283) and Anatolius of Constantinople (d. 458; the first Patriarch of Constantinople), share the same linguistic origin.

The use of Anatolian designations has varied over time, perhaps originally referring to the Aeolian, Ionian and Dorian colonies situated along the eastern coasts of the Aegean Sea, but also encompassing eastern regions in general. Such use of Anatolian designations was employed during the reign of Roman Emperor Diocletian (r. 284–305), who created the Diocese of the East (or the "Eastern Diocese"), but completely unrelated to the regions of Asia Minor. In their widest territorial scope, Anatolian designations were employed during the reign of Emperor Constantine I (306–337), who created the Praetorian prefecture of the East, known in Greek as the Eastern Prefecture, encompassing all eastern regions of the Late Roman Empire and spanning from Thrace to Egypt.

Only after the loss of other eastern regions during the 7th century and the reduction of Byzantine eastern domains to Asia Minor, that region became the only remaining part of the Byzantine East, and thus commonly referred to (in Greek) as the Eastern part of the Empire. At the same time, the Anatolic Theme (Ἀνατολικὸν θέμα / "the Eastern theme") was created, as a province (theme) covering the western and central parts of Turkey's present-day Central Anatolia Region, centered around Iconium, but ruled from the city of Amorium.

== Names ==
The oldest known name for any region within Anatolia is related to its central area, known as the "Land of Hatti"—a designation that was initially used for the land of ancient Hattians, but later became the most common name for the entire territory under the rule of ancient Hittites.

The first recorded name the Greeks used for the Anatolian peninsula, though not particularly popular at the time, was Ἀσία (Asía), perhaps from an Akkadian expression for the "sunrise" or possibly echoing the name of the Assuwa league in western Anatolia. The Romans used it as the name of their province, comprising the west of the peninsula plus the nearby Aegean Islands. As the name "Asia" broadened its scope to apply to the vaster region east of the Mediterranean, some Greeks in Late Antiquity came to use the name Asia Minor (Μικρὰ Ἀσία, Mikrà Asía), meaning "Lesser Asia" to refer to present-day Anatolia, whereas the administration of the Empire preferred the description Ἀνατολή (Anatolḗ; lit. 'the East').

The endonym Ῥωμανία (Rōmanía "the land of the Romans, i.e. the Eastern Roman Empire") was understood as another name for the province by the invading Seljuq Turks, who founded a Sultanate of Rûm in 1077. Thus (land of the) Rûm became another name for Anatolia. By the 12th century Europeans had started referring to Anatolia as Turchia.

During the era of the Ottoman Empire, many mapmakers referred to the mountainous plateau in eastern Anatolia as Armenia. Other contemporary sources called the same area Kurdistan. Geographers have used East Anatolian plateau, Armenian plateau and the Iranian plateau to refer to the region; the former two largely overlap. While a standard definition of Anatolia refers to the entire Asian side of Turkey, according to archaeologist Lori Khatchadourian, this difference in terminology "primarily result[s] from the shifting political fortunes and cultural trajectories of the region since the nineteenth century".

Turkey's First Geography Congress in 1941 created two geographical regions of Turkey to the east of the Gulf of Iskenderun-Black Sea line, the Eastern Anatolia region and the Southeastern Anatolia region, the former largely corresponding to the western part of the Armenian Highlands, the latter to the northern part of the Mesopotamian plain. According to Richard Hovannisian, this changing of toponyms was "necessary to obscure all evidence" of the Armenian presence as part of the policy of Armenian genocide denial embarked upon by the newly established Turkish government and what Hovannisian calls its "foreign collaborators".

== History ==
=== Prehistoric Anatolia ===
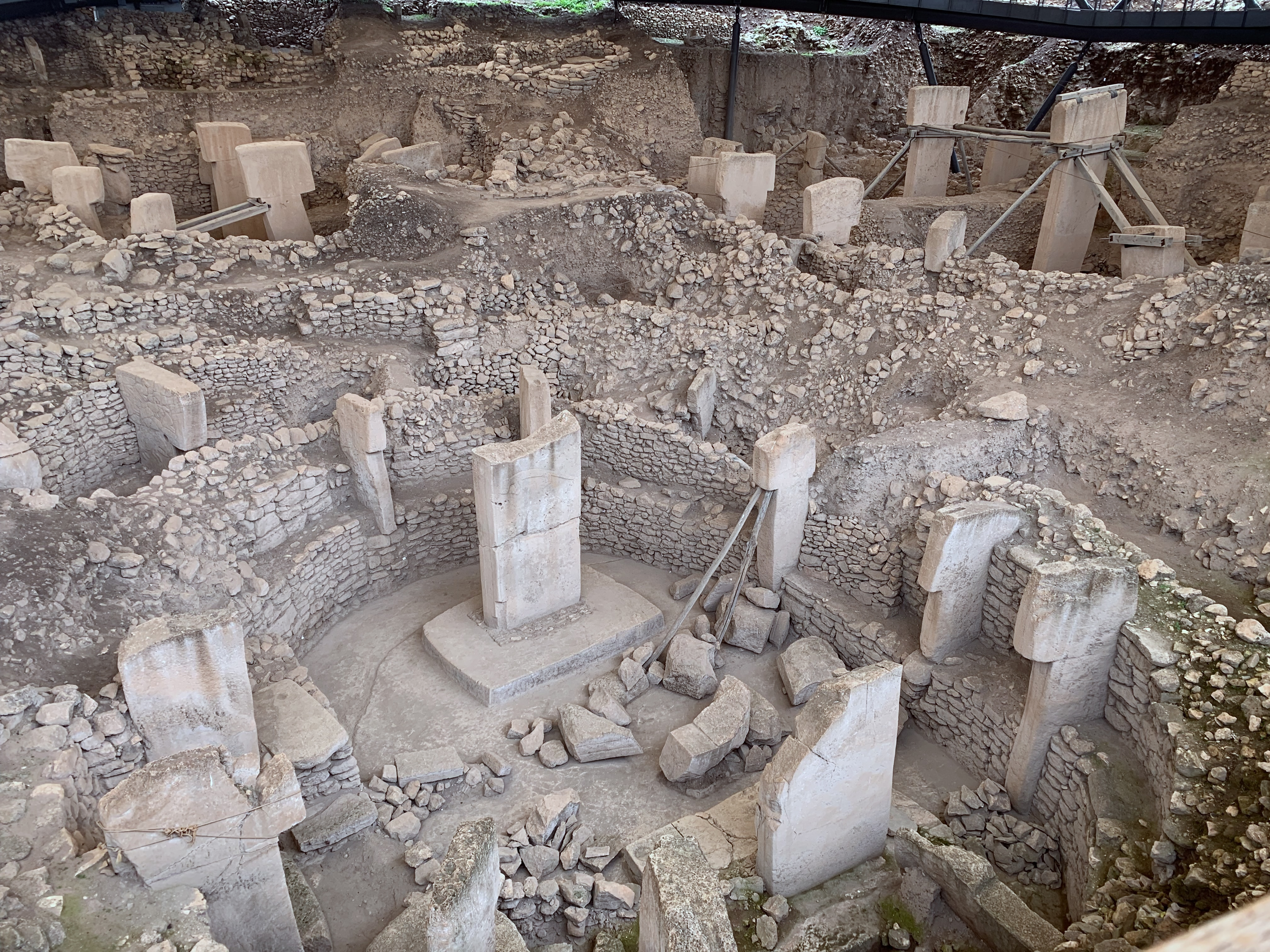
The henges in Göbekli Tepe were erected as far back as 9,600 BCE.

Human habitation in Anatolia dates back to the Paleolithic. Neolithic settlements include Çatalhöyük, Çayönü, Nevali Cori, Aşıklı Höyük, Boncuklu Höyük, Hacilar, Göbekli Tepe, Norşuntepe, Köşk Höyük, and Yumuktepe. Çatalhöyük (7,000 BCE) is considered the most advanced of these. Recent advances in archaeogenetics have confirmed that the spread of agriculture from the Middle East to Europe was strongly correlated with the migration of early farmers from Anatolia about 9,000 years ago, and was not just a cultural exchange. Anatolian Neolithic farmers derived most of their ancestry from local Anatolian hunter-gatherers, suggesting that agriculture was adopted in site by these hunter-gatherers and not spread by demic diffusion into the region. Anatolian-derived Neolithic Farmers would subsequently spread across Europe, as far west as the Iberian Peninsula and the British Isles, as well as to the Maghreb. Most modern Europeans derive a significant part of their ancestry from these Neolithic Anatolian farmers. Levantines also have significant Neolithic Anatolian farmer ancestry from post-Bronze Age migrations. About 6,500 years ago and thereafter, Anatolians became more genetically homogeneous due to eastern inflow. Earlier forms of Anatolian and non–Indo-European languages such as Hattic and Hurrian were likely spoken by migrants and locals participating in this great mixture. Steppe ancestry is also absent in Anatolians until the Bronze Age.

Neolithic Anatolia has been proposed as the homeland of the Indo-European language family, although linguists tend to favour a later origin in the steppes north of the Black Sea. However, it is clear that the Anatolian languages, the earliest attested branch of Indo-European, have been spoken in Anatolia since at least the 19th century BCE.

=== Ancient Anatolia ===
Anatolia's historical records start with clay tablets from approximately around 2000 BC that were found in modern-day Kültepe. These tablets belonged to an Assyrian trade colony. The languages in Anatolia at that time included Hattian, Hurrian, Hittite, Luwian, and Palaic.

==== Hattians and Hurrians ====
The earliest historically attested populations of Anatolia were the Hattians in central Anatolia, and Hurrians further to the east. The Hattians were an indigenous people, whose main centre was the city of Hattush. Affiliation of Hattian language remains unclear, while Hurrian language belongs to a distinctive family of Hurro-Urartian languages. All of those languages are extinct; relationships with indigenous languages of the Caucasus have been proposed, but are not generally accepted. The region became famous for exporting raw materials. Organized trade between Anatolia and Mesopotamia started to emerge during the period of the Akkadian Empire, and was continued and intensified during the period of the Old Assyrian Empire, between the 21st and the 18th centuries BCE. Assyrian traders were bringing tin and textiles in exchange for copper, silver or gold. Cuneiform records, dated c. 20th century BCE, found in Anatolia at the Assyrian colony of Kanesh, use an advanced system of trading computations and credit lines.

==== Hittites, Luwians, and Palaians ====
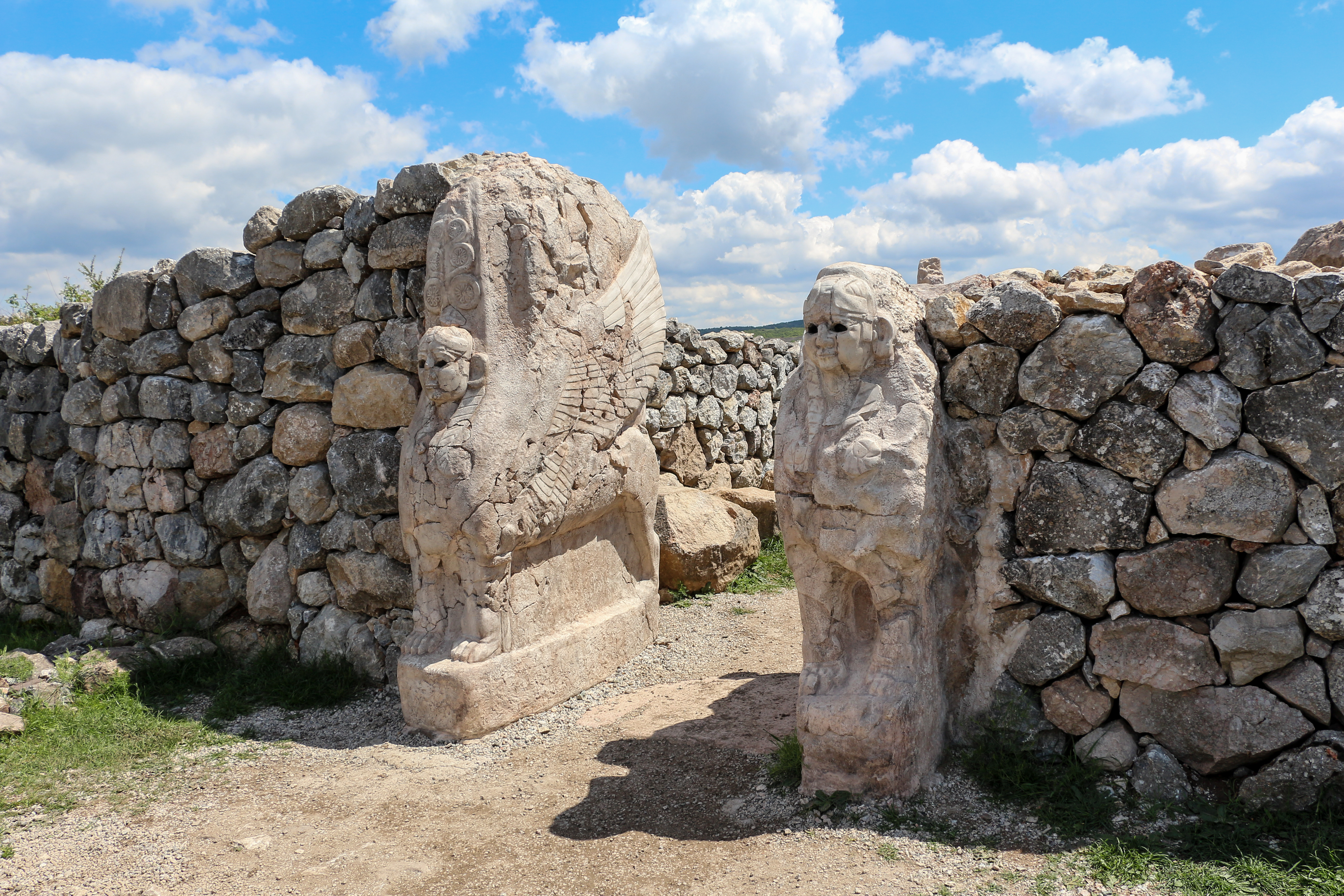
The Sphinx Gate in Hattusa

Hattian rulers were gradually replaced by Hittite rulers. The Hittite kingdom was a large kingdom in Central Anatolia, with its capital of Hattusa. It co-existed in Anatolia with Palaians and Luwians, approximately between 1700 and 1200 BC. As the Hittite kingdom was disintegrating, further waves of Indo-European peoples migrated from southeastern Europe, which was followed by warfare. It is not known if the Trojan War is based on historical events. Troy's Late Bronze Age layers matches most with Iliad's story.

==== Post-Hittite Anatolia (12th–6th centuries BCE) ====
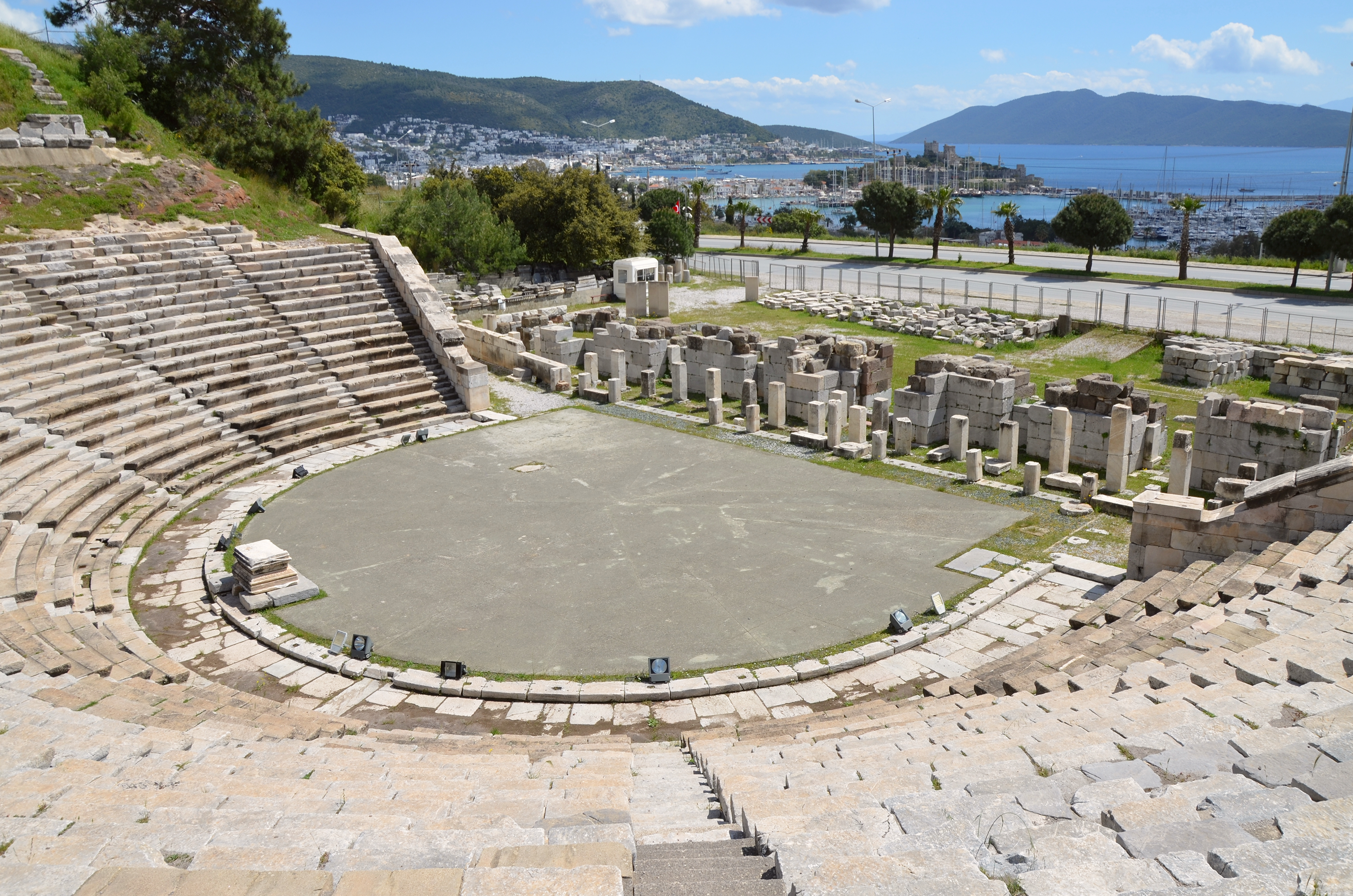
The Theatre at Halicarnassus (modern Bodrum) was built in the 4th century BCE by Mausolus, the Persian satrap (governor) of Caria. The Mausoleum at Halicarnassus was one of the Seven Wonders of the Ancient World.

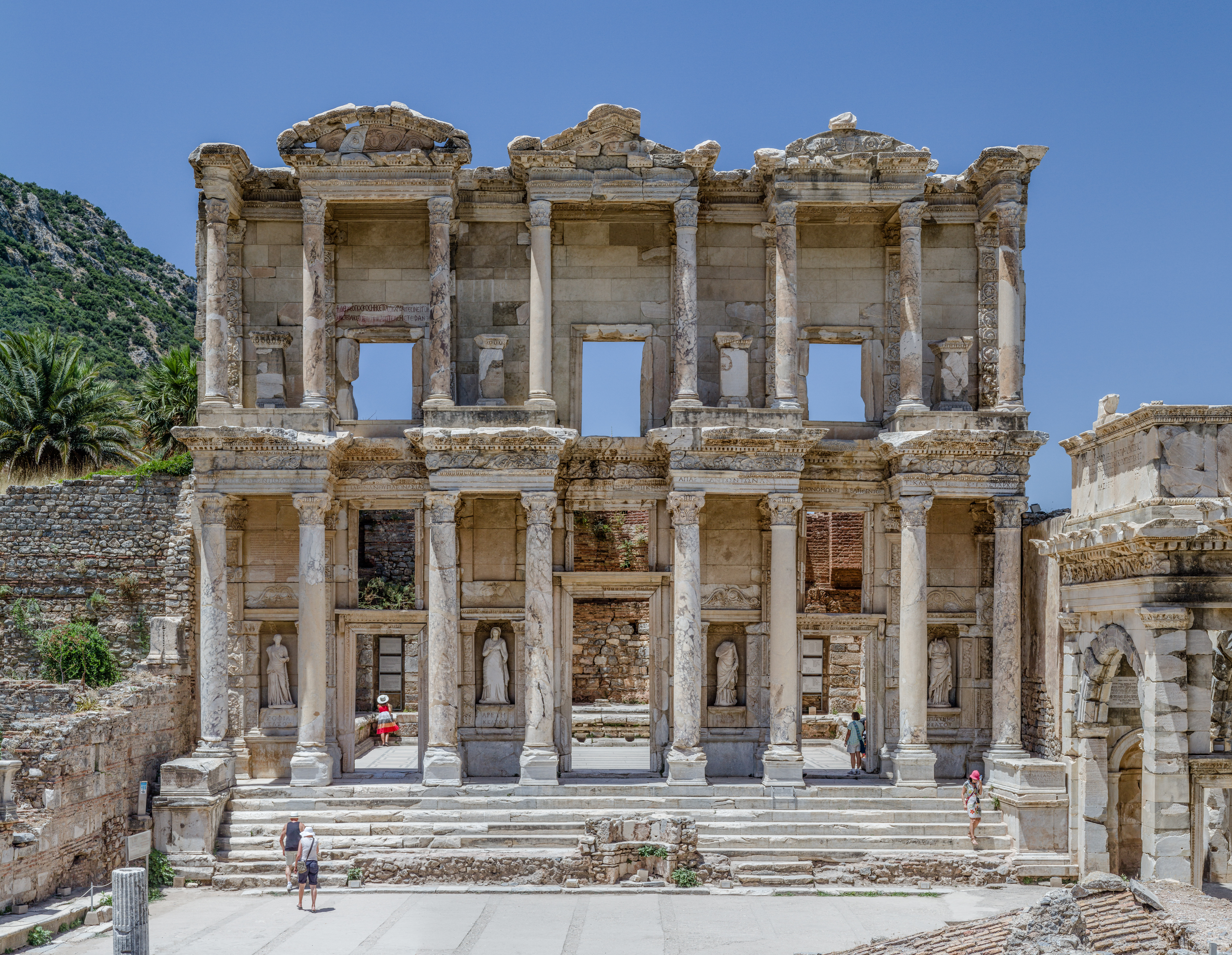
The Library of Celsus in Ephesus was built by the Romans in 114–117. The Temple of Artemis in Ephesus, built by king Croesus of Lydia in the 6th century BC, was one of the Seven Wonders of the Ancient World.

Around 750 BC, Phrygia had been established, with its two centres in Gordium and modern-day Kayseri. Phrygians spoke an Indo-European language, which was closer to Greek than Anatolian languages. Phrygians shared Anatolia with Neo-Hittites and Urartu. Luwian-speakers were probably the majority in various Anatolian Neo-Hittite states. Urartians spoke a non-Indo-European language and their capital was around Lake Van. Urartu and Phrygia fell in seventh century BC. They were replaced by Carians, Lycians and Lydians. These three cultures "can be considered a reassertion of the ancient, indigenous culture of the Hattian cities of Anatolia".

==== Early Greek presence ====
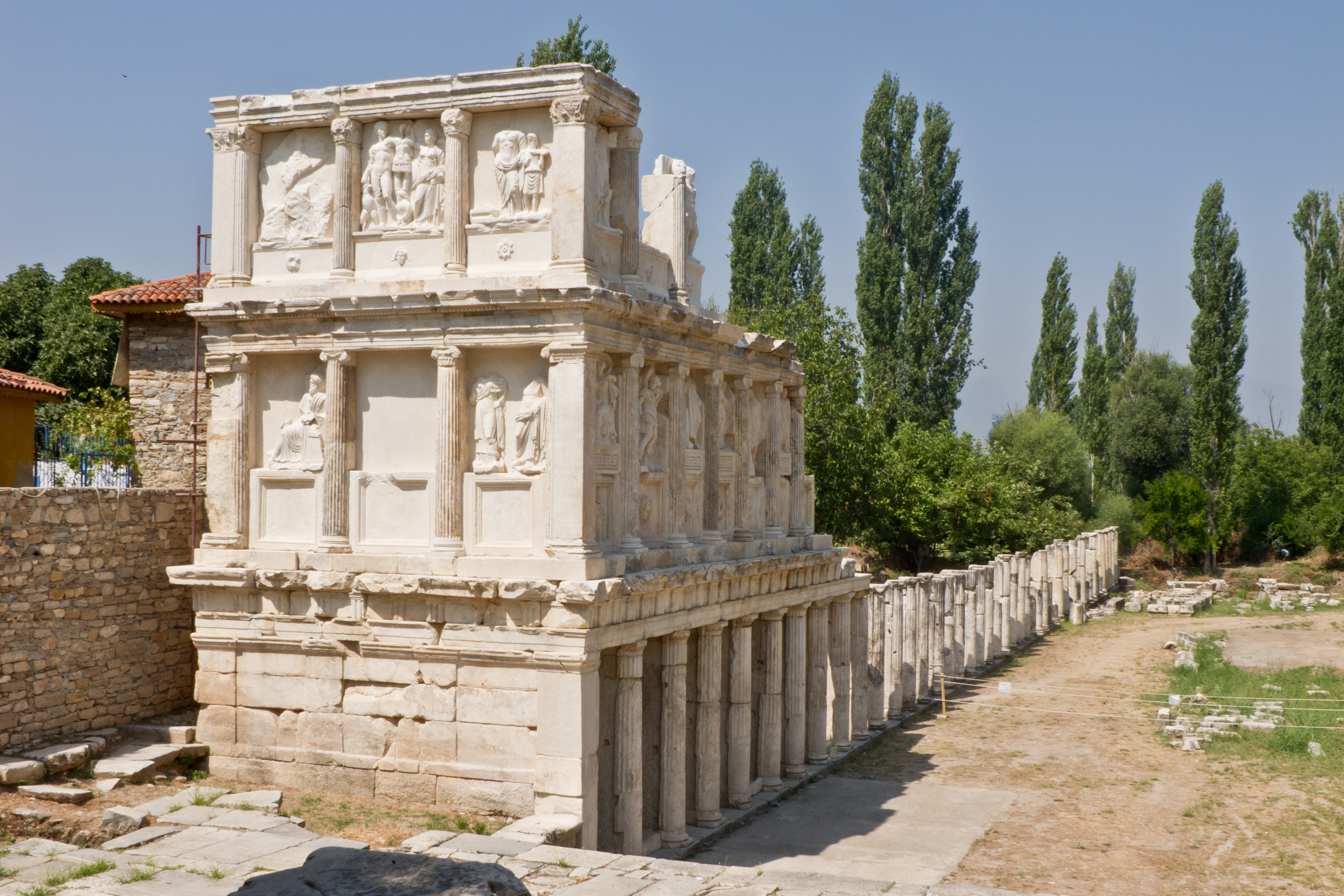
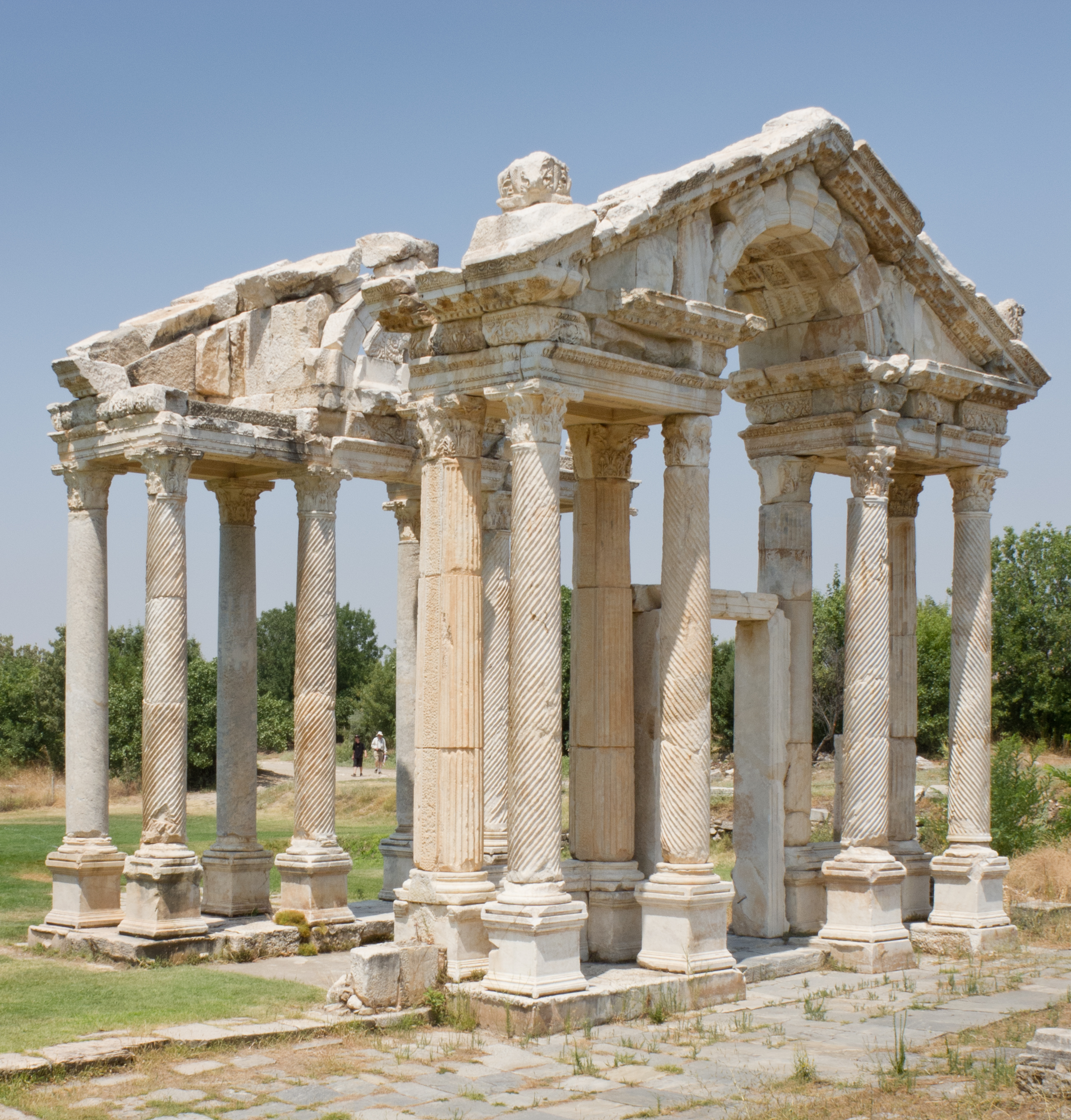
The Sebasteion (left) and Tetrapylon (right) in Aphrodisias of Caria, which was inscribed on the UNESCO World Heritage Site List in 2017

In the late Bronze Age, there were three or four Greek-speaking settlements in Anatolia, including Miletus. Around 1200–1000 BC, Greeks started migrating to the west coast of Anatolia. The size of these migrations are unknown. Important cities included Miletus, Ephesus, Halicarnassus, Smyrna (now İzmir) and others These settlements were grouped as Aeolis, Ionia, and Doris, after the specific Greek groups that settled them. By 900 BC, Greek settlements emerged across the west coast of Anatolia from Knidos in the south all the way to the entrance of the Hellespont/Dardanelles in the north. In the Anatolian interior, Greek culture had limited influence until the time of Alexander the Great; Greek settlements "largely (although not exclusively)" existed on the western coast of Anatolia in the early Iron Age.

Further Greek colonization in Anatolia was led by Miletus and Megara in 750–480 BC, particularly in the Sea of Marmara and the Black Sea; settlements were also established in the south coast of Anatolia, at Phaselis, Aspendos, and Side. Some archaeological evidence supports ancient Greeks' migration myths about the Ionian Migration not being a "virgin soil foundation", with a pre-Greek population present. Aeolian and Ionian Greeks, refugees from their former Mycenaean kingdoms, mixed through marriages with native Anatolians. In the late eighth century BC, the Greek cities of Anatolia maintained familial, linguistic, and religious connections to their close relatives on the Greek mainland. Around 750 BC, Greeks in Anatolia started to differentiate themselves from other Anatolians, whom they regarded as barbarians, through the concept of the polis. The Greek city-states emerged in Anatolian western coasts as significant cultural and commercial hubs. Their prosperity was based on extensive trade with the Anatolian peoples (Lycian, Lydian, Carian) and with other cities around the Aegean Sea. They also made numerous achievements in philosophy, science, architecture, and literature.

=== Classical Anatolia ===
In Classical antiquity, Anatolia was described by the Ancient Greek historian Herodotus and later historians as divided into regions that were diverse in culture, language, and religious practices. The northern regions included Bithynia, Paphlagonia, and Pontus; to the west were Mysia, Lydia, and Caria; and Lycia, Pamphylia, and Cilicia belonged to the southern shore. There were also several inland regions: Phrygia, Cappadocia, Pisidia, and Galatia. Languages spoken included the late surviving Anatolic languages, Isaurian, and Pisidian, Greek in western and coastal regions, Phrygian spoken until the 7th century CE, local variants of Thracian in the northwest, the Galatian variant of Gaulish in Galatia until the 6th century CE, Cappadocian in the homonymous region, Armenian in the east, and Kartvelian languages in the northeast.

Anatolia is known as the birthplace of minted coinage (as opposed to unminted coinage, which first appears in Mesopotamia at a much earlier date) as a medium of exchange, sometime in the 7th century BCE in Lydia. The use of minted coins continued to flourish during the Greek and Roman eras.

During the 6th century BCE, all of Anatolia was conquered by the Persian Achaemenid Empire, the Persians having usurped the Medes as the dominant dynasty of Persia. In 499 BCE, the Ionian city-states on the west coast of Anatolia rebelled against Persian rule. The Ionian Revolt, as it became known, though quelled, initiated the Greco-Persian Wars, which ended in a Greek victory in 449 BCE, and the Ionian cities regained their independence. By the Peace of Antalcidas (387 BCE), which ended the Corinthian War, Persia regained control over Ionia.

==== Hellenistic period ====
In 334 BCE, the Macedonian Greek king Alexander the Great conquered the Anatolian peninsula from the Achaemenid Persian Empire. Alexander restored democracy in the Greek cities of Anatolia and was greeted by them as a liberator. The Lydians and Carians also hailed Alexander. Alexander's conquest opened up the interior of Asia Minor to Greek settlement and influence. Anatolian cities transformed themselves into Hellenic-style poleis, and cities in Caria, Lydia, Lycia and Cilicia adopted Greek language, culture and institutions.

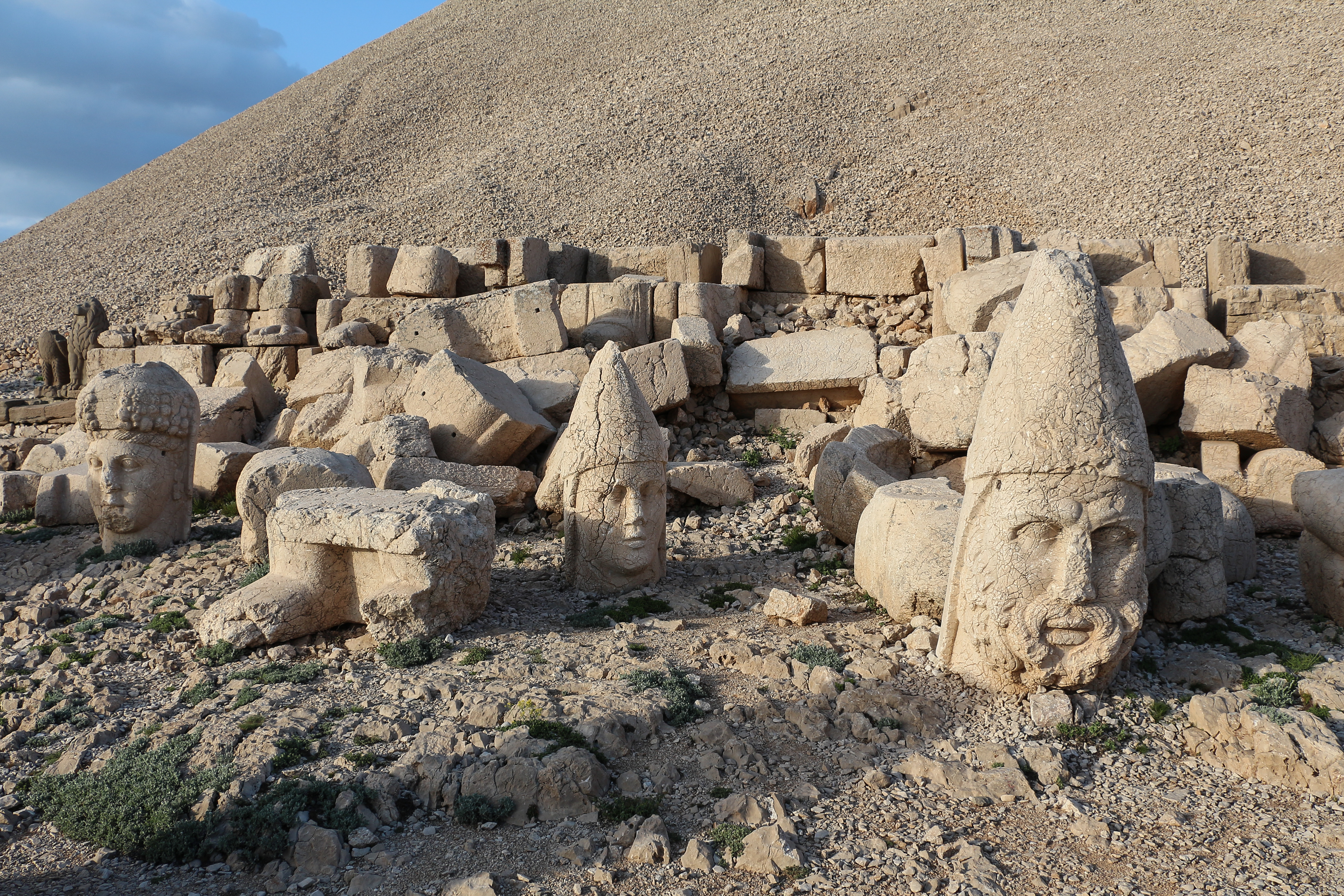
Sanctuary of the Kings of Commagene on Mount Nemrut (1st century BCE)

Following the death of Alexander the Great and the subsequent breakup of the Macedonian Empire, Anatolia was ruled by a series of Hellenistic kingdoms, such as the Attalids of Pergamum and the Seleucids, the latter controlling most of Anatolia. A period of peaceful Hellenization followed, such that the local Anatolian languages had been supplanted by Greek by the 1st century BCE. In 133 BCE, the last Attalid king bequeathed his kingdom to the Roman Republic; western and central Anatolia came under Roman control, but Hellenistic culture remained predominant.

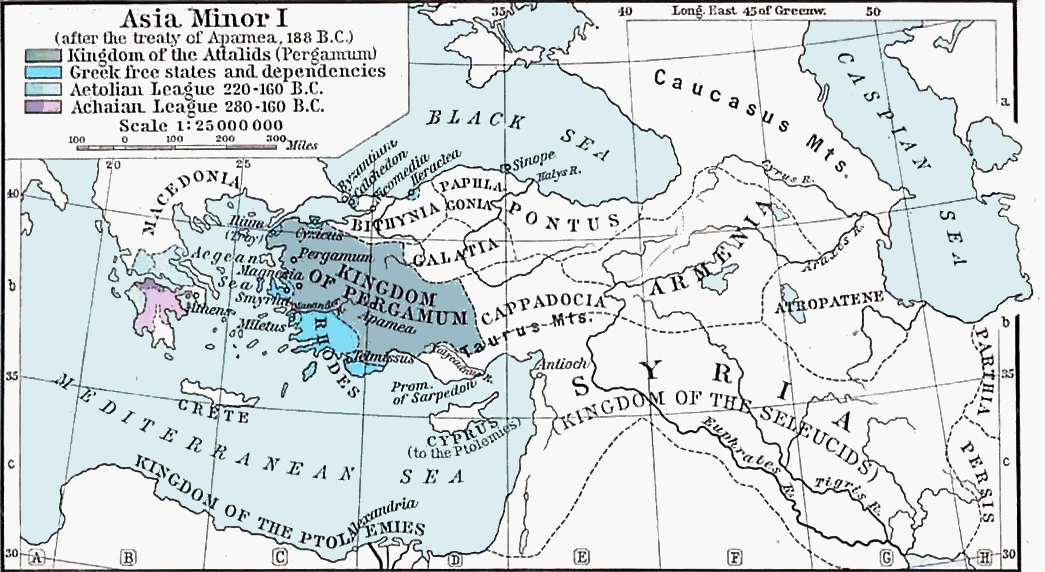
Asia Minor in 188 BC

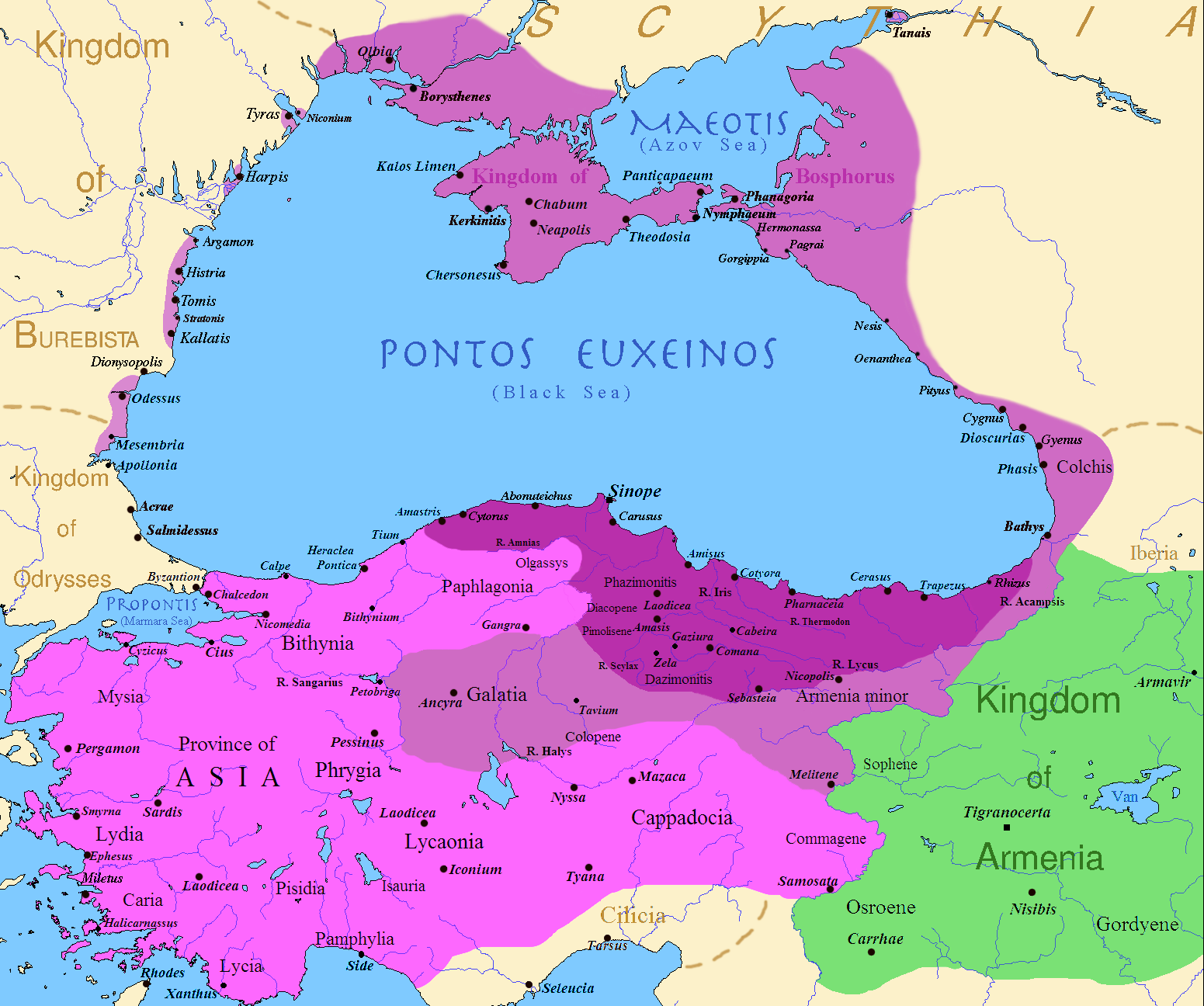
Kingdom of Pontus before the reign of Mithridates VI (120 BC, Dark Purple), after his early conquests (Light Purple), and his conquests in the First Mithridatic War (88 BC, Pink). Armenia is in Green

Mithridates VI Eupator, ruler of the Kingdom of Pontus in northern Anatolia, waged war against the Roman Republic in the year 88 BCE in order to halt the advance of Roman hegemony in the Aegean Sea region. Mithridates VI sought to dominate Asia Minor and the Black Sea region, waging several hard-fought but ultimately unsuccessful wars (the Mithridatic Wars) to break Roman dominion over Asia and the Hellenic world. He has been called the greatest ruler of the Kingdom of Pontus. His ally and son-in-law, Tigranes the Great of Armenia (r. 95 – 55 BCE), briefly conquered significant portions of Anatolia, including Cilicia, Cappadocia, Sophene and perhaps Galatia. Further annexations by Rome, in particular of the Kingdom of Pontus by Pompey, brought all of Anatolia under Roman control, except for the southeastern frontier with the Parthian Empire, which remained unstable for centuries, causing a series of military conflicts that culminated in the Roman–Parthian Wars (54 BCE – 217 CE).

=== Early Christian period ===
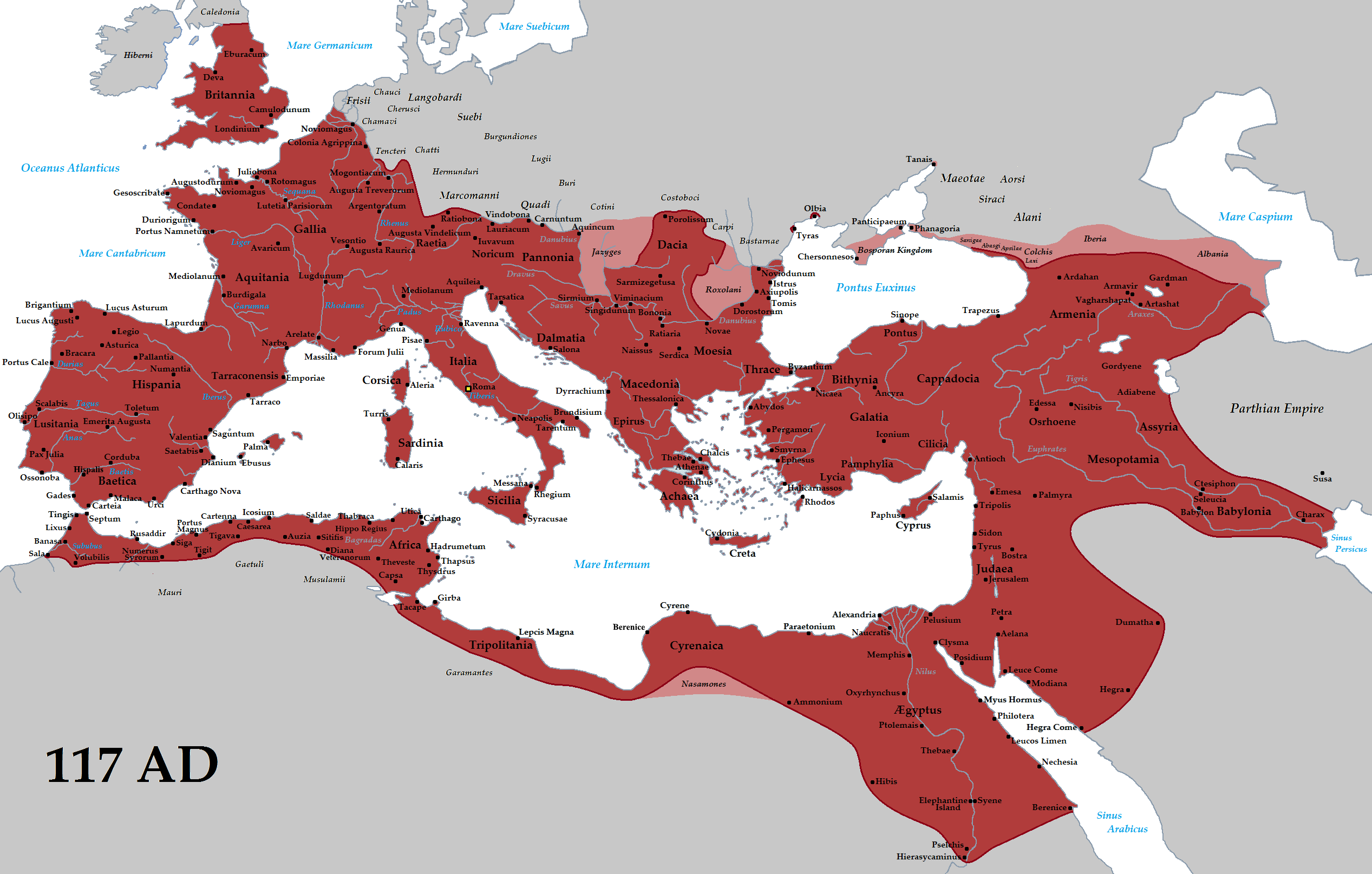
Roman Empire in 117 CE at its greatest extent, at the time of Trajan's death Vassal states

The Seven churches of Asia

After the first division of the Roman Empire, Anatolia became part of the Eastern Roman Empire, otherwise known as the Byzantine Empire or Byzantium. In the 1st century CE, Anatolia became one of the first places where Christianity spread, so that by the 4th century CE, western and central Anatolia were overwhelmingly Christian and Greek-speaking.

Byzantine Anatolia was one of the wealthiest and most densely populated places in the Later Roman Empire. Anatolia's wealth grew during the 4th and 5th centuries thanks, in part, to the Pilgrim's Road that ran through the peninsula. Literary evidence about the rural landscape stems from the Christian hagiographies of the 6th-century Nicholas of Sion and 7th-century Theodore of Sykeon. Large and prosperous urban centres of Byzantine Anatolia included Assos, Ephesus, Miletus, Nicaea, Pergamum, Priene, Sardis, and Aphrodisias.

From the mid-5th century onwards, urbanism was affected negatively and began to decline, while the rural areas reached unprecedented levels of prosperity in the region. Historians and scholars continue to debate the cause of the urban decline in Byzantine Anatolia between the 6th and 7th centuries, variously attributing it to the Plague of Justinian (541), the Byzantine–Sasanian War (602–628), and the Arab invasion of the Levant (634–638).

=== Medieval period ===
Byzantine Anatolia and the Byzantine-Arab frontier zone in the mid-9th century

In the 10 years following the Battle of Manzikert in 1071, the Seljuk Turks from Central Asia migrated over large areas of Anatolia, with particular concentrations around the northwestern rim. The Turkish language and the Islamic religion were gradually introduced as a result of the Seljuk conquest, and this period marks the start of Anatolia's slow transition from predominantly Christian and Greek-speaking, to predominantly Muslim and Turkish-speaking (although ethnic groups such as Armenians, Greeks, and Assyrians remained numerous and retained Christianity and their native languages). In the following century, the Byzantines managed to reassert their control in western and northern Anatolia. Control of Anatolia was then split between the Byzantine Empire and the Seljuk Sultanate of Rûm, with the Byzantine holdings gradually being reduced.

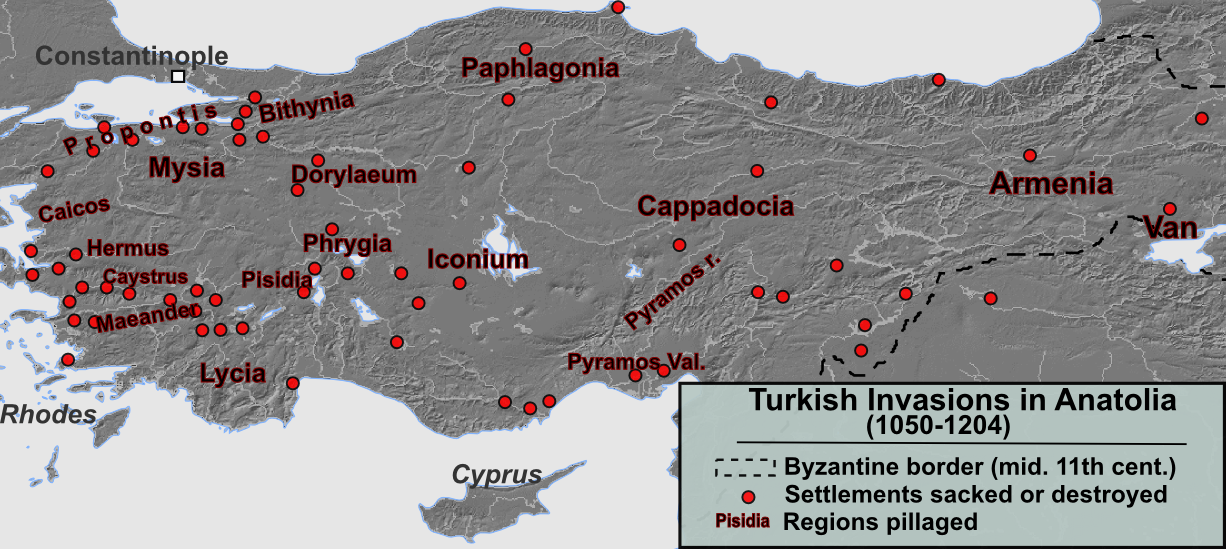
Settlements and regions affected during the first wave of Turkish invasions in Asia Minor (11th–13th century)

The Fourth Crusade would prove to be a grave challenge to the Byzantine Empire. The loss of a central authority figure shattered the empire, breaking it into four major successor states that each held sway over different parts of the empire. Two of these states, the Empire of Nicaea and the Empire of Trebizond, would contend for the remains of the empire in Anatolia, with the Nicaean Empire holding the northwestern coast and the Trapezuntine empire holding the northeastern coast.

In 1255, the Mongols swept through eastern and central Anatolia, and would remain until 1335. The Ilkhanate garrison was stationed near Ankara. After the decline of the Ilkhanate from 1335 to 1353, the Mongol Empire's legacy in the region was the Uyghur Eretna Dynasty that was overthrown by Kadi Burhan al-Din in 1381.

By the end of the 14th century, most of Anatolia was controlled by various Anatolian beyliks. Smyrna fell in 1330, and the last Byzantine stronghold in Anatolia, Philadelphia, fell in 1390. The Turkmen Beyliks were under the control of the Mongols, at least nominally, through declining Seljuk Sultans. The Beyliks did not mint coins in the names of their own leaders while they remained under the suzerainty of the Mongol Ilkhanids. The Ottoman ruler Osman I was the first Turkish ruler who minted coins in his own name in 1320s; they bear the legend "Minted by Osman son of Ertugrul". Since the minting of coins was a prerogative accorded in Islamic practice only to a sovereign, it can be considered that the Ottoman Turks had become formally independent from the Mongol Khans.

=== Ottoman Empire ===
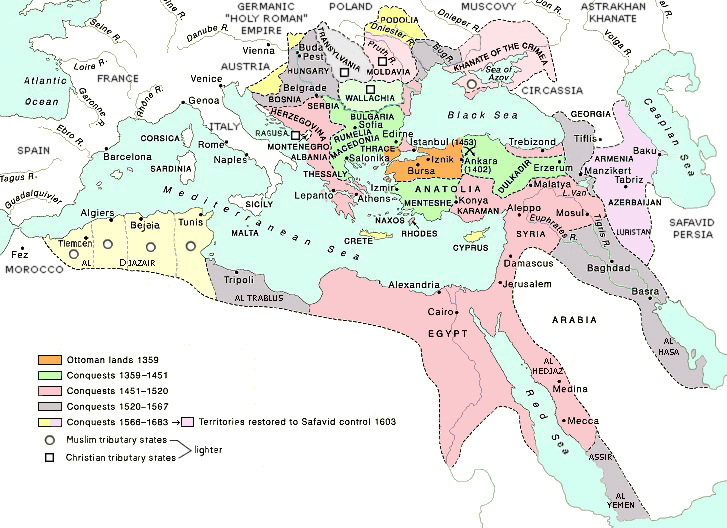
Territorial evolution of the Ottoman Empire between 1359 and 1683

Among the Turkish leaders, the Ottomans emerged as great power under Osman I and his son Orhan. The Anatolian beyliks were successively absorbed into the rising Ottoman Empire during the 15th century. It is not well understood how the Osmanlı ('Ottoman Turks'), came to dominate their neighbours, as the history of medieval Anatolia is still little known. The Ottomans completed the conquest of the peninsula in 1517 with the taking of Halicarnassus (modern Bodrum) from the Knights of Saint John.

=== Modern times ===
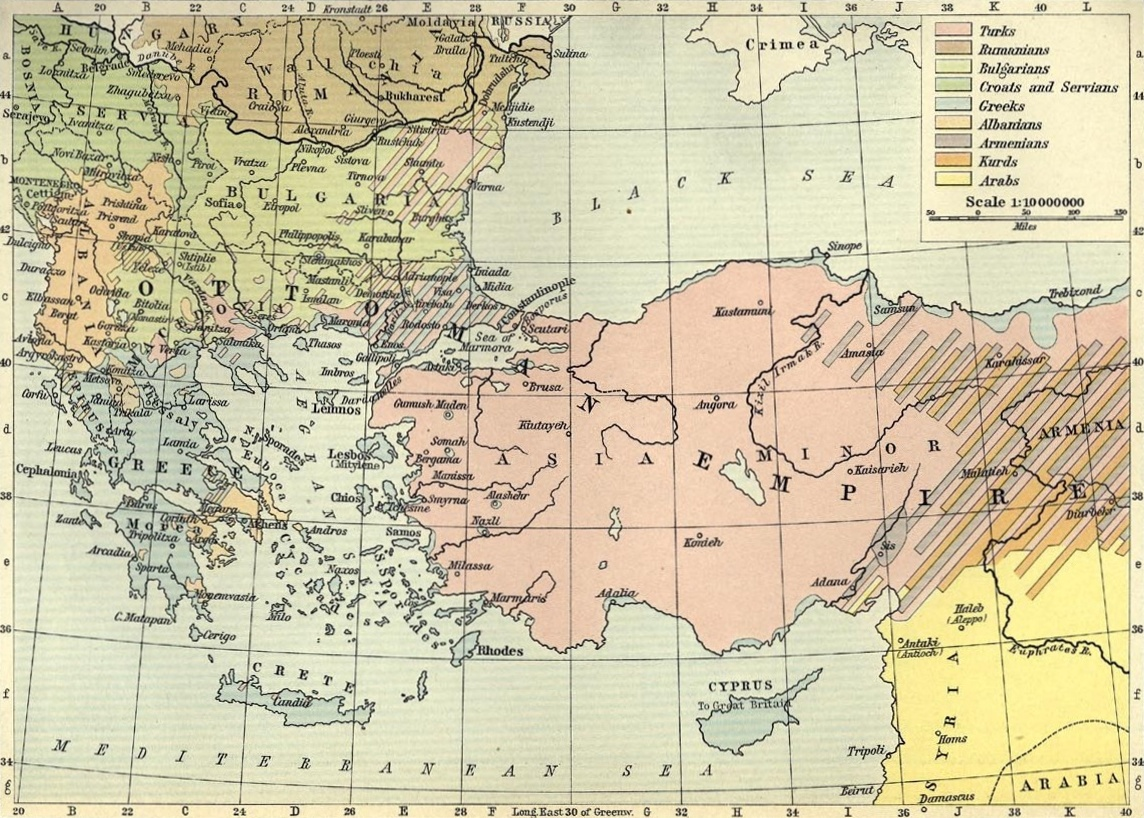
Ethnic map of Asia Minor in 1905–06

With the acceleration of the decline of the Ottoman Empire in the early 19th century, and as a result of the expansionist policies of the Russian Empire in the Caucasus, many Muslim nations and groups in that region, mainly Circassians, Crimean Tatars, Azeris, Lezgis, Chechens, Muslim Georgians, Hamshenis and several Turkic groups left their homelands and settled in Anatolia. As the Ottoman Empire further shrank in the Balkan regions and then fragmented during the Balkan Wars, much of the non-Christian populations of its former possessions, mainly Balkan Muslims (Bosniaks, Albanians, Turks, Serb Muslims, Muslim Bulgarians and Greek Muslims such as the Vallahades from Greek Macedonia), were resettled in various parts of Anatolia, mostly in formerly Christian villages throughout Anatolia.

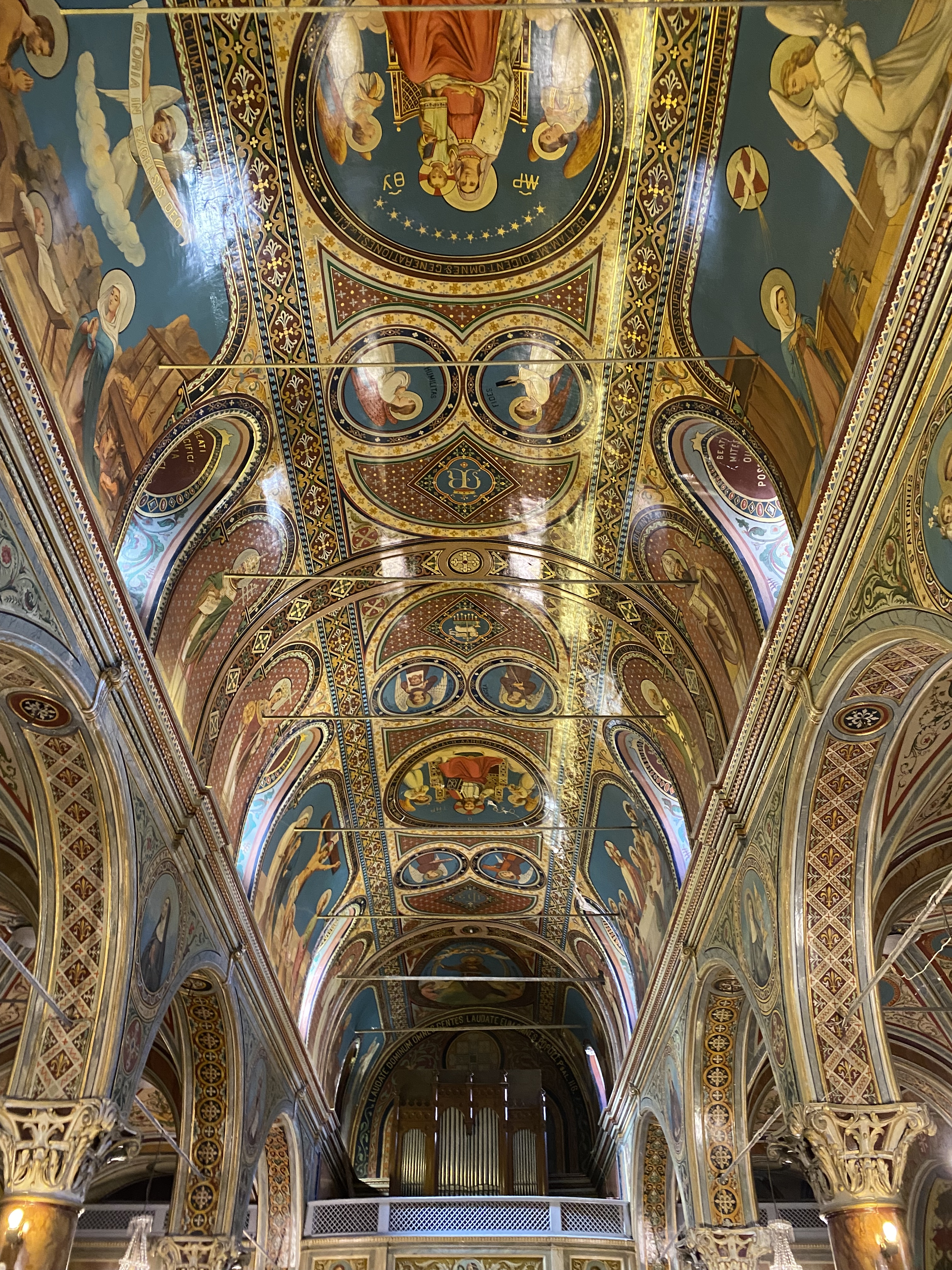
St. Polycarp Church, in modern-day Izmir

A continuous reverse migration occurred since the early 19th century, when Greeks from Anatolia, Constantinople and Pontus area migrated toward the newly independent Kingdom of Greece, and also towards the United States, the southern part of the Russian Empire, Latin America, and the rest of Europe.

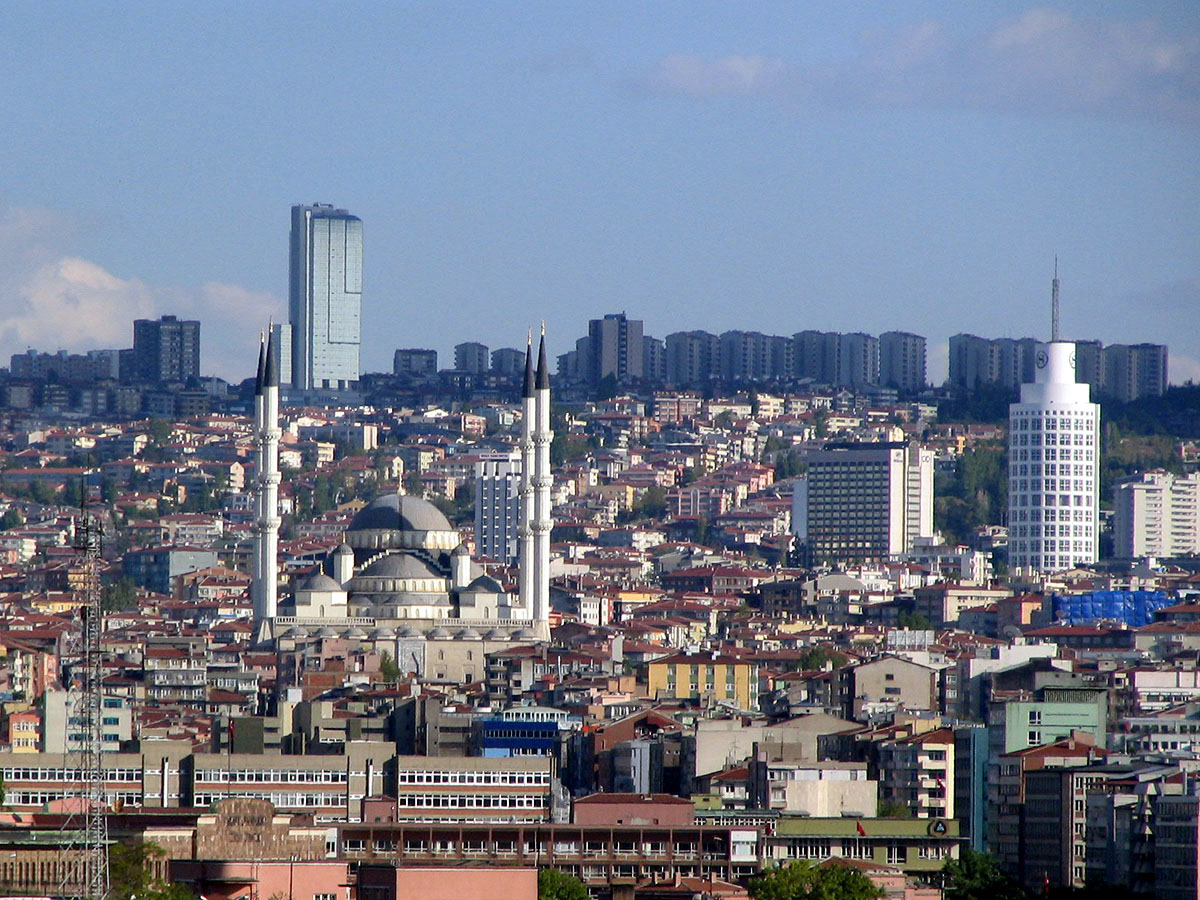
Mosque in Ankara

Following the Russo-Persian Treaty of Turkmenchay (1828) and the incorporation of Eastern Armenia into the Russian Empire, another migration involved the large Armenian population of Anatolia, which recorded significant migration rates from Western Armenia (Eastern Anatolia) toward the Russian Empire, especially toward its newly established Armenian provinces.

Anatolia remained multi-ethnic until the early 20th century (see the rise of nationalism under the Ottoman Empire). During World War I, the Armenian genocide, the Greek genocide (especially in Pontus), and the Assyrian genocide almost entirely removed the ancient indigenous communities of Armenian, Greek, and Assyrian populations in Anatolia and surrounding regions. Following the Greco-Turkish War of 1919–1922, most remaining ethnic Anatolian Greeks were forced out during the 1923 population exchange between Greece and Turkey. Of the remainder, most have left Turkey since then, leaving fewer than 5,000 Greeks in Anatolia today. According to Morris and Ze'evi, 4 million Christians were ethnically cleansed from Asia minor by the Turks from 1894 to 1924.

== Geology ==
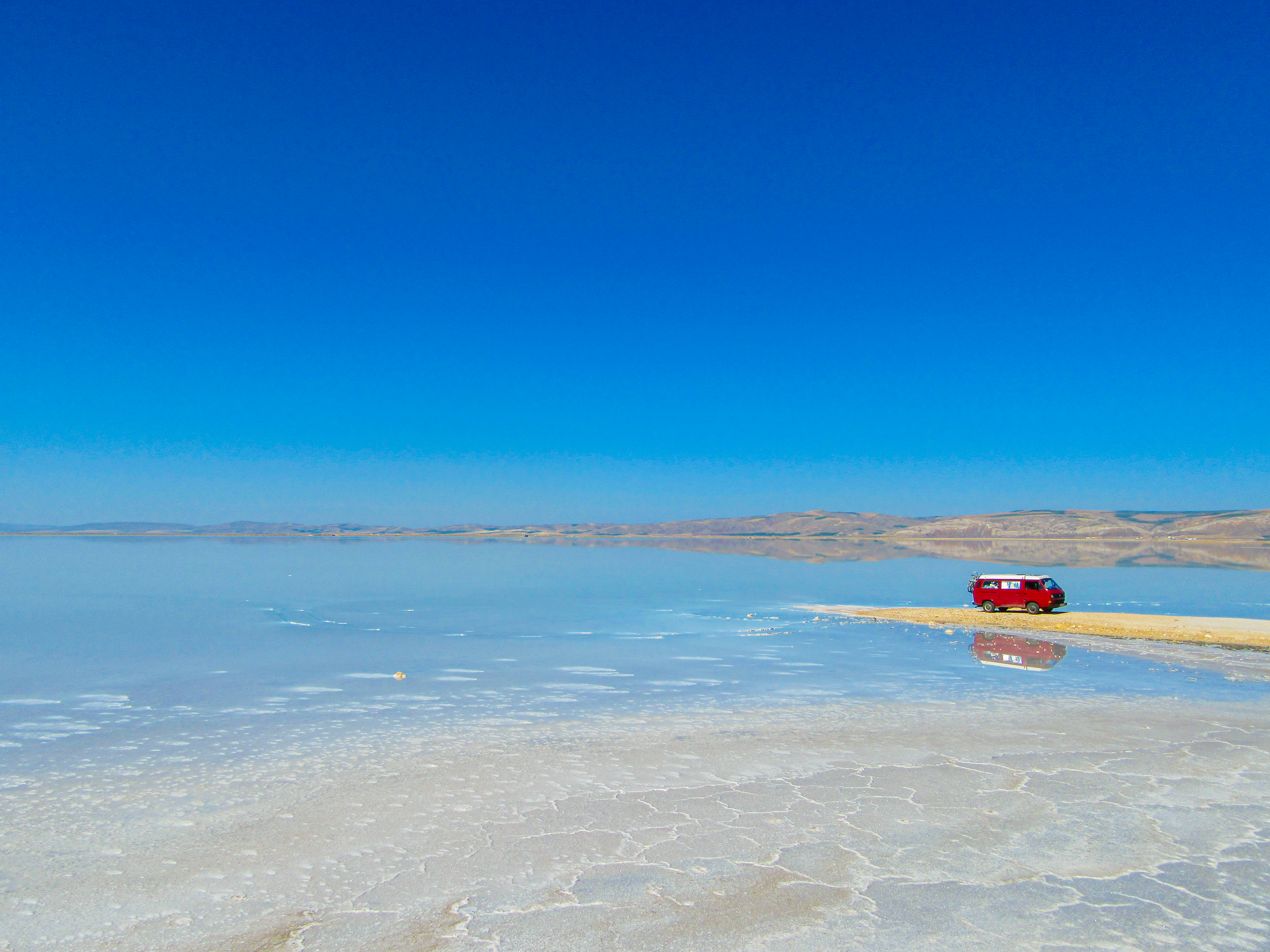
Salty shores of Lake Tuz

Anatolia's terrain is structurally complex. A central massif composed of uplifted blocks and downfolded troughs, covered by recent deposits and giving the appearance of a plateau with rough terrain, is wedged between two folded mountain ranges that converge in the east. True lowland is confined to a few narrow coastal strips along the Aegean, Mediterranean, and the Black Sea coasts. Flat or gently sloping land is rare and largely confined to the deltas of the Kızıl River, the coastal plains of Çukurova and the valley floors of the Gediz River and the Büyük Menderes River as well as some interior high plains in Anatolia, mainly around Lake Tuz (Salt Lake) and the Konya Basin (Konya Ovasi).

There are two mountain ranges in southern Anatolia: the Taurus and the Zagros Mountains.

=== Climate ===
Temperatures of Anatolia

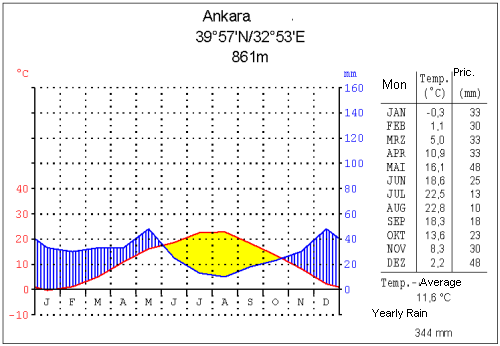
Ankara (central Anatolia)

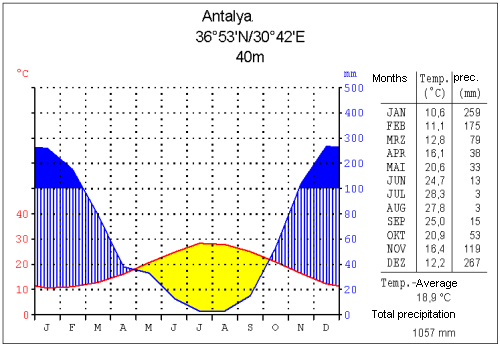
Antalya (southern Anatolia)

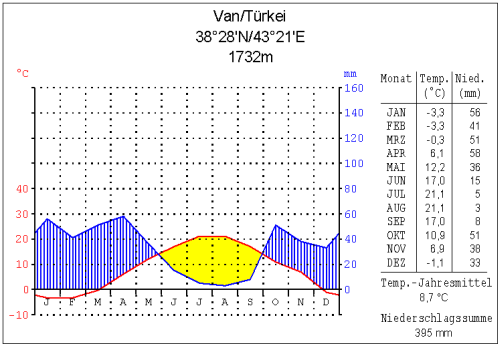
Van (eastern Anatolia)

Anatolia has a varied range of climates. The central plateau is characterized by a continental climate, with hot summers and cold, snowy winters. The south and west coasts enjoy a typical Mediterranean climate, with mild rainy winters and warm, dry summers. The Black Sea and Marmara coasts have a temperate oceanic climate, with warm, foggy summers and much rainfall throughout the year.

=== Ecoregions ===
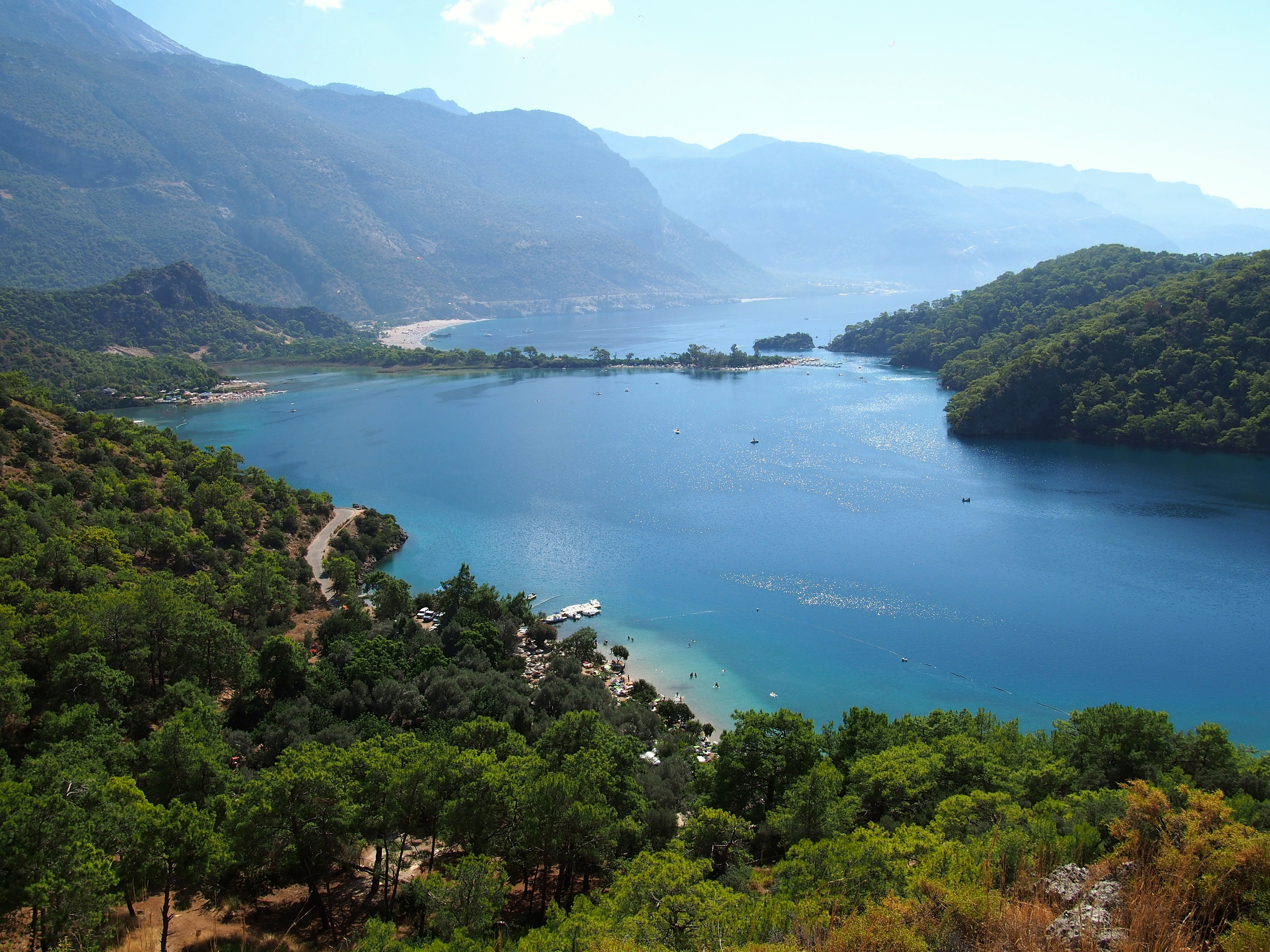
Mediterranean climate is prevalent in the Turkish Riviera.

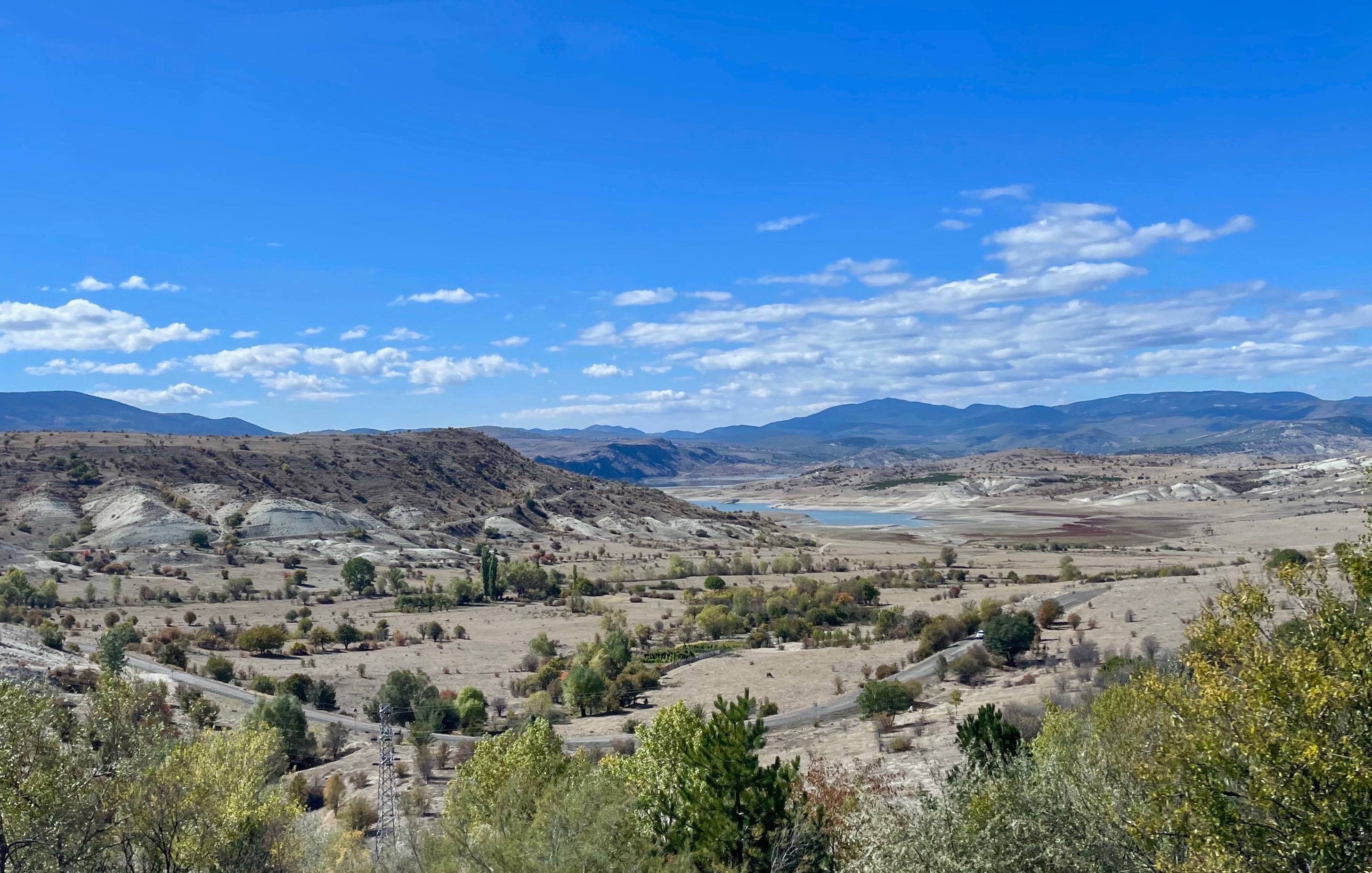
Anatolia's dry central plateau

There is a diverse number of plant and animal communities.

The mountains and coastal plain of northern Anatolia experience a humid and mild climate. There are temperate broadleaf, mixed and coniferous forests. The central and eastern plateau, with its drier continental climate, has deciduous forests and forest steppes. Western and southern Anatolia, which have a Mediterranean climate, contain Mediterranean forests, woodlands, and scrub ecoregions.

- Euxine-Colchic deciduous forests: These temperate broadleaf and mixed forests extend across northern Anatolia, lying between the mountains of northern Anatolia and the Black Sea. They include the enclaves of temperate rainforest lying along the southeastern coast of the Black Sea in eastern Turkey and Georgia.
- Northern Anatolian conifer and deciduous forests: These forests occupy the mountains of northern Anatolia, running east and west between the coastal Euxine-Colchic forests and the drier, continental climate forests of central and eastern Anatolia.
- Central Anatolian deciduous forests: These forests of deciduous oaks and evergreen pines cover the plateau of central Anatolia.
- Central Anatolian steppe: These dry grasslands cover the drier valleys and surround the saline lakes of central Anatolia, and include halophytic (salt-tolerant) plant communities.

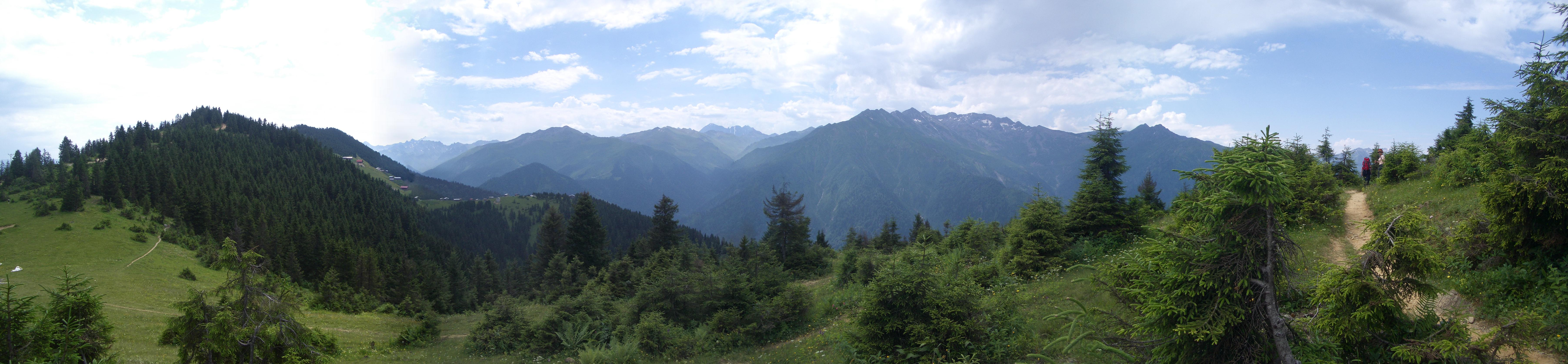
A panorama of the Pontic Mountains in the Black Sea Region of northern Anatolia, Turkey

- Eastern Anatolian deciduous forests: This ecoregion occupies the plateau of eastern Anatolia. The drier and more continental climate is beneficial for steppe-forests dominated by deciduous oaks, with areas of shrubland, montane forest, and valley forest.
- Anatolian conifer and deciduous mixed forests: These forests occupy the western, Mediterranean-climate portion of the Anatolian plateau. Pine forests, mixed pine, oak woodlands and shrublands are predominant.
- Aegean and Western Turkey sclerophyllous and mixed forests: These Mediterranean-climate forests occupy the coastal lowlands and valleys of western Anatolia bordering the Aegean Sea. The ecoregion has forests of Turkish pine (Pinus brutia), oak forests and woodlands, and maquis shrubland of Turkish pine and evergreen sclerophyllous trees and shrubs, including Olive (Olea europaea), Strawberry Tree (Arbutus unedo), Arbutus andrachne, Kermes Oak (Quercus coccifera), and Bay Laurel (Laurus nobilis).
- Southern Anatolian montane conifer and deciduous forests: These mountain forests occupy the Mediterranean-climate Taurus Mountains of southern Anatolia. Conifer forests are predominant, chiefly Anatolian black pine (Pinus nigra), cedar of Lebanon (Cedrus libani), Taurus fir (Abies cilicica), and juniper (Juniperus foetidissima and J. excelsa). Broadleaf trees include oaks, hornbeam, and maples.
- Eastern Mediterranean conifer-sclerophyllous-broadleaf forests: This ecoregion occupies the coastal strip of southern Anatolia between the Taurus Mountains and the Mediterranean Sea. Plant communities include broadleaf sclerophyllous maquis shrublands, forests of Aleppo pine (Pinus halepensis) and Turkish pine (Pinus brutia), and dry oak (Quercus spp.) woodlands and steppes.

== Demographics ==
The largest provinces in Anatolia (aside from the Asian side of Istanbul) are Ankara, İzmir, Bursa, Antalya, Konya, Adana, Kocaeli, Mersin, Manisa, Kayseri, Samsun, Balıkesir, Aydın, Maraş, Sakarya, Muğla, Denizli, Eskişehir, Trabzon, Ordu, Afyon, Sivas, Tokat, Zonguldak, Kütahya, Çanakkale, Osmaniye and Çorum. All have populations of more than 500,000.

== See also ==
- Aeolis
- Anatolian hypothesis
- Anatolianism
- Anatolian leopard
- Anatolian Plate
- Anatolian Shepherd
- Ancient kingdoms of Anatolia
- Antigonid dynasty
- Doris (Asia Minor)
- Empire of Nicaea
- Empire of Trebizond
- Gordium
- Lycaonia
- Midas
- Miletus
- Myra
- Pentarchy
- Pontic Greeks
- Rumi
- Saint Anatolia
- Saint John
- Saint Nicholas
- Saint Paul
- Seleucid Empire
- Seven churches of Asia
- Seven Sleepers
- Tarsus
- Troad
- Turkic migration
