= Geographical regions of Turkey =

Turkey's seven physically-distinct geographical regions

Regions of Turkey Türkiye'nin bölgeleri (Turkish)
- Regions (by number): Marmara region (1); Central Anatolia region (2); Black Sea region (3); Eastern Anatolia region (4); Aegean region (5); Mediterranean region (6); Southeastern Anatolia region (7)
- Category: Unitary state
- Location: (Turkey) Turkish Republic
- Number: 7
- Populations: 6,513,106 (Eastern Anatolia) – 26,650,405 (Marmara)
- Areas: 59,176 km^{2} (22,848 sq mi) (Southeastern Anatolia Region) – 165,436 km^{2} (63,875 sq mi) (Eastern Anatolia region)
- Government: Regional Government, National Government
- Subdivisions: Province

Map of the geographic regions, color-coded, with national (gray) and provincial borders (white). Geographical regions: Marmara region; Black Sea region; Aegean region; Mediterranean region; Central Anatolia region; Eastern Anatolia region; Southeastern Anatolia region

The geographical regions of Turkey comprise seven regions (Turkish: bölge), which were originally defined at the country's First Geography Congress in 1941. The regions are subdivided into 31 sections (Turkish: bölüm), which are further divided into numerous areas (Turkish: yöre), as defined by microclimates and bounded by local geographic formations.

"Regions" as defined in this context are merely for geographic, demographic, and economic purposes and do not refer to an administrative division.

== Regions and subregions ==
Region	Largest city	Area		Provinces (Counties)	Population (2021)	Location
Region	Largest city	km^{2}	sq mi	Provinces (Counties)	Population (2021)	Location
Aegean region	İzmir	85,000	33,000	8	10,477,153	
Black Sea region	Samsun	143,537	55,420	18	7,696,132	
Central Anatolia region	Ankara	163,057	62,957	13	12,896,255	
Eastern Anatolia region	Van	165,436	63,875	14	6,513,106	
Marmara region	Istanbul	67,000	26,000	11	26,650,405	
Mediterranean region	Antalya	122,927	47,462	8	10,584,506	
Southeastern Anatolia region	Şanlıurfa	59,176	22,848	9	8,576,391	

- Aegean region
  - Aegean Section
    - Edremit Area
    - Bakirçay Area
    - Gediz Area
    - İzmir Area
    - Küçük Menderes Area
    - Büyük Menderes Area
    - Mentese Area
  - Inner Western Anatolia Section
- Black Sea Region
  - Western Black Sea Section
    - Inner Black Sea Area
    - Küre Mountains Area
  - Central Black Sea Section
    - Canik Mountains Area
    - Inner Central Black Sea Area
  - Eastern Black Sea Section
    - Eastern Black Sea Coast Area
    - Upper Kelkit - Çoruh Gully Area
- Central Anatolia Region
  - Konya Section
    - Obruk Plateau
    - Konya - Ereğli Vicinity
  - Upper Sakarya Section
    - Ankara Area
    - Porsuk Gully Area
    - Sündiken Mountains Area
    - Upper Sakarya Area
    - Konya - Ereğli Vicinity
  - Middle Kizilirmak Section
  - Upper Kizilirmak Section
- Eastern Anatolia region
  - Upper Euphrates Section
  - Erzurum - Kars Section
  - Upper Murat - Van Section
    - Upper Murat Area
    - Van Area
  - Hakkâri Section
- Marmara Region
  - Çatalca - Kocaeli Section
    - Adapazarı Area
    - Istanbul Area
  - Ergene Section
  - Southern Marmara Section
    - Biga - Gallipoli Area
    - Bursa Area
    - Karesi Area
    - Samanlı Area
  - Yıldız Section
- Mediterranean Region
  - Adana Section
    - Çukurova - Taurus Mountains Area
    - Antakya - Kahramanmaras Area
  - Antalya Section
    - Antalya Area
    - Göller Area
    - Taseli - Mut Area
    - Teke Area
- Southeastern Anatolia Region
  - Middle Euphrates Section
    - Gaziantep Area
    - Şanlıurfa Area
  - Tigris Section
    - Diyarbakır Area
    - Mardin - Midyat Area

== Distinctions of the regions ==
The Aegean Region has:

- the longest coastline

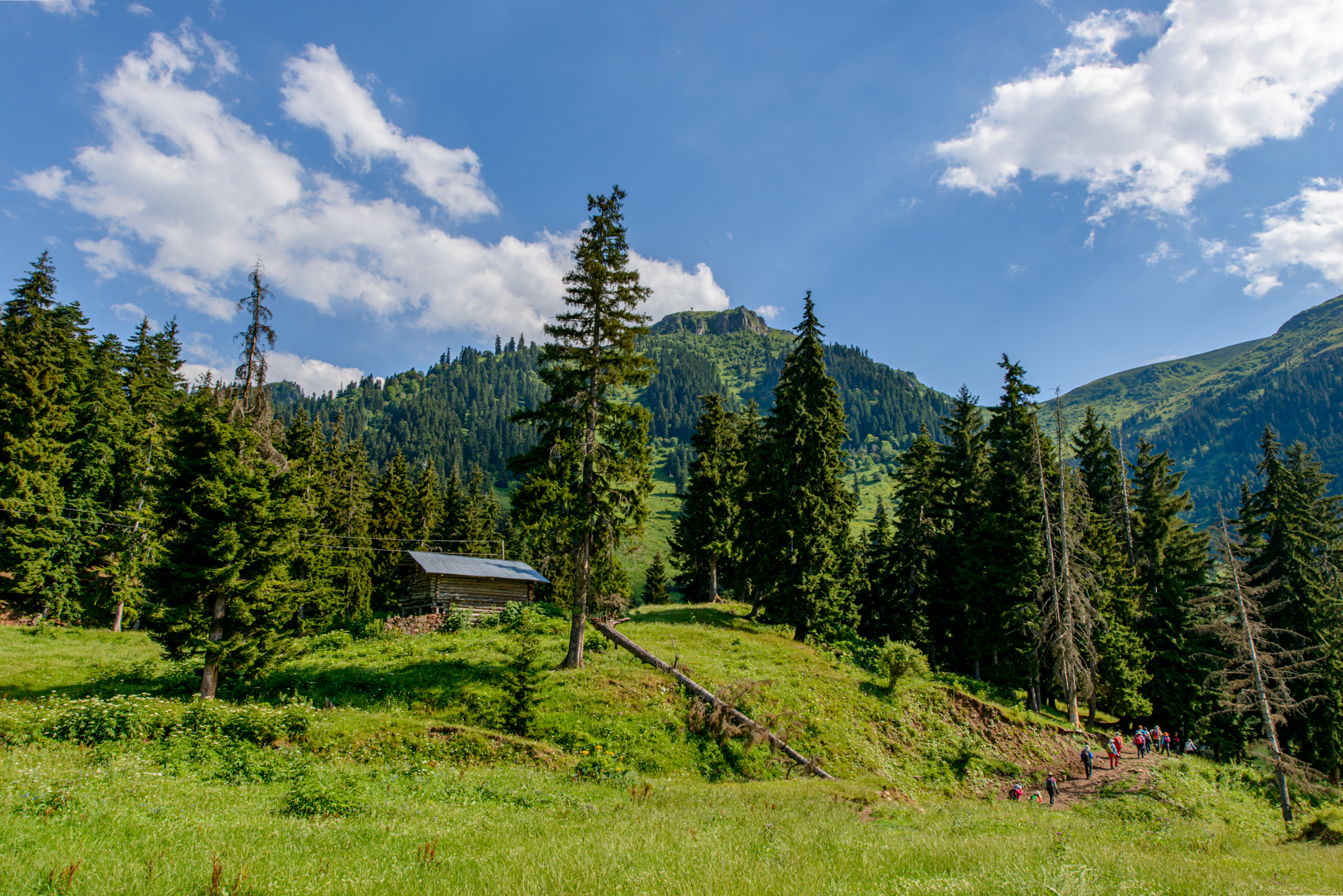
Artvin Province, East of the Blacksea Region

The Black Sea Region has:

- highest annual precipitation
- largest forest area
- fewest sunshine hours
- most landslides

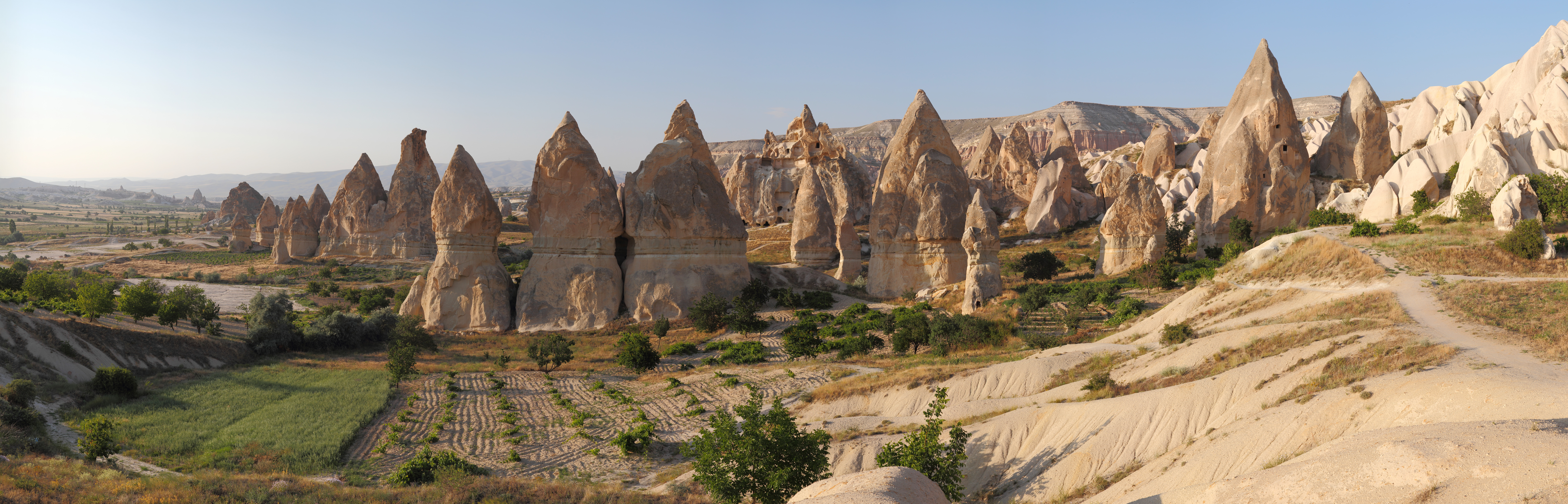
Cappadoccia and famous fairy chimneys rock formation

The Central Anatolia Region has:

- lowest annual precipitation,
- most erosion

The Eastern Anatolia Region has:

- largest area
- highest elevation
- lowest annual temperature
- coldest winters
- highest temperature difference between seasons
- most volcanic activity
- smallest population
- highest mineral resources

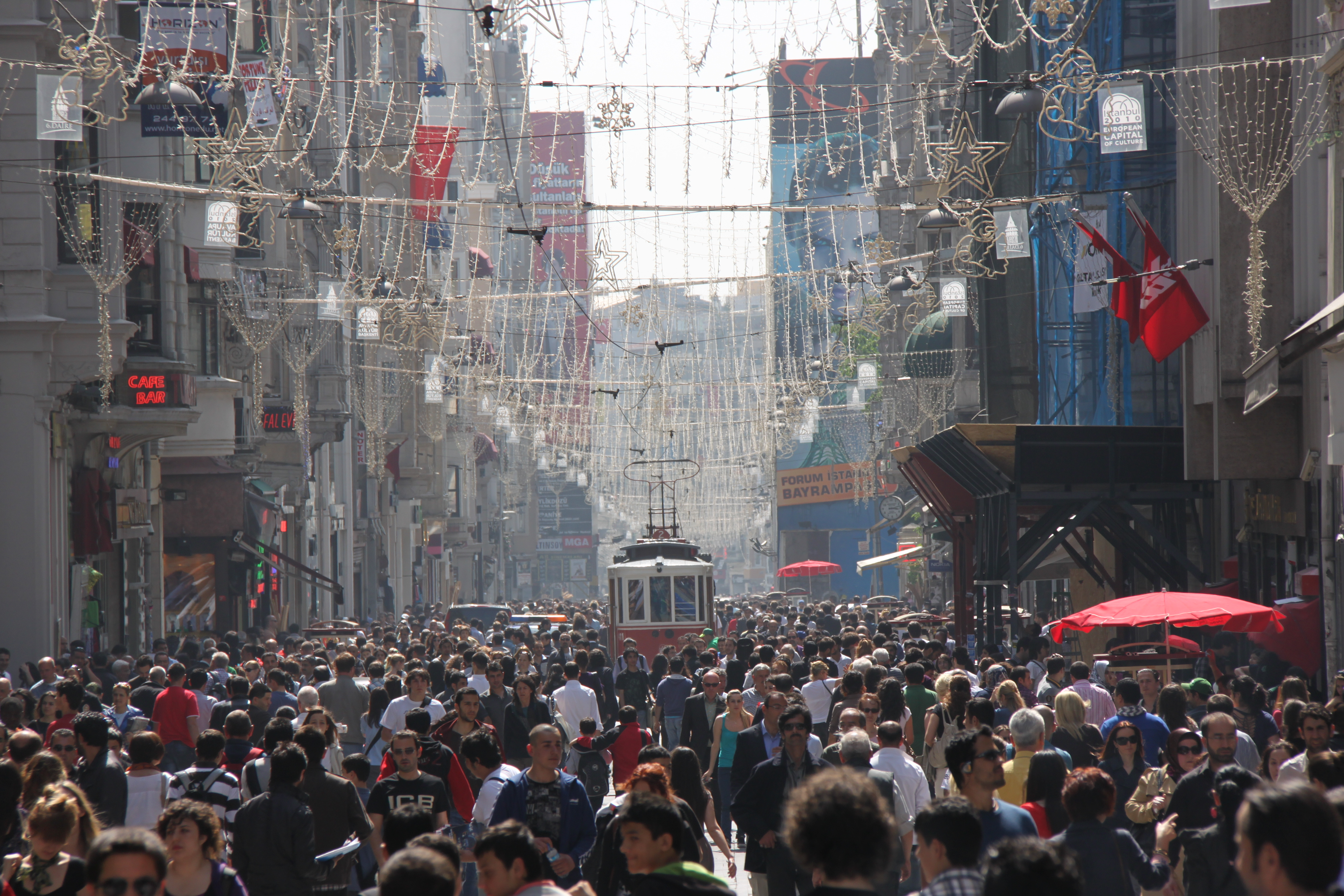
Istanbul, the most populous city in the Marmara Region and all of Turkey

The Marmara Region has:

- smallest area
- lowest elevation
- most climate diversity
- highest energy consumption,
- coolest summers,
- largest population

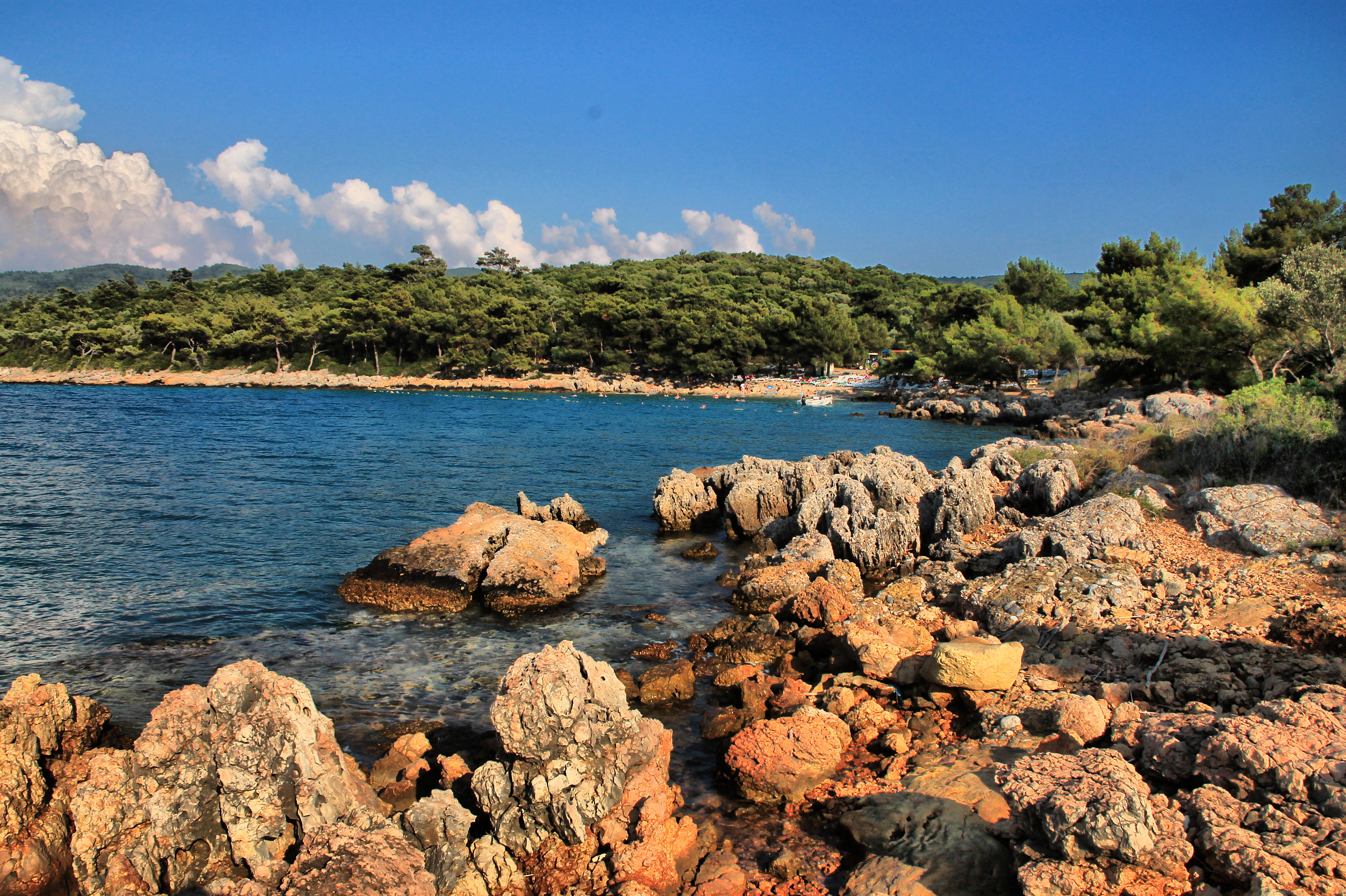
The Mediterranean Region is a well-known sea-tourism zone because of own climate.

The Mediterranean Region has:

- highest annual temperature
- mildest winters
- wettest winters,
- most greenhouse farming

The Southeastern Anatolia Region has:

- hottest summers
- driest summers
- smallest forest area
- most sunshine hours

== See also ==
- Provinces of Turkey
- Districts of Turkey
- Demographics of Turkey
- Villages of Turkey
- Metropolitan centers in Turkey
