= Nicholas of Sion =

6th-century Christian saint from Lycia

Nicholas of Sion was a 6th-century Christian saint from Pharroa in Lycia and Abbot of the monastery of Holy Sion. He died in Myra in 564 shortly after he was ordained bishop of Pinara. During the course of his lifetime, he travelled to Jerusalem twice and was reputed to have performed healing miracles. The identity of his hagiographer is not known, but scholars believe his biography was written sometime in the 6th or 7th centuries, presumably by a disciple of Nicholas at the monastery. The style of writing was more accessible than previous vitae written by the Cappadocian Fathers and some elements style seem to have been influenced by New Testament Greek. Nicholas' vita mostly takes place in a rural setting. His cult was later absorbed by that of Nicholas of Myra.
