= First Turkish Geography Congress =

1941 congress held in Ankara, Turkey

Color-coded geographical regions map of Turkey, with national and provincial borders superimposed in thicker gray and thinner white, respectively. The seven official geographical regions are the Marmara Region (dark green), the Black Sea Region (light green), the Aegean Region (blue), the Mediterranean Region (purple), the Central Anatolia Region (brown), the Eastern Anatolia region (orange), and the Southeastern Anatolia Region (yellow)

The First Geography Congress (Turkish: Birinci Türk Coğrafya Kongresi), which was held in Ankara in 1941, separated Turkey into seven geographical regions, which are still used today.

== Overview ==
The congress took numerous factors into consideration when defining these regions, including the fact that Turkey is surrounded by sea on three sides and the presence of mountain ranges lying parallel to the length of the coastline that isolate the central section from the influence of the sea. Based on these factors and the resulting differences in the climate, natural plant cover and the distribution of types of agriculture, as well as the influences of these on the transportation systems and types of housing, the congress divided Turkey into four coastal and three central regions.

The coastal regions were named after the seas to which they are adjacent (the Black Sea, the Marmara, the Aegean and the Mediterranean Regions). The central regions were named according to their location in the whole of Anatolia (Central, Eastern and Southeastern Anatolia Regions).

== Analysis ==
The Eastern Anatolia Region largely corresponds to the western part of the Armenian highlands. According to historian Richard G. Hovannisian, this changing of toponyms was "necessary to obscure all evidence" of the Armenian presence in the area, as part of the policy of Armenian genocide denial embarked upon by the newly established Turkish government and what Hovannisian calls its "foreign collaborators".
