= List of endemic plants of Sicily =

Sicily is the largest island in the Mediterranean Sea, and is home to dozens of endemic species and subspecies of plants, including the endemic genera Petagnaea and Siculosciadium. Although it is politically part of Italy, the World Geographical Scheme for Recording Plant Distributions treats Sicily as distinct botanical country together with neighboring islands and island groups including Malta (a sovereign country comprising two main islands, Malta and Gozo), the Aegadian Islands, Aeolian Islands, Lampedusa, Pantelleria, Pelagian Islands, and Ustica.

Plants are listed alphabetically by plant family. Extinct and presumed extinct species are indicated with †.

== Amaranthaceae ==
- Arthrocaulon meridionalis Est.Ramírez, Rufo, Sánchez Mata & Fuente – western Sicily
- Atriplex lanfrancoi (Brullo & Pavone) G.Kadereit & Sukhor. – Malta and Gozo
- Caroxylon agrigentinum (Guss.) C.Brullo, Brullo, Giusso, Guarino & Iamonico – central Sicily
- Salsola basaltica (C.Brullo, Brullo, Gaskin, Giusso, Hrusa & Salmeri) C.Brullo & Brullo
- Salsola melitensis Botsch. – Malta
- †Suaeda kocheri Guss. ex C.Brullo, Brullo & Giusso – southern Sicily
- Suaeda pelagica Bartolo, Brullo & P.Pavone – Lampedusa

== Amaryllidaceae ==
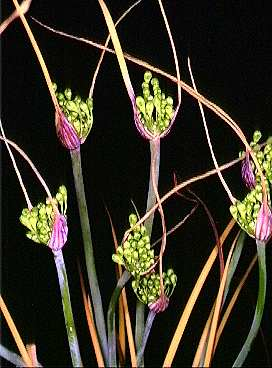
Allium nebrodense

- Allium aetnense Brullo, Pavone & Salmeri
- Allium agrigentinum Brullo & Pavone
- Allium castellanense (Garbari, Miceli & Raimondo) Brullo, Guglielmo, Pavone & Salmeri
- Allium franciniae Brullo & Pavone – Aegadian Islands
- Allium hemisphaericum (Sommier) Brullo
- Allium lojaconoi Brullo, Lanfr. & Pavone – Malta
- Allium lopadusanum Bartolo, Brullo & Pavone – Lampedusa
- Allium nebrodense Guss.
- Allium obtusiflorum Redouté
- Allium panormitanum Brullo, Pavone & Salmeri
- Allium pelagicum Brullo, Pavone & Salmeri
- Allium sphaerocephalon subsp. laxiflorum (Guss.) Giardina & Raimondo

== Apiaceae ==
- Bupleurum dianthifolium Guss. – Sicily (northern Marettimo I.)
- Bupleurum elatum Guss. – northern Sicily (Madonie Mountains)
- Daucus carota subsp. rupestris (Guss.) Heywood – Malta, Lampedusa, Lampesina
- Eryngium tricuspidatum subsp. bocconei (Lam.) Wörz
- Eryngium tricuspidatum subsp. tricuspidatum
- Ferula melitensis Brullo, C.Brullo, Cambria, Giusso, Salmeri & Bacch. – Malta
- Ferula sommieriana Cambria, C.Brullo, Tavilla, Sciandr., Miniss., Giusso & Brul
- Ferulago nodosa subsp. geniculata (Guss.) Troìa & Raimondo
- Petagnaea Caruel
  - Petagnaea gussonei (Spreng.) Rauschert – northern Sicily
- Pimpinella tragium subsp. glauca (C.Presl) C.Brullo & Brullo
- Siculosciadium C.Brullo, Brullo, S.R.Downie & Giusso
  - Siculosciadium nebrodense (Guss.) C.Brullo, Brullo, S.R.Downie & Giusso – Sicily (Madonie Mountains)
- Siler siculum (Spreng.) Thell. – northern Sicily
- Smyrnium perfoliatum subsp. dimartinoi (Raimondo, Mazzola & Spadaro) Stinca & Pignatti
- Thapsia garganica subsp. messanensis (Guss.) Brullo, Guglielmo, Pasta, Pavone & Salmeri
- Thapsia pelagica Brullo, Guglielmo, Pasta, Pavone & Salmeri

== Aristolochiaceae ==
- Aristolochia sicula Tineo

== Asparagaceae ==
- Prospero hierae C.Brullo, Brullo, Giusso, Pavone & Salmeri – Marettimo
- Scilla dimartinoi Brullo & Pavone – Lampedusa

== Asteraceae ==
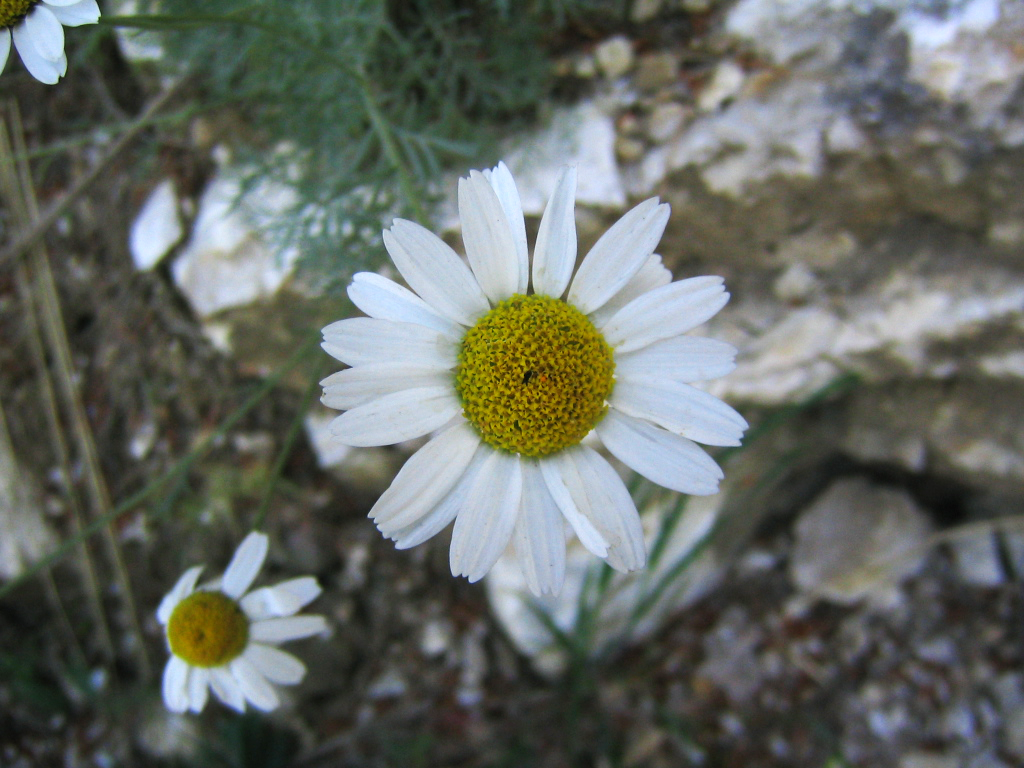
Anthemis cupaniana

- Adenostyles alpina subsp. nebrodensis (Wagenitz & I.Müll.) Greuter
- Anthemis aeolica Lojac.
- Anthemis aetnensis Spreng. – Sicily (Mount Etna)
- Anthemis concolor Lojac.
- Anthemis cretica subsp. messanensis (Brullo) Giardina & Raimondo
- Anthemis cupaniana Tod. ex Nyman
- Anthemis ismelia Lojac. – western Sicily
- Anthemis muricata (DC.) Guss. – western Sicily
- Anthemis parlatoreana Raimondo, Bajona, Spadaro & Di Grist.
- Anthemis pignattiorum Guarino, Raimondo & Domina
- Anthemis pseudoabrotanifolia C.Brullo, Brullo & Giusso
- Carduus membranaceus Lojac.
- Carduus nutans subsp. siculus (Franco) Greuter
- Carduus pycnocephalus subsp. intermedius (Lojac.) Giardina & Raimondo
- Carlina sicula var. longibracteata (Cavara) Meusel & A.Kástner
- Carlina sicula subsp. sicula
- Centaurea aeolica Guss. ex Lojac. – Aeolian Islands
- Centaurea erycina Raimondo & Bancheva
- Centaurea giardinae Raimondo & Spadaro – Sicily (Mount Etna)
- Centaurea gussonei Raimondo & Spadaro – northeastern Sicily
- Centaurea lacaitae Peruzzi
- Centaurea macroacantha Guss.
- Centaurea panormitana Lojac.
  - Centaurea panormitana subsp. aegusae (Domina, Greuter & Raimondo) Guarino & Pignatti – Favignana I.
  - Centaurea panormitana subsp. panormitana
  - Centaurea panormitana subsp. todaroi (Lacaita) Greuter
  - Centaurea panormitana subsp. ucriae (Lacaita) Greuter
  - Centaurea panormitana subsp. umbrosa (Fiori) Greuter
- Centaurea parlatoris Heldr. – northwestern and north-central Sicily
- Centaurea phalacrica Brullo, Cambria, Crisafulli, Tavilla & Sciandr.
- Centaurea saccensis Raimondo, Bancheva & Ilardi
- Centaurea seguenzae (Lacaita) Brullo, Marcenò & Siracusa
- Centaurea sicana Raimondo & Spadaro – west-central Sicily
- Centaurea tauromenitana Guss.
- Centaurea valdemonensis Domina, Di Grist. & Barone
- Centaurea virescens (Guss.) Domina & Raimondo
- Cheirolophus crassifolius (Bertol.) Susanna – Malta and Gozo
- Chiliadenus bocconei Brullo – Malta
- Chiliadenus lopadusanus Brullo – Lampedusa
- Crepis paniculas C.Presl
- Crepis vesicaria subsp. bivonana (Soldano & F.Conti) Giardina & Raimondo
- Cynara cardunculus subsp. zingaroensis (Raimondo & Domina) Raimondo & Domina
- Filago lojaconoi (Brullo) Greuter
- Helichrysum errerae Tineo – Pantelleria
- Helichrysum errerae var. errerae – Pantelleria
- Helichrysum errerae var. messerii (Pignatti) Raimondo
- Helichrysum hyblaeum Brullo
- Helichrysum nebrodense Heldr.
- Helichrysum panormitanum Tineo ex Guss.
  - Helichrysum panormitanum subsp. brulloi Iamonico & Pignatti
  - Helichrysum panormitanum subsp. melitense (Pignatti) Iamonico & Pignatti – Malta
  - Helichrysum panormitanum subsp. panormitanum
  - Helichrysum panormitanum var. stramineum (Guss.) Raimondo
- Hieracium aetnense (Gottschl., Raimondo & Di Grist.) C.Brullo & Brullo – Sicily (Mount Etna)
- Hieracium busambarense Caldarella, Gianguzzi & Gottschl. – west-central Sicily
- Hieracium hypochoeroides subsp. montis-scuderii Di Grist., Gottschl., Galesi, Raimondo & Cristaudo – northeastern Sicily (Monte Scuderi)
- Hieracium lucidum Guss. – northwestern Sicily
- Hieracium murorum subsp. atrovirens (Froel.) Raimondo & Di Grist. – northern Sicily
- Hieracium pallidum subsp. pallidum – northern and northeastern Sicily
- Hieracium racemosum subsp. pignattianum (Raimondo & Di Grist.) Greuter – northern Sicily
- Hieracium schmidtii subsp. madoniense (Raimondo & Di Grist.) Greuter – northern Sicily
- Hieracium schmidtii subsp. nebrodense (Tineo) Di Grist., Gottschl. & Raimondo – northern Sicily
- Hieracium symphytifolium Froel. – northern Sicily
- Jacobaea ambigua subsp. ambigua
- Jacobaea candida (C.Presl) B.Nord. & Greuter – northern Sicily
- Jacobaea maritima subsp. sicula N.G.Passal., Peruzzi & Pellegrino – Sicily and Malta
- Jurinea bocconei Guss.
- Lophiolepis vallis-demonii subsp. vallis-demonii
- Pilosella hoppeana subsp. sicula Di Grist., Gottschl. & Raimondo
- Ptilostemon greuteri Raimondo & Domina
- Senecio aegadensis C.Brullo & Brullo – western Sicily
- Senecio aethnensis Jan ex DC. – northeastern Sicily
- Senecio × glaber Ucria (S. aethnensis × S. siculus) – northeastern Sicily
- Senecio vernus Biv. – western Sicily
- Tanacetum vulgare subsp. siculum (Guss.) Raimondo & Spadaro
- Taraxacum garbarianum Peruzzi, Aquaro, Caparelli & Raimondo
- Tolpis gussonei (Fiori) C.Brullo & Brullo
- Tripolium sorrentinoi (Tod.) Raimondo & Greuter

== Boraginaceae ==
- Echium italicum subsp. siculum (Lacaita) Greuter & Burdet
- Myosotis tineoi C.Brullo & Brullo
- Onosma echioides subsp. canescens (C.Presl) Peruzzi & N.G.Passal.
- Symphytum gussonei F.W.Schultz

== Brassicaceae ==
- Aubrieta columnae subsp. sicula (Strobl) M.Koch, D.A.German & R.Karl – northern Sicily
- Brassica incana subsp. raimondoi (Sciandr., C.Brullo, Brullo, Giusso, Miniss. & Salmeri) Raimondo & Spadaro
- Brassica macrocarpa Guss. – Aegadian Islands
- Brassica rupestris subsp. hispida Raimondo & Mazzola
- Brassica rupestris subsp. tardarae (Ilardi, Geraci & Troìa) Raimondo – southern Sicily
- Brassica villosa Biv.
  - Brassica villosa subsp. bivoniana (Mazzola & Raimondo) Raimondo & Mazzola – western Sicily
  - Brassica villosa subsp. brevisiliqua (Raimondo & Mazzola) Raimondo & Geraci
  - Brassica villosa subsp. drepanensis (Caruel) Raimondo & Mazzola – northwestern Sicily
  - Brassica villosa subsp. tineoi (Lojac.) Raimondo & Mazzola
  - Brassica villosa subsp. villosa – northwestern Sicily
- Cardamine dubia Nicotra
- Draba olympicoides Strobl
- Draba turgida É.Huet & A.Huet ex Ces., Pass. & Gibelli
  - Draba turgida subsp. eriocarpa (Guss.) Pignatti
  - Draba turgida subsp. turgida
- Erysimum bonannianum C.Presl – northern and west-central Sicily
- Erysimum brulloi G.Ferro – Alicudi Island
- Erysimum etnense Jord. – northeastern and central-eastern Sicily
- Erysimum metlesicsii Polatschek – north-central and south-central Sicily
- Matthiola incana subsp. glandulifera (Lojac.) C.Brullo & Brullo
- Matthiola incana subsp. melitensis Brullo, Lanfr., Pavone & Ronsisv. – northern Malta and Gozo
- Matthiola incana subsp. pulchella (Conti) Brullo & Furnari – Pantelleria
- Odontarrhena nebrodensis subsp. nebrodensis – northern Sicily

== Campanulaceae ==
- Campanula marcenoi Brullo
- Solenopsis bivonae subsp. bivonae – northwestern Sicily
- Solenopsis bivonae subsp. madoniarum Brullo, C.Brullo, Cambria, V.Tomas., Miniss. & Giusso – northern Sicily
- Solenopsis bivonae subsp. peloritana Brullo, C.Brullo, Cambria, V.Tomas., Crisafulli, Miniss. & G
- Solenopsis mothiana C.Brullo, Brullo & Giusso – western Sicily
- Trachelium × halteratum (Bianca ex Ces., Pass. & Gibelli) Sandwith (T. caeruleum × T. lanceolatum)
- Trachelium lanceolatum Guss.

== Cannabaceae ==
- Celtis tournefortii subsp. aetnensis (Tornab.) Raimondo & Schicchi

== Caprifoliaceae ==
- Pseudoscabiosa limonifolia (Vahl) Devesa
- Scabiosa cephalarioides Lojac.

== Caryophyllaceae ==
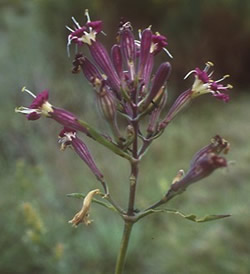
Silene hicesiae

- Cerastium tomentosum var. aetnaeum (Jan) Gürke – Sicily (Mount Etna)
- Dianthus busambrae Soldano & F.Conti – northern Sicily
- Dianthus gasparrinii Guss. – northern Sicily
- Dianthus graminifolius C.Presl
- Dianthus rupicola subsp. aeolicus (Lojac.) Brullo & Miniss. – northeastern Sicily and Aeolian Islands
- Dianthus rupicola subsp. lopadusanus Brullo & Miniss. – Lampedusa
- Dianthus siculus C.Presl – northern Sicily
- †Herniaria fontanesii subsp. empedocleana (Lojac.) Brullo – southern Sicily
- Petrorhagia saxifraga subsp. gasparrinii (Guss.) Pignatti ex Greuter & Burdet
- Scleranthus annuus subsp. aetnensis (Strobl) Pignatti – Sicily (Mount Etna)
- Scleranthus perennis subsp. stroblii (Rchb. ex Strobl) Giardina & Raimondo
- Scleranthus perennis subsp. vulcanicus (Strobl) Bég. – Sicily (Mount Etna)
- Silene crassiuscula Brullo, C.Brullo, Cambria, Bacch., Giusso & Ilardi
- Silene hicesiae Brullo & Signor. – Sicily (Panarea I. near Palermo)
- Silene kemoniana C.Brullo, Brullo, Giusso, Ilardi & Sciandr.
- Silene minae Strobl
- Silene nefelites C.Brullo, Brullo, Giusso & Ilardi
- Silene peloritana C.Brullo, Brullo, Giusso, Miniss. & Sciandr. – northeastern Sicily
- Silene saxifraga subsp. rupicola (Nyman) C.Brullo & Brullo
- †Silene vulgaris subsp. aetnensis (Strobl) Pignatti – Sicily (western Mount Etna)
- Spergularia madoniaca Lojac. – northern Sicily

== Cistaceae ==
- Helianthemum oelandicum subsp. nebrodense (Heldr. ex Guss.) Greuter & Burdet
- Helianthemum sicanorum Brullo, Giusso & Sciandr.

== Convolvulaceae ==
- Convolvulus cneorum var. cneorum

== Crassulaceae ==
- Crassula basaltica Brullo & Siracusa – Sicily (Mount Etna)
- Sedum album subsp. rupimelitense Mifsud, R.Stephenson & Thiede – Malta
- Sedum gypsicola subsp. trinacriae Afferni

== Cupressaceae ==
- Juniperus communis var. hemisphaerica (J.Presl & C.Presl) Parl. – Sicily (Mount Etna)

== Elatinaceae ==
- Elatine gussonei (Sommier) Brullo, Lanfr., Pavone & Ronsisv. – Malta and Gozo, Lampedusa

== Ephedraceae ==
- Ephedra aurea Brullo, C.Brullo, Cambria, Ilardi, Siracusa & Giusso
- Ephedra strongylensis Brullo, C.Brullo, Cambria, Ilardi, Siracusa, Miniss. & Giuss – Aeolian Islands

== Euphorbiaceae ==
- Euphorbia melitensis Parl. – Malta
- Euphorbia papillaris (Boiss.) Raffaelli & Ricceri – Aegadian Islands
- Euphorbia sommieriana C.Brullo & Brullo – Malta and Lampedusa

== Fabaceae ==
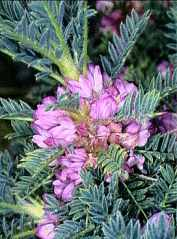
Astragalus siculus

- Adenocarpus complicatus subsp. bivonae (C.Presl) Peruzzi – Sicily (Mount Etna)
- Anthyllis hermanniae subsp. melitensis Brullo & Giusso – Malta
- †Anthyllis hermanniae subsp. sicula Brullo & Giusso – southern Sicily
- Anthyllis vulneraria subsp. busambarensis (Akeroyd) Pignatti
- Astragalus caprinus subsp. huetii (Bunge) Podlech
- Astragalus kamarinensis C.Brullo, Brullo, Giusso, Miniss. & Sciandr.
- Astragalus nebrodensis (Guss.) Strobl – northern Sicily
- Astragalus raphaelis G.Ferro
- Astragalus siculus Biv. – northern and northeastern Sicily
- Bituminaria basaltica Miniss., C.Brullo, Brullo, Giusso & Sciandr.
- Cytisus aeolicus Guss. – Vulcano, Lipari, and Stromboli
- Genista aristata C.Presl
- Genista cupanii Guss. – northern Sicily
- Genista demarcoi Brullo, Scelsi & Siracusa – northern Sicily
- Genista etnensis subsp. etnensis
- Genista gasparrinii (Guss.) C.Presl – northern Sicily (Mt. Gallo)
- Genista madoniensis Raimondo
- Genista tyrrhena subsp. tyrrhena – Aeolian Islands
- Lupinus albus subsp. albus
- Trifolium bivonae Guss.
- Trifolium mutabile subsp. gussoneanum (Gibelli & Belli) C.Brullo & Brullo
- Vicia brulloi Sciandr., Giusso, Salmeri & Miniss.

== Fagaceae ==
- Quercus × fontanesii Guss. (Q. gussonei × Q. suber) – northern Sicily
- Quercus gussonei (Borzì) Brullo – northern Sicily

== Iridaceae ==
- Crocus siculus Tineo – northern Sicily
- Iris pseudopumila subsp. gozoensis N.Service – Gozo
- Iris statellae Tod.
- Romulea × melitensis Bég. – Malta and Gozo
- Romulea variicolor Mifsud – Malta
  - Romulea variicolor var. martynii Mifsud – Malta
  - Romulea variicolor var. mirandae Mifsud – Malta
  - Romulea variicolor var. variicolor – Malta

== Isoetaceae ==
- Isoetes × angeloi D.F.Brunt. & K.L.McIntosh (I. gymnocarpa × I. longissima)

== Lamiaceae ==
- Clinopodium canescens (J.Presl) Melnikov
- Clinopodium minae (Lojac.) Peruzzi & F.Conti
- Origanum × nebrodense Tineo ex Lojac. (O. majorana × O. vulgare subsp. viridulum)
- Thymus paronychioides Čelak.
- Thymus praecox subsp. parvulus (Lojac.) Bartolucci, Peruzzi & N.G.Passal. – northeastern Sicily
- Thymus richardii subsp. nitidus (Guss.) Jalas – Sicily (Marettimo I.)

== Liliaceae ==
- Gagea sicula Lojac.

== Linaceae ==
- Linum punctatum subsp. punctatum

== Oleaceae ==
- Fraxinus excelsior subsp. siciliensis Ilardi & Raimondo

== Onagraceae ==
- Epilobium × brevipilum nothosubsp. nebrodense (Strobl ex Hausskn.) Deschâtres (E. hirsutum × E. tetragonum subsp. tournefortii)

== Orchidaceae ==
- Anacamptis pyramidalis var. urvilleana (Sommier & Caruana) Schltr. – Malta
- Anacamptis × semisaccata nothosubsp. santamariotae (Galesi & M.P.Grasso) H.Kretzschmar, Eccarius & H.Dietr. (A. collina × A. morio subsp. longicornu)
- Epipactis cupaniana C.Brullo, D'Emerico & Pulv.
- Epipactis × nicolosii M.P.Grasso & Grillo (E. helleborine × E. meridionalis)
- Neotinea commutata (Tod.) R.M.Bateman
- Ophrys × benoitiana Tineo ex Lojac. (O. lunulata × O. sphegodes subsp. atrata)
- Ophrys × cugniensis Soca (O. bertolonii × O. lutea)
- Ophrys × denisiana H.Baumann, Künkele & R.Lorenz (O. bertolonii × O. speculum)
- Ophrys holosericea subsp. biancae (Tod.) Faurh. & H.A.Pedersen
- Ophrys × lidbergii Mazzola (O. lunulata × O. tenthredinifera)
- Ophrys lunulata Parl.
- Ophrys lutea subsp. laurensis (Geniez & Melki) Kreutz – Sicily (Monte Lauro)
- Ophrys × mazzolana Falci, S.A.Giardina & Serio (O. bertolonii × O. lunulata × O. sphegodes subsp. sphegodes)
- Ophrys × montis-grossi Kohlmüller (O. holosericea subsp. oxyrrhynchos × O. speculum)
- Ophrys × sicana H.Baumann & Künkele (O. holosericea subsp. oxyrrhynchos × O. lunulata)
- Ophrys × syracusana O.Danesch & E.Danesch (O. lunulata × O. speculum)
- Ophrys × vittoriana H.Baumann & Künkele (O. bertolonii × O. lunulata)
- × Orchinea razzarae (Galesi) F.M.Vázquez (Neotinea lactea × Orchis italica)
- Serapias frankavillae Cristaudo, Galesi & R.Lorenz

== Orobanchaceae ==
- Odontites bocconei (Guss.) Walp.
- Odontites vulgaris subsp. siculus (Guss.) Bolliger
- Orobanche chironii Lojac.

== Papaveraceae ==
- Papaver rhoeas var. himerense Raimondo & Spadaro

== Pinaceae ==
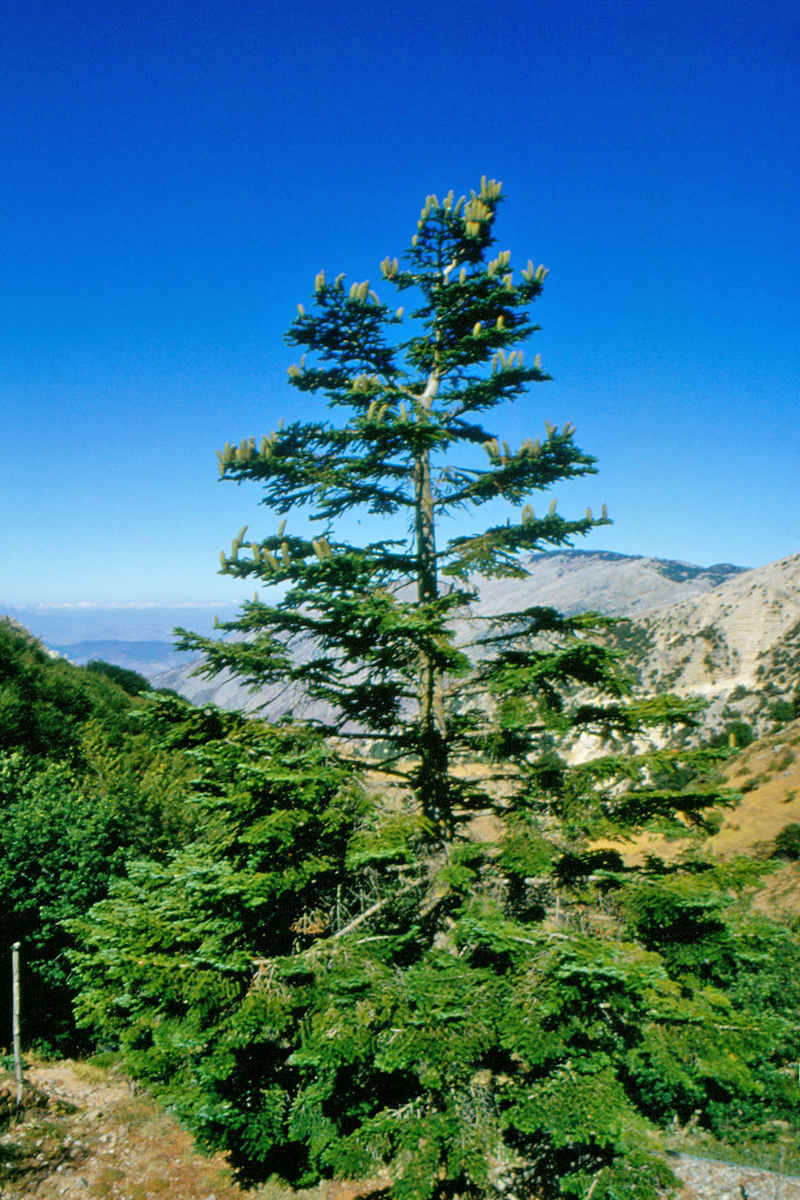
Abies nebrodensis

- Abies nebrodensis (Lojac.) Mattei – northern Sicily

== Plantaginaceae ==
- Cymbalaria pubescens (J.Presl & C.Presl) Cufod. – northern and southeastern Sicily
- Linaria multicaulis subsp. aetnensis Giardina & Zizza
- Linaria multicaulis subsp. humilis (Guss.) De Leon., Giardina & Zizza – southern Sicily
- Linaria multicaulis var. messanensis Giardina & Zizza
- Linaria multicaulis subsp. panormitana (Giardina & Zizza) C.Brullo & Brullo
- Linaria pseudolaxiflora Lojac. – Linosa, Lampedusa, and Malta
- Plantago afra subsp. zwierleinii (Nicotra) Brullo
- Plantago peloritana Lojac.

== Plumbaginaceae ==
- Armeria nebrodensis (Guss.) Boiss.
- Limonium aegusae Brullo
- Limonium albidum (Guss.) Pignatti – Pelagian Islands
- Limonium algusae (Brullo) Greuter
- Limonium bocconei (Lojac.) Litard – northwestern Sicily and Aegadian Islands
- Limonium calcarae (Tod. ex Janka) Pignatti – central Sicily (near Caltanissetta)
- †Limonium catanense (Tineo ex Lojac.) Brullo – Sicily (maritime cliffs near Catania); last recorded in 1900
- Limonium catanzaroi Brullo
- Limonium cophanense C.Brullo, Brullo, Cambria, Giusso & Ilardi
- Limonium cosyrense (Guss.) Kuntze – Pantelleria
- Limonium densiflorum (Guss.) Kuntze – western Sicily
- Limonium flagellare (Lojac.) Brullo
- Limonium furnarii Brullo
- Limonium halophilum Pignatti – southern Sicily
- Limonium hyblaeum Brullo
- †Limonium intermedium (Guss.) Brullo – Lampedusa
- Limonium jankae (Lojac.) Giardina & Raimondo
- Limonium lanfrancoi Agius, M.E.Galea, Cambria, Giusso & Brullo – Malta
- Limonium lilybaeum Brullo
- Limonium lojaconoi Brullo
- Limonium lopadusanum Brullo – Lampedusa
- Limonium mazarae Pignatti ex Brullo
- Limonium melancholicum Brullo, Marcenò & S.Romano
- Limonium melitense Brullo – Malta
- Limonium minutiflorum (Guss.) Kuntze
- Limonium optimae Raimondo
- Limonium opulentum (Lojac.) Brullo
- Limonium pachynense Brullo
- Limonium panormitanum (Tod.) Pignatti – northwestern Sicily (near Palermo)
- Limonium parvifolium (Tineo) Pignatti Sicily (Pantelleria)
- Limonium pavonianum Brullo western and southern Sicily
- Limonium ponzoi (Fiori & Bég.) Brullo – western Sicily
- Limonium secundirameum (Lojac.) Brullo – Pantelleria
- Limonium selinuntinum Brullo
- Limonium sibthorpianum (Guss.) Kuntze – northeastern Sicily
- Limonium syracusanum Brullo
- Limonium tauromenitanum Brullo
- Limonium tenuiculum (Tineo ex Guss.) Pignatti Sicily (Marettimo I.)
- Limonium tineoi Giardina & Raimondo – southeastern Sicily
- Limonium todaroanum Raimondo & Pignatti
- Limonium usticanum Giardina & Raimondo – Ustica I.
- Limonium zeraphae Brullo – Malta incl. Gozo and Comino

== Poaceae ==
- Avena saxatilis (Lojac.) Rocha Afonso – Sicily (I. Lipari, Marettimo, Limosa)
- Festuca morisiana subsp. sicula Cristaudo, Foggi, Galesi & Maugeri
- Stipa sicula Moraldo, la Valva, Ricciardi & Caputo – Sicily (Madonie Mountains)

== Polygalaceae ==
- Polygala preslii Spreng.

== Polypodiaceae ==
- Polypodium vulgare subsp. melitense Peroni – Malta

== Portulacaceae ==
- Portulaca sicula Danin, Domina & Raimondo

== Primulaceae ==
- Cyclamen brulloi Cambria, Giusso, Miniss., Tavilla & Salmeri

== Ranunculaceae ==
- Delphinium emarginatum subsp. emarginatum – western Sicily
- Ranunculus angulatus C.Presl
- †Ranunculus bulbosus f. macranthus (Sommier & Caruana) Lanfr. – Malta

== Rhamnaceae ==
- Rhamnus lojaconoi Raimondo

== Rosaceae ==
- Aria busambarensis (G.Castellano, P.Marino, Raimondo & Spadaro) Sennikov & Kurtto – northern Sicily
- Aria madoniensis (Raimondo, G.Castellano, Bazan & Schicchi) Sennikov & Kurtto – northern Sicily
- Aria meridionalis (Guss. ex Tod.) Raimondo & Greuter
- Aria phitosiana Raimondo & Greuter – northeastern Sicily
- Malus crescimannoi Raimondo – northeastern Sicily
- Prunus mahaleb subsp. cupaniana (Guss.) Arcang. – northern Sicily
- Pyrus castribonensis Raimondo, Schicchi & Mazzola – northern and north-central Sicily
- Pyrus ciancioi P.Marino, G.Castellano, Raimondo & Spadaro – northern Sicily
- Pyrus pedrottiana Raimondo, Venturella & Domina – Sicily (Nebrodi Mountains)
- Pyrus sicanorum Raimondo, Schicchi & P.Marino – central Sicily
- Pyrus vallis-demonis Raimondo & Schicchi – northeastern Sicily
- Rubus aetnensis C.Presl
- Rubus cupanianus Guss.

== Rubiaceae ==
- Cynanchica gussonei (Boiss.) P.Caputo & Del Guacchio – northern Sicily (Madonie Mountains)
- Cynanchica peloritana (C.Brullo, Brullo, Giusso & Scuderi) P.Caputo & Del Guacchio – northeastern Sicily
- Galium litorale Guss. – western Sicily
- Hexaphylla rupestris (Tineo) P.Caputo & Del Guacchio – northwestern and southeastern Sicily and Aegadian Islands
- Valantia calva Brullo – Linosa
- Valantia deltoidea Brullo – northern Sicily (Rocca Busambra)
- Valantia muralis var. intricata (Lojac.) Brullo

== Salicaceae ==
- Salix gussonei Brullo & G.Spamp. – northeastern Sicily

== Ulmaceae ==
- Zelkova sicula Di Pasq., Garfi & Quézel – southeastern Sicily

== Urticaceae ==
- Urtica rupestris Guss.

== Violaceae ==
- Viola aethnensis subsp. aethnensis – Sicily (Mount Etna)
- Viola nebrodensis C.Presl – northern Sicily
- Viola tineorum Erben & Raimondo – northern Sicily
- Viola ucriana Erben & Raimondo – northern Sicily
