= South Apennine mixed montane forests =

Ecoregion in Italy

South Apeninne mixed montane forests
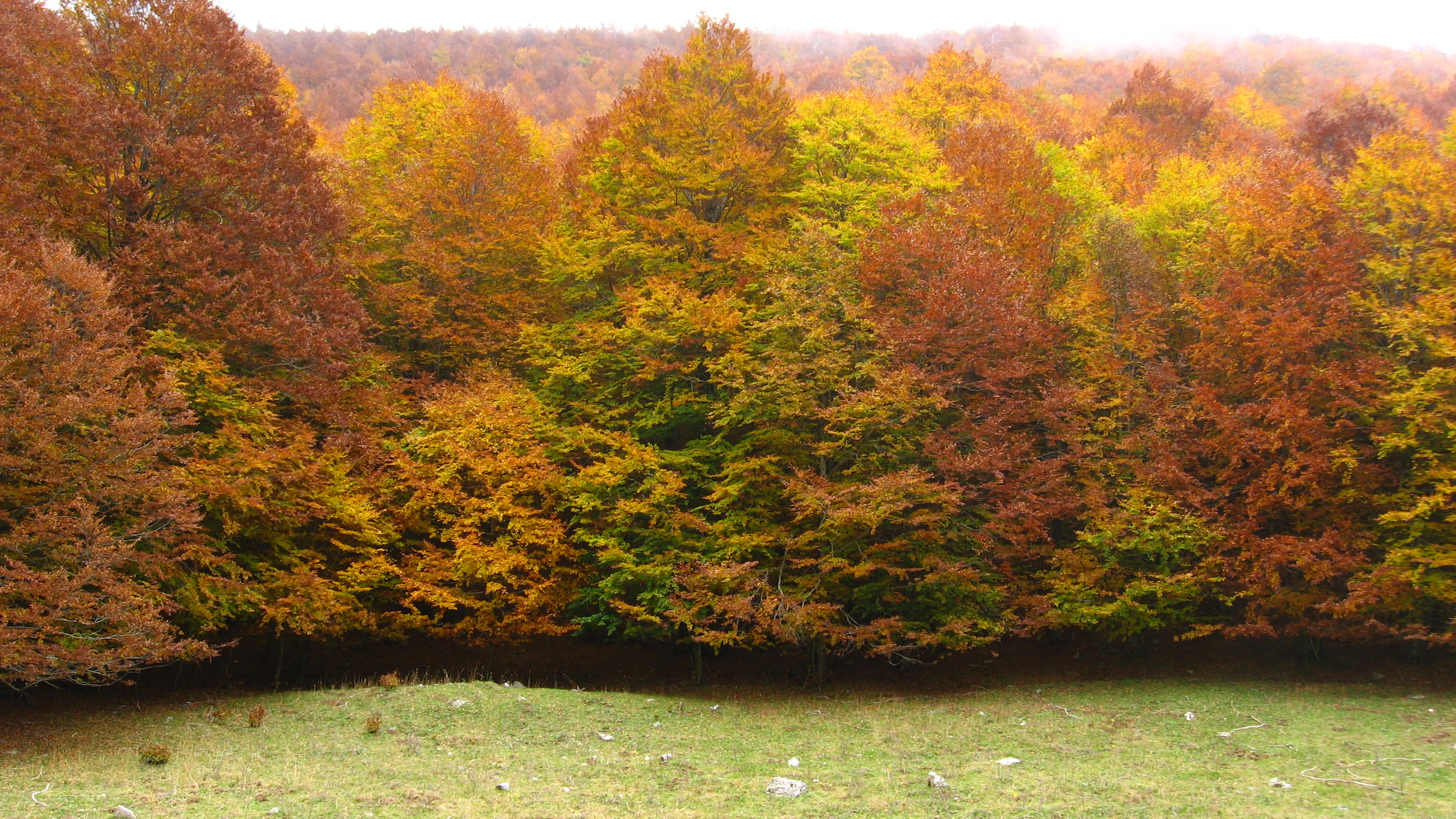
- Beech forest in Pollino National Park

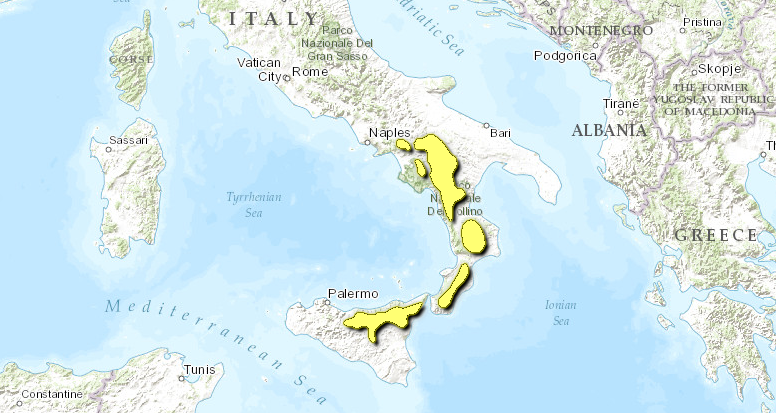
- Map of the ecoregion

Ecology
- Realm: Palearctic
- Biome: Mediterranean forests, woodlands, and scrub
- Borders: Italian sclerophyllous and semi-deciduous forests; Tyrrhenian-Adriatic sclerophyllous and mixed forests

Geography
- Area: 13,095 km^{2} (5,056 mi^{2})
- Country: Italy
- Regions: Basilicata; Calabria; Campania, Sicily

Conservation
- Conservation status: vulnerable
- Protected: 6,008 km^{2} (46%)

The South Apennine mixed montane forests is an ecoregion in the southern Apennine Mountains of southern Italy and Sicily. It has a Mediterranean climate, and is in the Mediterranean forests, woodlands, and scrub biome.

This ecoregion is restricted to the high mountain massifs of the regions of Basilicata, Calabria and the island of Sicily.

== Climate ==
The climate of the ecoregion changes with elevation. The lower mountain slopes have a warm and sub-humid climate, with an average annual temperature of 14 to 17 °C. High elevations are cooler and more humid, with annual average temperatures of 9 to 13 °C and over 2000 mm of precipitation annually. The mountain summits in southern Calabria and northeastern Sicily are frequently covered in dense fog. Winters at high elevation are cold, with abundant snowfall.

== Flora ==
The ecoregion's wide elevational range results in several forest zones.

=== Lowest elevations ===
At lowest elevations the forests are characterized by the sclerophyllous evergreen holm oak (Quercus ilex) and cork oak (Quercus suber), coniferous stone pine (Pinus pinea), and the deciduous trees Quercus pubescens, Fraxinus ornus, and Ostrya carpinifolia. The Sicilian endemic deciduous oak Quercus gussonei is native to the mountains of northern Sicily from 700 to 1000 meters elevation.

=== Medium elevations ===
At medium elevations the mixed deciduous forests of Quercus cerris, Quercus pubescens, Quercus frainetto, sweet chestnut (Castanea sativa), and Ostrya carpinifolia predominate.

=== High elevations ===
At high elevations there is a north–south slopes gradient of plant communities:

- South-facing plant communities: On south-facing slopes with cold and dry climate European black pine (Pinus nigra subsp. larico) is the dominant species. Pinus nigra subsp. larico is also found on Mount Etna up to the timberline along with the Etna birch (Betula aetniensis). Pinus heldreichii leucodermis is found only Pollino Mountains.
- North-facing plant communities: On north-facing slopes Silver fir (Abies alba) and European beech (Fagus sylvatica) mix with Pinus nigra subsp. larico. Relict stands of the endemic Nebrodi fir (Abies nebrodensis) appear in the Madonie Mountains. The Etna summits is characterized by a shrub community of Astragalus siculus, Berberis aetnensis, Juniperus communis alpina and the Etna tree-broom (Genista aetnensis).

== Fauna ==
Large mammals include roe deer (Capreolus capreolus), European wildcat (Felis silvestris), and crested porcupine (Hystrix cristata). The Italian wolf (Canis lupus italicus) lives in the peninsular portion of the ecoregion, and Sila and Pollino national parks are home to Italy's largest wolf population. Wolves are absent from Sicily.

Sicily's forests are home to the Sicilian shrew (Crocidura sicula), which is endemic to Sicily and Malta.

== Protected areas ==
A 2017 assessment found that 6,008 km^{2}, or 46%, of the ecoregion is in protected areas. Protected areas include Aspromonte National Park, Sila National Park, and Pollino National Park, Appennino Lucano - Val d'Agri - Lagonegrese National Park, and Monti Picentini Regional Park, Nebrodi Park, and Etna Park.
