= Bonannia =

Scientific classification
- Kingdom: Plantae
- Clade: Tracheophytes
- Clade: Angiosperms
- Clade: Eudicots
- Clade: Asterids
- Order: Apiales
- Family: Apiaceae
- Subfamily: Apioideae
- Genus: Bonannia; Guss.
- Species: B. graeca

Binomial name
- Bonannia graeca (L.) Halácsy

Synonyms
- Cicuta graeca (L.) Crantz; Foeniculum graecum (L.) Calest.; Sium graecum L.; Bonannia nudicaulis (Spreng.) Rickett & Stafleu; Bonannia resinifera Guss., nom. superfl.; Bonannia resinosa Strobl; Cicuta resinifera (Guss.) M.Hiroe; Ferula nudicaulis Spreng., nom. illeg.; Laserpitium resinosum C.Presl; Ligusticum resinosum; Guss. Meum resinosum; Baill. Sium graecum; Guss. ex Spreng., not validly publ.

Genus of flowering plants

Bonannia is a monotypic genus of flowering plant in the family Apiaceae. Its only species is Bonannia graeca. It is endemic to southern Europe (southern mainland Italy, Sicily and southern Greece).
