= Allium aeginiense =

Scientific classification
- Kingdom: Plantae
- Clade: Tracheophytes
- Clade: Angiosperms
- Clade: Monocots
- Order: Asparagales
- Family: Amaryllidaceae
- Subfamily: Allioideae
- Genus: Allium
- Species: A. aeginiense

Binomial name
- Allium aeginiense Brullo, Giusso & Terrasi

Species of flowering plant

Allium aeginiense is a plant species endemic to Greece. It is known only from the area near Meteora in the Thessaly region.

Allium aeginiense produces an egg-shaped bulb up to 25 mm across. Leaves are flat, green, very narrow, up to 10 cm long but rarely more than 1.5 mm wide, covered with hairs up to 2 mm long. Scape is round in cross-section, up to 20 cm tall, hairless, bearing an umbel of up to 40 flowers. Flowers are bell-shaped, pinkish-purple, with yellow anthers and a green ovary.
