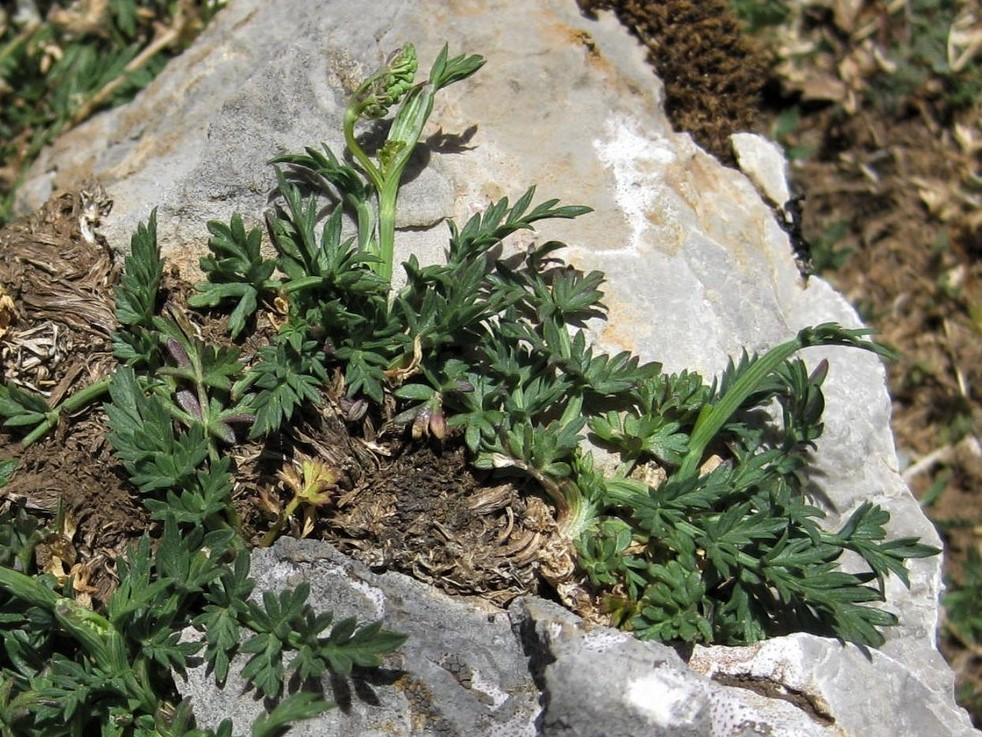

Scientific classification
- Kingdom: Plantae
- Clade: Tracheophytes
- Clade: Angiosperms
- Clade: Eudicots
- Clade: Asterids
- Order: Apiales
- Family: Apiaceae
- Subfamily: Apioideae
- Tribe: Selineae
- Genus: Siculosciadium; C.Brullo, Brullo, S.R.Downie & Giusso
- Species: S. nebrodense

Binomial name
- Siculosciadium nebrodense (Guss.) C.Brullo, Brullo, S.R.Downie & Giusso

Synonyms
- List: Dichoropetalum nebrodense (Guss.) Soldano, Galasso & Banfi; Holandrea nebrodensis (Guss.) Banfi, Galasso & Soldano; Peucedanum carvifolium var. nebrodense (Guss.) Paol.; Peucedanum nebrodense (Guss.) Nyman; Pteroselinum nebrodense Guss.

= Siculosciadium =

Genus of flowering plants

Siculosciadium is a genus of flowering plants in the carrot family Apiaceae. It is monotypic, being represented by the single species Siculosciadium nebrodense, which grows as a perennial subshrub endemic to the Madonie massif of Sicily. It is the sole species in .

The species was first described as Pteroselinum nebrodense by Giovanni Gussone in 1843. In 2013 it was placed in its own genus as Siculosciadium nebrodense.
