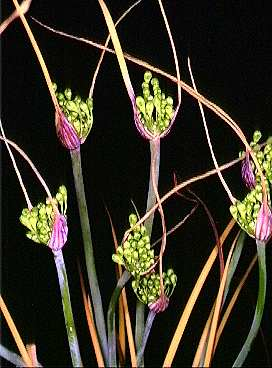

Conservation status
- Least Concern (IUCN 3.1)

Scientific classification
- Kingdom: Plantae
- Clade: Tracheophytes
- Clade: Angiosperms
- Clade: Monocots
- Order: Asparagales
- Family: Amaryllidaceae
- Subfamily: Allioideae
- Genus: Allium
- Species: A. nebrodense

Binomial name
- Allium nebrodense Guss.

Synonyms
- Allium flavum subsp. nebrodense (Guss.) Nyman; Allium flavum var. nebrodense (Guss.) Regel

= Allium nebrodense =

Species of flowering plant

Allium nebrodense is a rare Italian species of wild onion. It is found only in the Madonie mountains on the Island of Sicily in southern Italy.

Allium nebrodense is unusual in the genus is that the scape is not erect but rather ascending (horizontal in the lower part, then curving upwards). Spathes are also unusual in their conspicuousness, narrowing to a pair of long red claws on either side of the umbel, much longer than the umbel itself. The flowers themselves are yellow.
