= Helichrysum panormitanum =

Scientific classification
- Kingdom: Plantae
- Clade: Tracheophytes
- Clade: Angiosperms
- Clade: Eudicots
- Clade: Asterids
- Order: Asterales
- Family: Asteraceae
- Genus: Helichrysum
- Species: H. panormitanum

Binomial name
- Helichrysum panormitanum Guss.

Synonyms
- Of the species: Helichrysum pendulum subsp. rupicola (Maire) M.B.Crespo & Mateo; Helichrysum stoechas subsp. rupicola Maire

Species of plant

Helichrysum panormitanum is a species of flowering plant in the family Asteraceae, native to Sicily and Malta. It was first described by Giovanni Gussone in 1844.

== Subspecies ==
As of April 2023, Plants of the World Online accepted three subspecies:

- Helichrysum panormitanum subsp. brulloi Iamonico & Pignatti
- Helichrysum panormitanum subsp. melitense (Pignatti) Iamonico & Pignatti – endemic to Malta
- Helichrysum panormitanum subsp. panormitanum, synonyms including Helichrysum rupestre DC., nom. superfl. – endemic to Sicily
