= Allium agrigentinum =

Agrigento garlic

Scientific classification
- Kingdom: Plantae
- Clade: Tracheophytes
- Clade: Angiosperms
- Clade: Monocots
- Order: Asparagales
- Family: Amaryllidaceae
- Subfamily: Allioideae
- Genus: Allium
- Subgenus: A. subg. Allium
- Species: A. agrigentinum

Binomial name
- Allium agrigentinum Brullo & Pavone

Species of flowering plant

Allium agrigentinum is a plant species in the Amaryllis family, endemic to the Italian Island of Sicily in the Mediterranean. Initial collections were made in or near the Riserva naturale integrale Macalube di Aragona Wildlife Sanctuary.

Allium agrigentinum has a light brown bulb up to 20 mm long. Scape is up to 40 cm tall. The umbel is hemispherical with uneven pedicels. Flowers are narrowly bell-shaped with pinkish-purple tepals.
