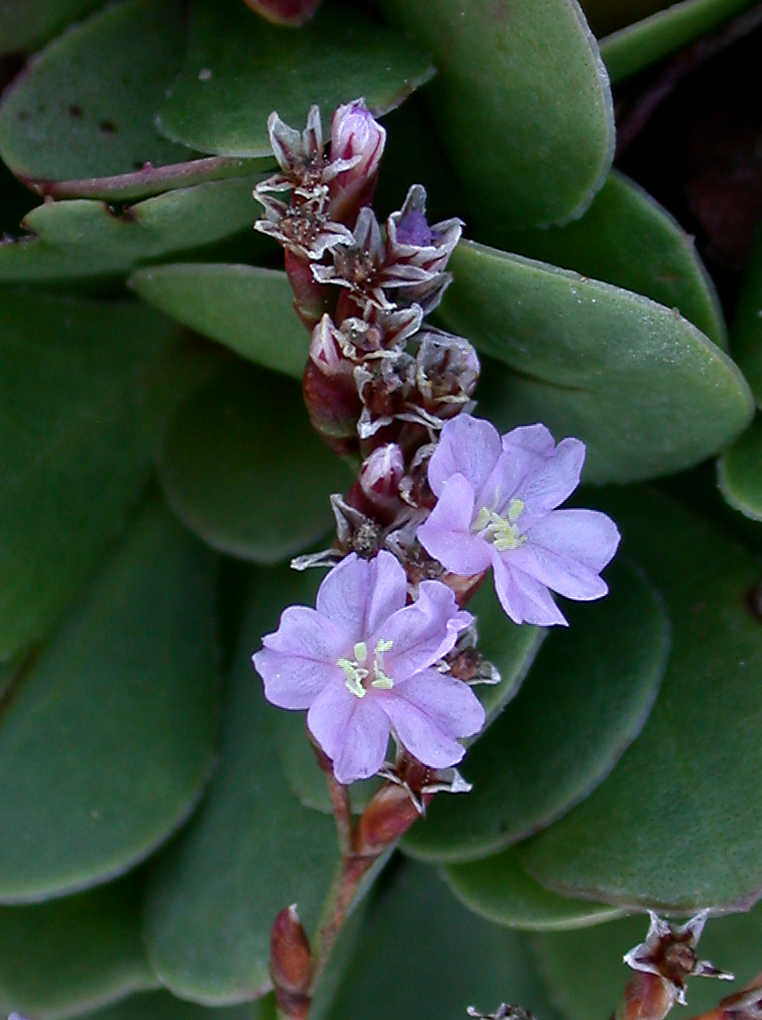
- Flowers

Scientific classification
- Kingdom: Plantae
- Clade: Tracheophytes
- Clade: Angiosperms
- Clade: Eudicots
- Order: Caryophyllales
- Family: Plumbaginaceae
- Genus: Limonium
- Species: L. hyblaeum

Binomial name
- Limonium hyblaeum Brullo

= Limonium hyblaeum =

Species of plant

Limonium hyblaeum, the Sicilian sea lavender or Rottingdean sea-lavender, is a species of flowering plant in the family Plumbaginaceae, native to Sicily. A cushion-forming perennial, it is an incipient invasive in Australian coastal areas.
