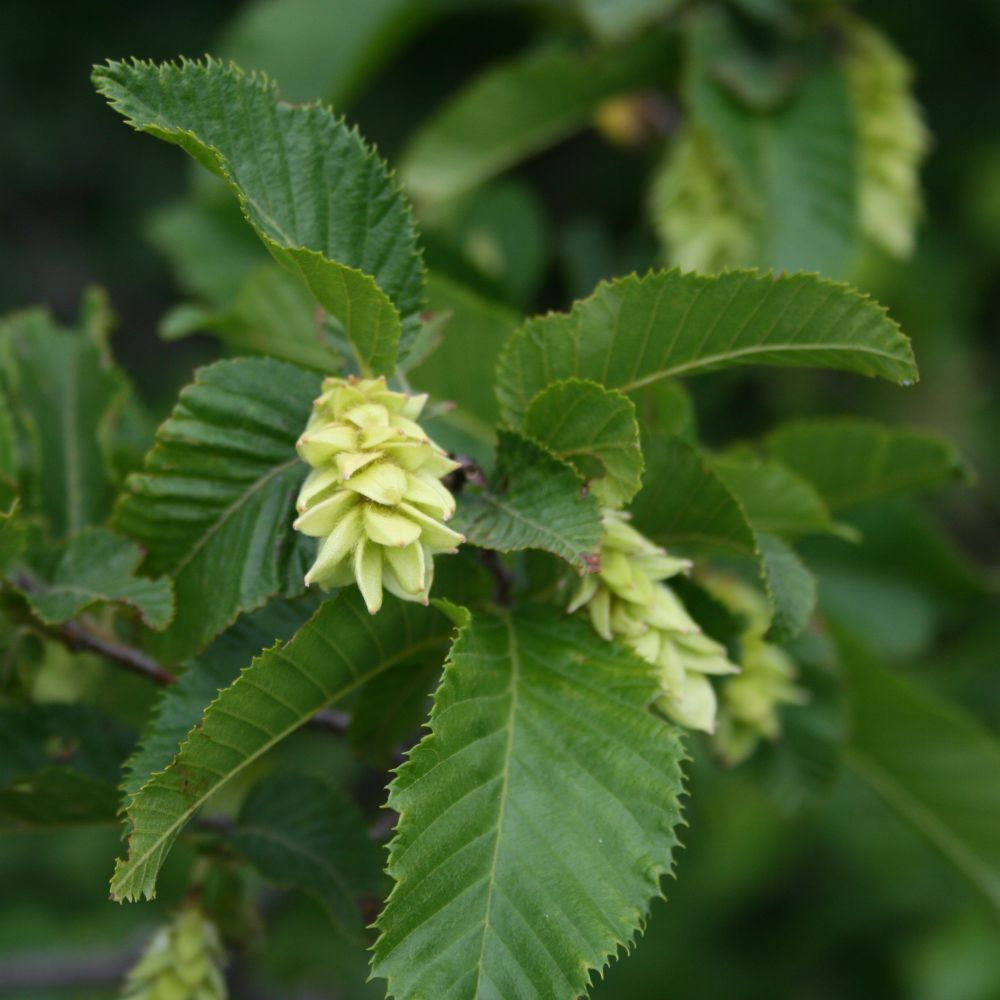

Conservation status
- Least Concern (IUCN 3.1)

Scientific classification
- Kingdom: Plantae
- Clade: Tracheophytes
- Clade: Angiosperms
- Clade: Eudicots
- Clade: Rosids
- Order: Fagales
- Family: Betulaceae
- Genus: Ostrya
- Species: O. carpinifolia

Binomial name
- Ostrya carpinifolia Scop.
- Native range

Synonyms
- Carpinus italica Scop. ex Steud., pro syn.; Carpinus ostrya L.; Ostrya carpinifolia var. genuina Fliche, not validly publ.; Ostrya italica P.Micheli ex Spach, nom. illeg. superfl.; Ostrya italica subsp. carpinifolia (Scop.) H.J.P.Winkl., nom. illeg. homonym. post.; Ostrya ladelcii Sanguin.; Ostrya virginiana subsp. carpinifolia (Scop.) Briq.; Ostrya vulgaris Willd., nom. illeg. superfl.

= Ostrya carpinifolia =

European hop-hornbeam

Species of tree

Ostrya carpinifolia, the European hop-hornbeam, is a tree in the family Betulaceae. It is the only species of the genus Ostrya that is native to Europe.

The specific epithet carpinifolia means "hornbeam-leaved", from carpinus, the Latin word for "hornbeam".

== Common name ==
The name hophornbeam is derived from hops, in reference to the shape of the tree's fruit, and the related hornbeam tree.

== Description ==
Ostrya carpinifolia is a broadleaf deciduous tree, that can reach up to 21 metres (69 ft). It has a conical or irregular crown and a scaly, rough bark, and alternate and double-toothed birch-like leaves 3–10 cm long. The leaves are many-veined with 11-15 pairs and have a slightly hairy or smooth underside.

The flowers are produced in spring, with male catkins 5–10 cm (2–4 in) long and female catkins 2–5 cm (3/4–2 in) long. The fruit form in pendulous clusters 3–8 cm (1 1/4–3 1/4 in) long with 6–20 seeds; each seed is a small nut 2–4 mm (1/16–3/16 in) long, fully enclosed in a bladder-like involucre.

== Distribution and habitat ==
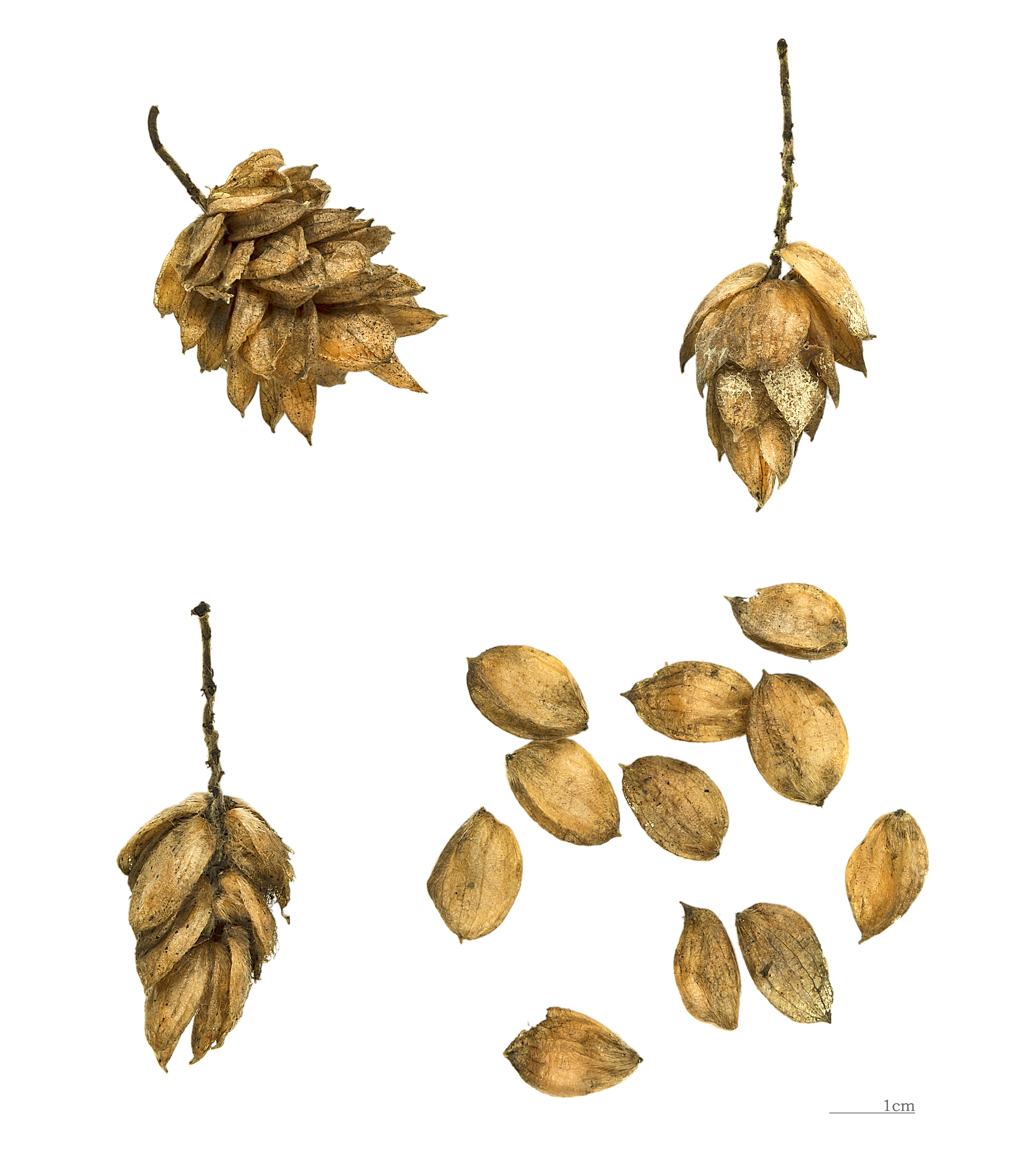
Fruits of Ostrya carpinifolia – MHNT

Ostrya carpinifolia is found in Lebanon, Italy, France, Austria, Slovenia, Albania, Croatia, Bosnia and Herzegovina, Serbia, Montenegro, North Macedonia, Greece, Bulgaria, southern Switzerland and Turkey. It has been cultivated in England since before 1724.

In southern Italy and Sicily is found at medium elevations in the South Apennine mixed montane forests ecoregion.

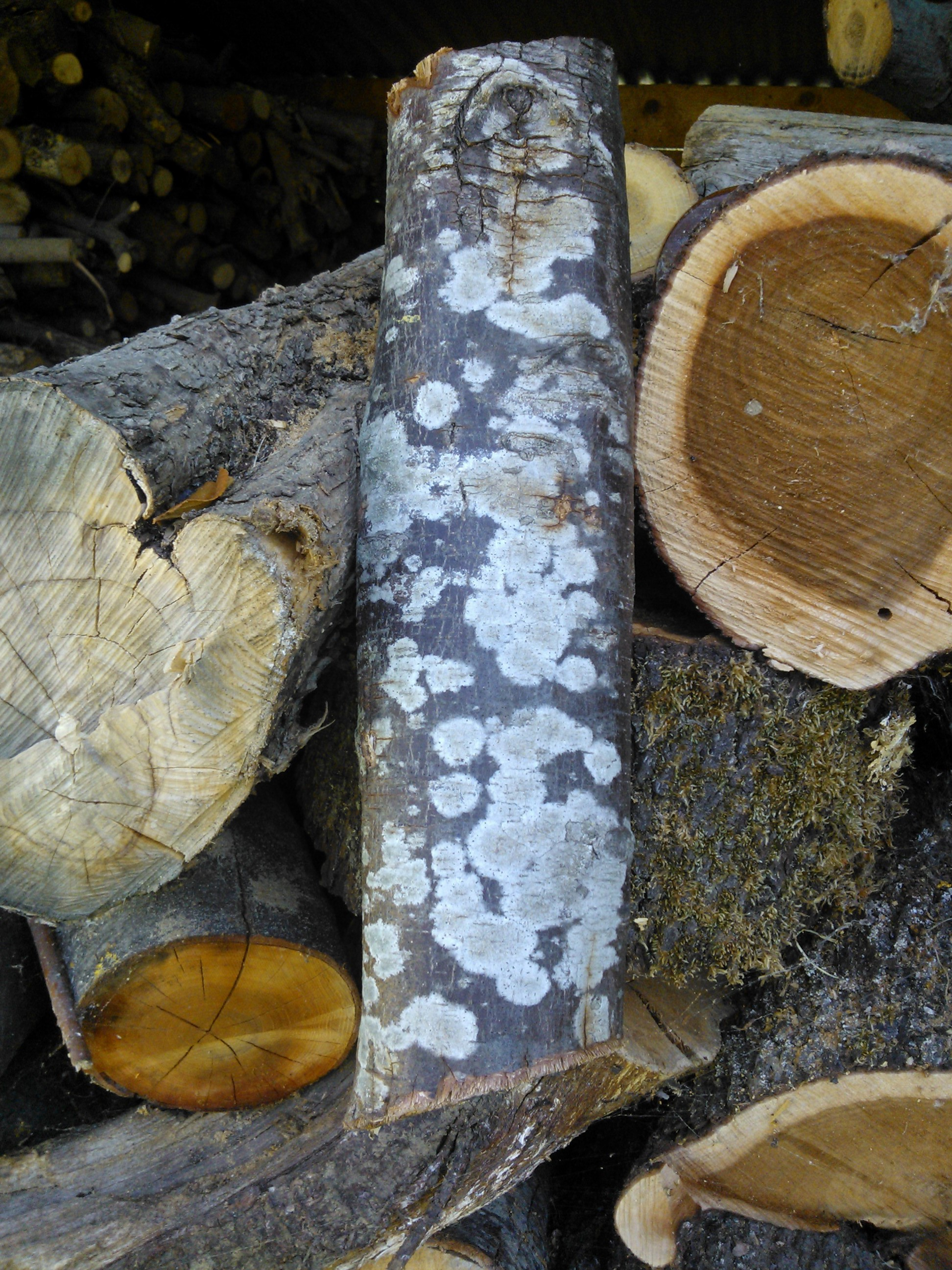
The wood of Ostrya carpinifolia

== Uses ==
The wood is very heavy and hard, and was historically used to fashion plane soles. Other uses have included in the manufacture of wooden cogs and gears.

Ostrya are used as food plants by the larvae of some Lepidoptera species.
