= Urtica rupestris =

Scientific classification
- Kingdom: Plantae
- Clade: Tracheophytes
- Clade: Angiosperms
- Clade: Eudicots
- Clade: Rosids
- Order: Rosales
- Family: Urticaceae
- Genus: Urtica
- Species: U. rupestris

Binomial name
- Urtica rupestris Guss.

Species of plant

Urtica rupestris is a species of plant in the family Urticaceae, endemic to Sicily. The leaves may be conspicuously hit by the rust Puccinia urticatata.
