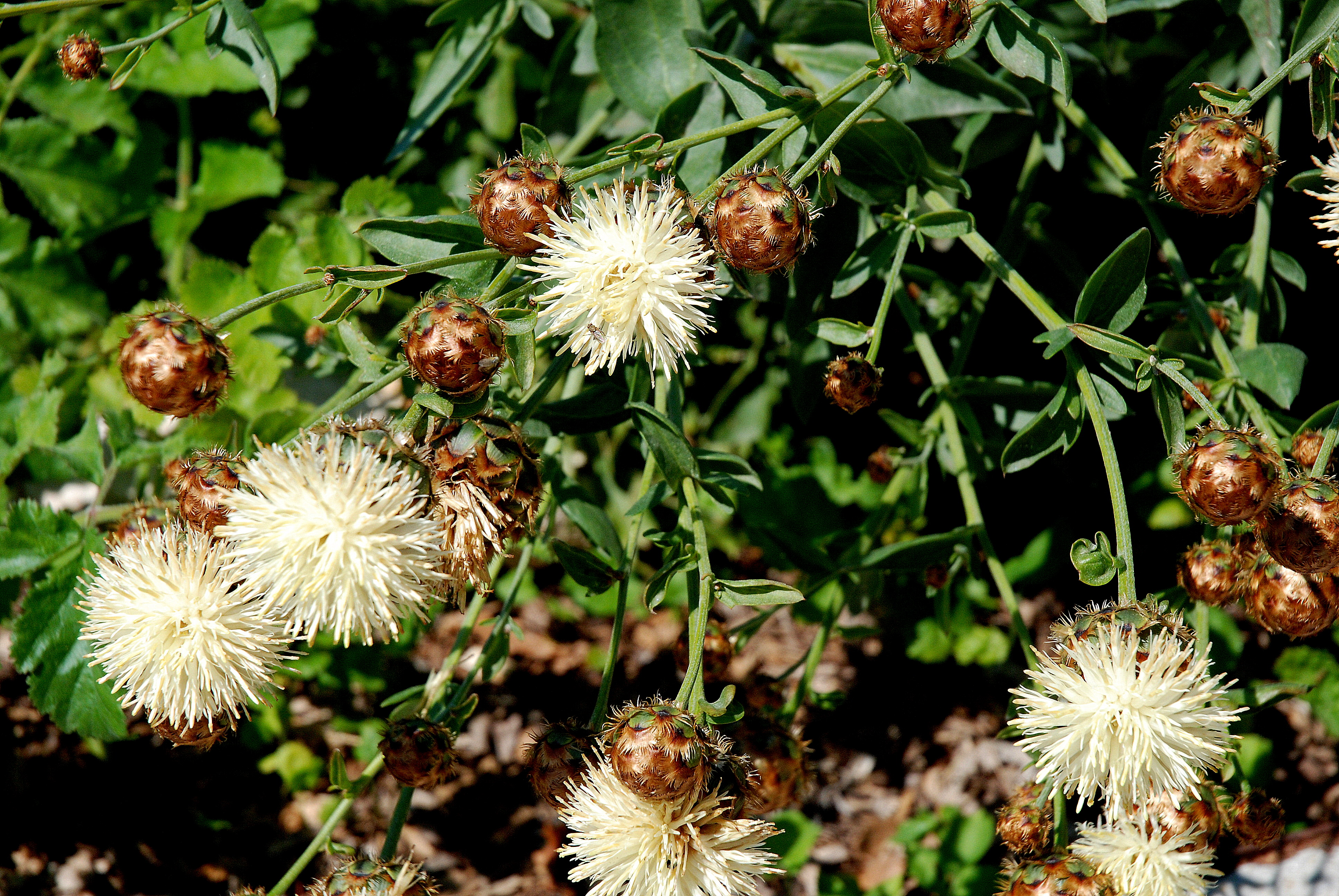

Scientific classification
- Kingdom: Plantae
- Clade: Tracheophytes
- Clade: Angiosperms
- Clade: Eudicots
- Clade: Asterids
- Order: Asterales
- Family: Asteraceae
- Genus: Centaurea
- Species: C. tauromenitana

Binomial name
- Centaurea tauromenitana Guss.

= Centaurea tauromenitana =

Species of flowering plant

Centaurea tauromenitana is a species of thistle in the family Asteraceae. It is endemic to Sicily.
