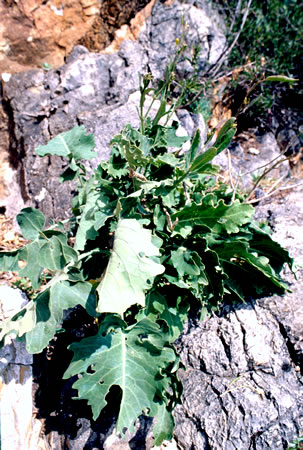

Conservation status
- Critically Endangered (IUCN 2.3)

Scientific classification
- Kingdom: Plantae
- Clade: Embryophytes
- Clade: Tracheophytes
- Clade: Spermatophytes
- Clade: Angiosperms
- Clade: Eudicots
- Clade: Rosids
- Order: Brassicales
- Family: Brassicaceae
- Genus: Brassica
- Species: B. macrocarpa

Binomial name
- Brassica macrocarpa Guss.

Synonyms
- Brassica macrocarpa f. glabra Lojac.; Brassica macrocarpa var. villosissima Damanti ex O.E.Schulz; Brassica macrocarpa f. villosoincana Lojac.; Eruca macrocapa (Guss.) Caruel

= Brassica macrocarpa =

Species of plant

Brassica macrocarpa is a species of Brassica found in Sicily. It is a subshrub endemic to the Egadi Archipelago off Sicily's western coast.
