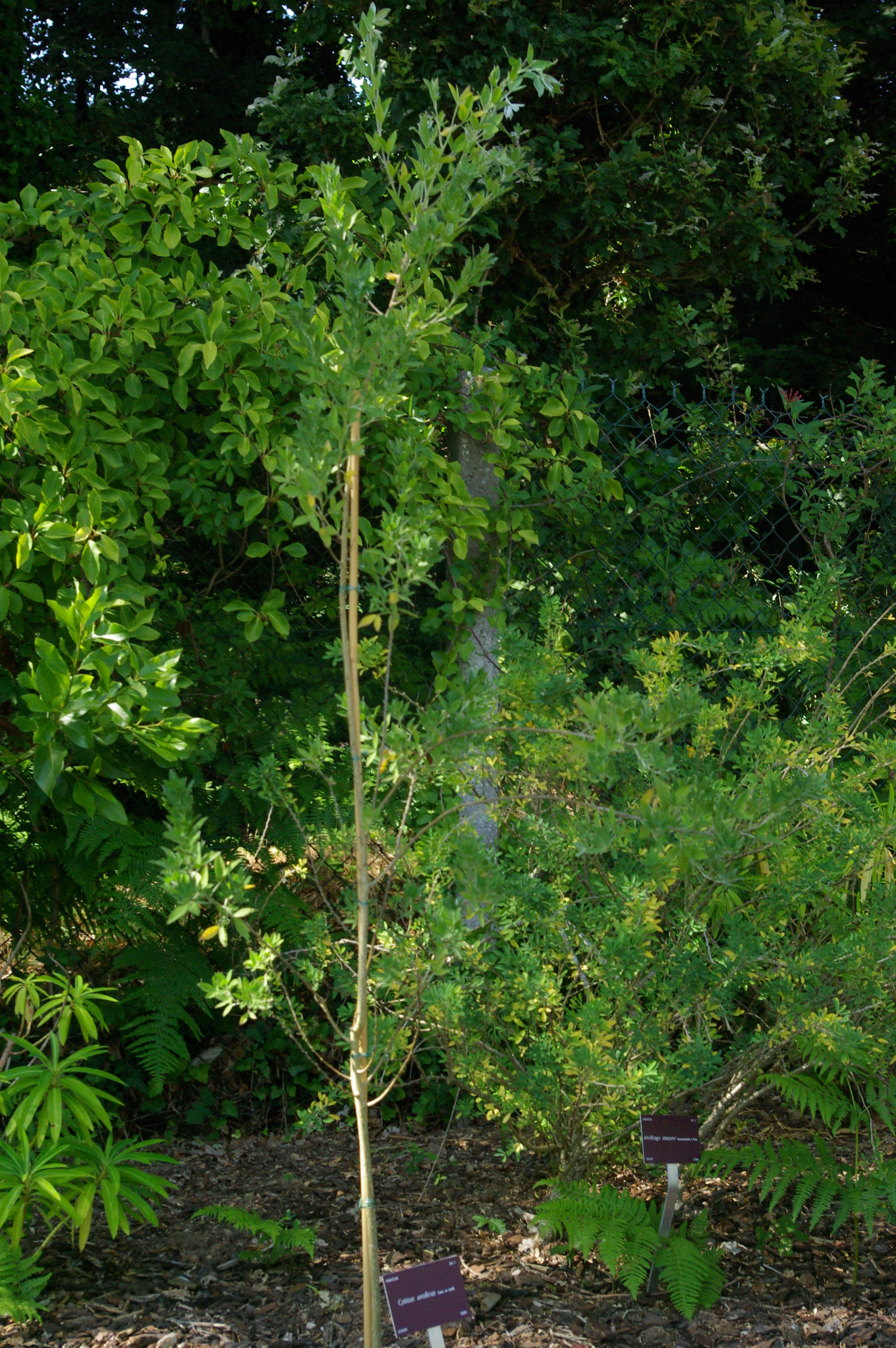
- At the Conservatoire botanique national de Brest
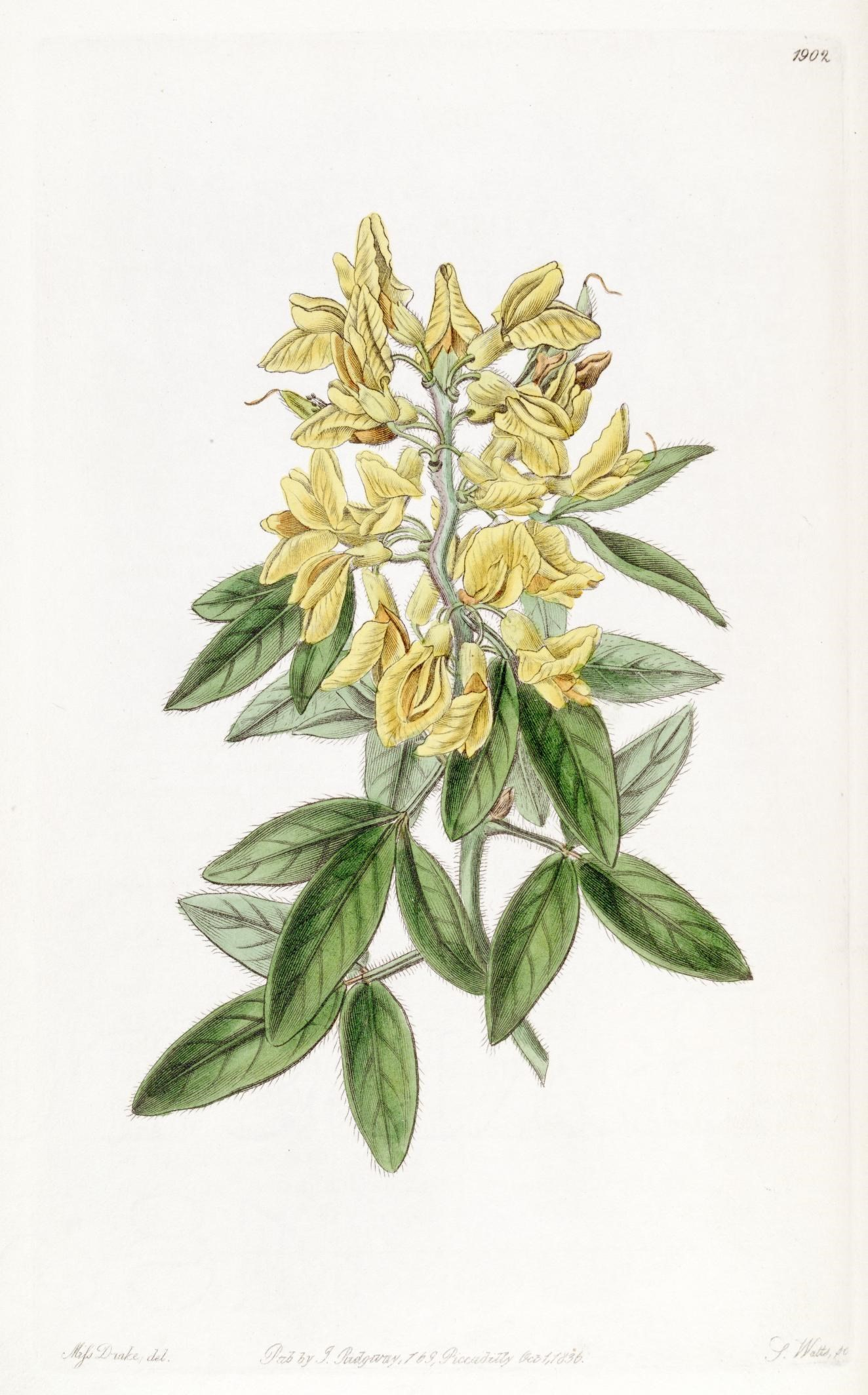
- Botanical illustration

Conservation status
- Endangered (IUCN 3.1)

Scientific classification
- Kingdom: Plantae
- Clade: Tracheophytes
- Clade: Angiosperms
- Clade: Eudicots
- Clade: Rosids
- Order: Fabales
- Family: Fabaceae
- Subfamily: Faboideae
- Genus: Cytisus
- Species: C. aeolicus

Binomial name
- Cytisus aeolicus Guss.

Synonyms
- Cytisus bartolottae Tod.; Meiemianthera aeolica Raf.

= Cytisus aeolicus =

Species of plant

Cytisus aeolicus, the Aeolian broom, is a species of flowering plant in the family Fabaceae. It is native to three of the Aeolian Islands; Vulcano, Lipari, and Stromboli. Assessed as Endangered (previously Critically Endangered), it is a shrub or small tree, found in shrublands, garrigues, and disturbed soils.

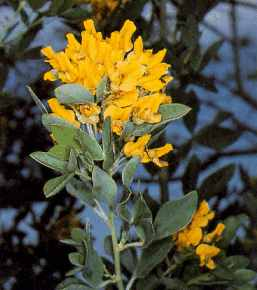
Inflorescence
