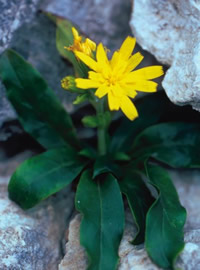

Conservation status
- Critically Endangered (IUCN 3.1)

Scientific classification
- Kingdom: Plantae
- Clade: Tracheophytes
- Clade: Angiosperms
- Clade: Eudicots
- Clade: Asterids
- Order: Asterales
- Family: Asteraceae
- Genus: Hieracium
- Species: H. lucidum

Binomial name
- Hieracium lucidum Guss.

= Hieracium lucidum =

Species of flowering plant

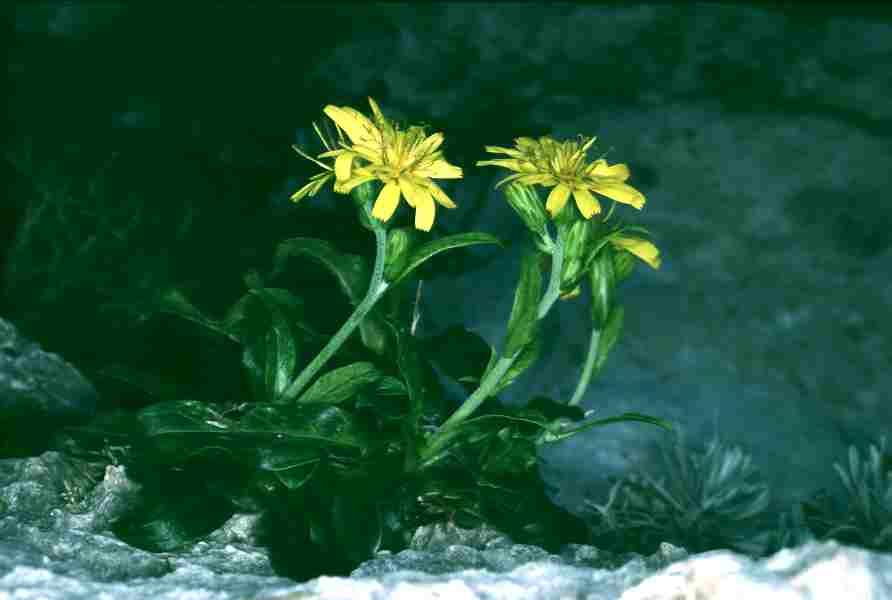

Hieracium lucidum, or Sicilian sparviere, is a flowering plant in the family Asteraceae. It is very similar to Hieracium cophanense. Hieracium lucidum is a perennial herb that prefers the northern slopes of chalky seaside cliffs exposed to wet winds, including sites rich in nitrates from sea bird droppings. Unlike most other hawkweeds, this species reproduces only from seeds.

== Distribution ==
Hieracium lucidum is found only in Sicily; its range is limited to Mt. Gallo, near Palermo. Due to the extremely limited area in which it is found, which is estimated to be 0.2 km^{2} (0.1 sq mi), the species is listed by the IUCN Red List as critically endangered.

Its natural habitats are Mediterranean-type shrubby vegetation and rocky shores.
