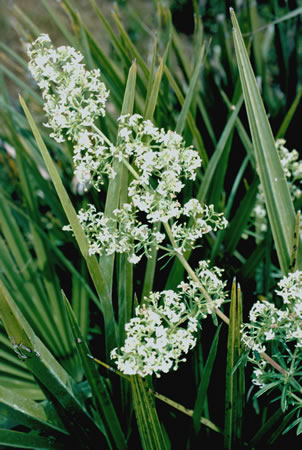
- inflorescence of Galium litorale

Conservation status
- Near Threatened (IUCN 3.1)

Scientific classification
- Kingdom: Plantae
- Clade: Tracheophytes
- Clade: Angiosperms
- Clade: Eudicots
- Clade: Asterids
- Order: Gentianales
- Family: Rubiaceae
- Genus: Galium
- Species: G. litorale

Binomial name
- Galium litorale Guss.

= Galium litorale =

Species of flowering plant

Galium litorale is a rare species of bedstraw in the Rubiaceae family. It is endemic to the island of Sicily in the Mediterranean Sea. In Italian it is known as caglio costiero.

== Taxonomy ==
This species was first described in 1827 by Giovanni Gussone in the first part of his Florae Siculae Prodromus.

== Description ==
Galium litorale is a perennial herb, from 20 to 60 cm in height. G. litorale characteristically has a stoloniferous habitus. It is considered a hemicryptophyte or chamaephyte (a subshrub). The upper stems are pubescent, with short internodes. The leaves are narrowly oblanceolate in shape, 2-5 x 10–18 mm, abruptly pointed and somewhat rough in texture at their edges.

The inflorescence is erect and consists of a large, elongated panicle of many small white flowers. It has short, lateral branches. The peduncles are 1.5–3 mm, divaricating after each flower. The flowers have a white, pubescent corolla with a diameter of 3–4 mm and with apiculate lobes. The fruit has a diameter of 2–3 mm, and is dark or blackish coloured when ripe.

It appears to be most closely related to Galium species from North Africa, in particular G. poirelianum.

== Distribution ==
It is endemic to western Sicily, a large island belonging to Italy. Here it can be found between Marsala and Mazara del Vallo, near the coast in the far southwest of the island, at the closest point of the island to Tunisia in Africa. The total area of occupancy consisted of some 500 km^{2} of habitat.

== Ecology ==
It grows in the habitat coded as '5330' in the system used by the European Commission, which stands for "thermo-Mediterranean and pre-desert scrub". The preferred habitats have also been described as macchia, garrigue and grasslands. It grows in beach sands. It grows from sea level to 100 metres.

It appears to have a special relationship with the small and spiny palm species Chamaerops humilis, very often growing in the shelter of the spines, in an area of coastal garrigue where the palm is particularly common.

It blooms from June or July to September.

== Conservation ==
In 1992 Galium litorale was designated as a 'priority species' under Annex II of the Habitats Directive of the European Community (which was reformed as the European Union the following year). This designation was meant to serve as the basis for Italy to declare which areas in which it occurs are 'Special Areas of Conservation' -which were to form the backbone of the Natura 2000 network, but only if these areas include one of the number of habitats listed in Annex I of the directive (such as seashores). The total number of plants was estimated by the Commission of the European Communities in 2009 to be at less than a thousand individuals according to the IUCN. The species was listed as 'near threatened' by the IUCN in 2011. The species was assessed for the second time by the Government of Italy in 2013 in light of Article 17 of the Habitats Directive (a report every six years), and it was given the conservation status of 'U1': "unfavourable-inadequate", as in 2007. It was assessed again in 2019, and after "improved knowledge", the status of species was graded at the more grave 'U2': "unfavourable-bad". The population is not fragmented, but exists in one extensive area. The future prospects for this species were considered 'bad'. The population was unknown and had never been estimated by the Italian state according to the 2013 European assessment report, nor was it counted in the 2020 report.

According to the 2011 IUCN assessment, based on the 2009 European assessment report, the species appeared to be threatened by natural succession of the native vegetation, which may be precipitated by stated regional changes in agriculture, such as less livestock production, and lower amounts of grazing. The two other threats are said to be mining, and recreational activities (which is elsewhere also called "vandalism" in the assessment). However, according to the 2013 European assessment report, the main threats were said to be "discontinuous urbanisation" and issues with wildfires, although the report is unclear if there are too many fires or too much fire suppression. There are no specific conservation measures reported for the species.

It is protected in two Natura 2000 sites: Sciare di Marsala and the system of dunes at Capo Granitola, Porto Palo and Foce del Belice.
