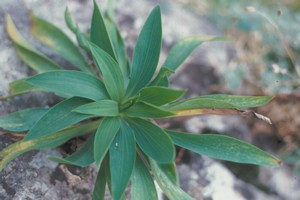

Conservation status
- Critically Endangered (IUCN 3.1)

Scientific classification
- Kingdom: Plantae
- Clade: Tracheophytes
- Clade: Angiosperms
- Clade: Eudicots
- Clade: Asterids
- Order: Apiales
- Family: Apiaceae
- Genus: Bupleurum
- Species: B. elatum

Binomial name
- Bupleurum elatum Guss.

= Bupleurum elatum =

Species of flowering plant

Bupleurum elatum is a species of flowering plant in the family Apiaceae. It is endemic to the Madonie Mountains in north-central Sicily. Its natural habitat is Mediterranean-type shrubby vegetation.
