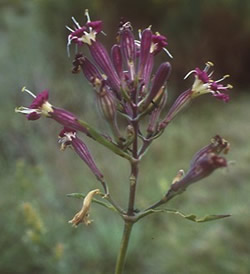

Conservation status
- Vulnerable (IUCN 3.1)

Scientific classification
- Kingdom: Plantae
- Clade: Tracheophytes
- Clade: Angiosperms
- Clade: Eudicots
- Order: Caryophyllales
- Family: Caryophyllaceae
- Genus: Silene
- Species: S. hicesiae

Binomial name
- Silene hicesiae Brullo & Signorello (1984)

= Silene hicesiae =

Species of flowering plant

Silene hicesiae is a species of plant in the family Caryophyllaceae. It is endemic to Panarea and Alicudi, which form part of the Aeolian Islands, a commune of Sicily, Italy. Its natural habitats are Mediterranean-type shrubby vegetation and rocky areas. It is threatened by habitat loss.
