= Allium hemisphaericum =

Aglio semisferico, Aglio siciliano

Scientific classification
- Kingdom: Plantae
- Clade: Tracheophytes
- Clade: Angiosperms
- Clade: Monocots
- Order: Asparagales
- Family: Amaryllidaceae
- Subfamily: Allioideae
- Genus: Allium
- Species: A. hemisphaericum

Binomial name
- Allium hemisphaericum (Sommier) Brullo

Synonyms
- Allium ampeloprasum var. hemisphaericum Sommier

Species of flowering plant

Allium hemisphaericum is a species of onion endemic to the Island of Lampedusa (Sicily) in the Mediterranean.

Little is known about Allium hemisphaericum.
