= Romulea variicolor =

Scientific classification
- Kingdom: Plantae
- Clade: Tracheophytes
- Clade: Angiosperms
- Clade: Monocots
- Order: Asparagales
- Family: Iridaceae
- Genus: Romulea
- Species: R. variicolor

Binomial name
- Romulea variicolor Mifsud (2015)

Varieties
- Romulea variicolor var. martynii Mifsud; Romulea variicolor var. mirandae Mifsud; Romulea variicolor var. variicolor

Species of plant

Romulea variicolor is a species of plant in the family Iridaceae. It is endemic to Malta.

Three varieties are accepted.

- Romulea variicolor var. martynii Mifsud
- Romulea variicolor var. mirandae Mifsud
- Romulea variicolor var. variicolor

== Sources ==
This article incorporates text from a free content work. Licensed under CC0 (license statement/permission). Text taken from Romulea variicolor. Encyclopedia of Life.
