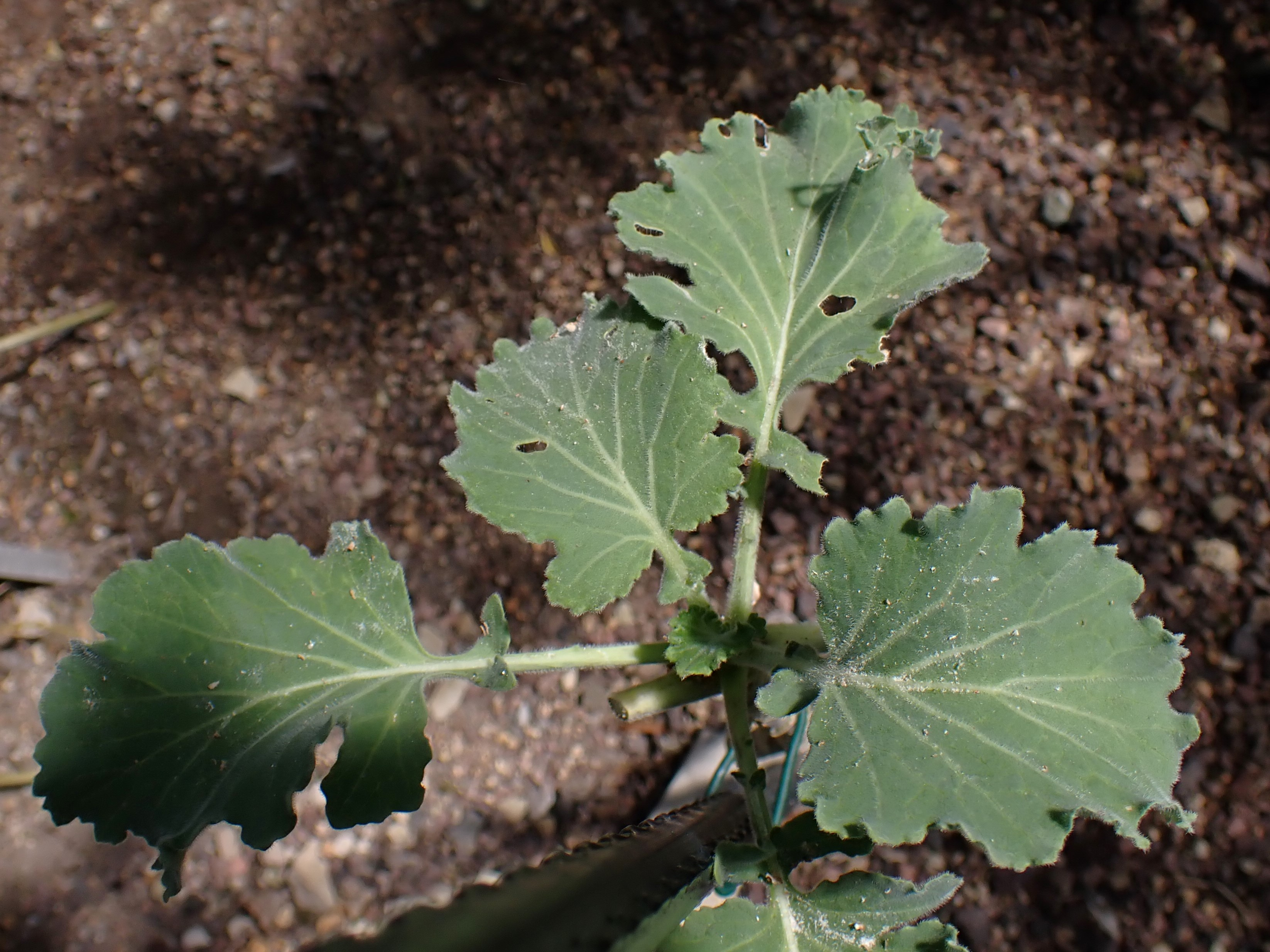

Conservation status
- Near Threatened (IUCN 3.1)

Scientific classification
- Kingdom: Plantae
- Clade: Tracheophytes
- Clade: Angiosperms
- Clade: Eudicots
- Clade: Rosids
- Order: Brassicales
- Family: Brassicaceae
- Genus: Brassica
- Species: B. villosa

Binomial name
- Brassica villosa Biv.

Subspecies
- 5; see text

Synonyms
- Brassica oleracea var. villosa (Biv.) Coss.; Brassica rupestris subsp. villosa (Biv.) Snogerup ex Hanelt

= Brassica villosa =

Species of plant

Brassica villosa is a species of flowering plant in genus Brassica. It is a subshrub endemic to northwestern and central Sicily.

It grows on limestone, and rarely sandstone, cliffs, typically on north-facing or otherwise shady locations, from near sea level to 1,000 meters elevation.

== Subspecies ==
Five subspecies are accepted.

- Brassica villosa subsp. bivoniana (Mazzola & Raimondo) Raimondo & Mazzola
- Brassica villosa subsp. brevisiliqua (Raimondo & Mazzola) Raimondo & Geraci
- Brassica villosa subsp. drepanensis (Caruel) Raimondo & Mazzola
- Brassica villosa subsp. tineoi (Lojac.) Raimondo & Mazzola
- Brassica villosa subsp. villosa
