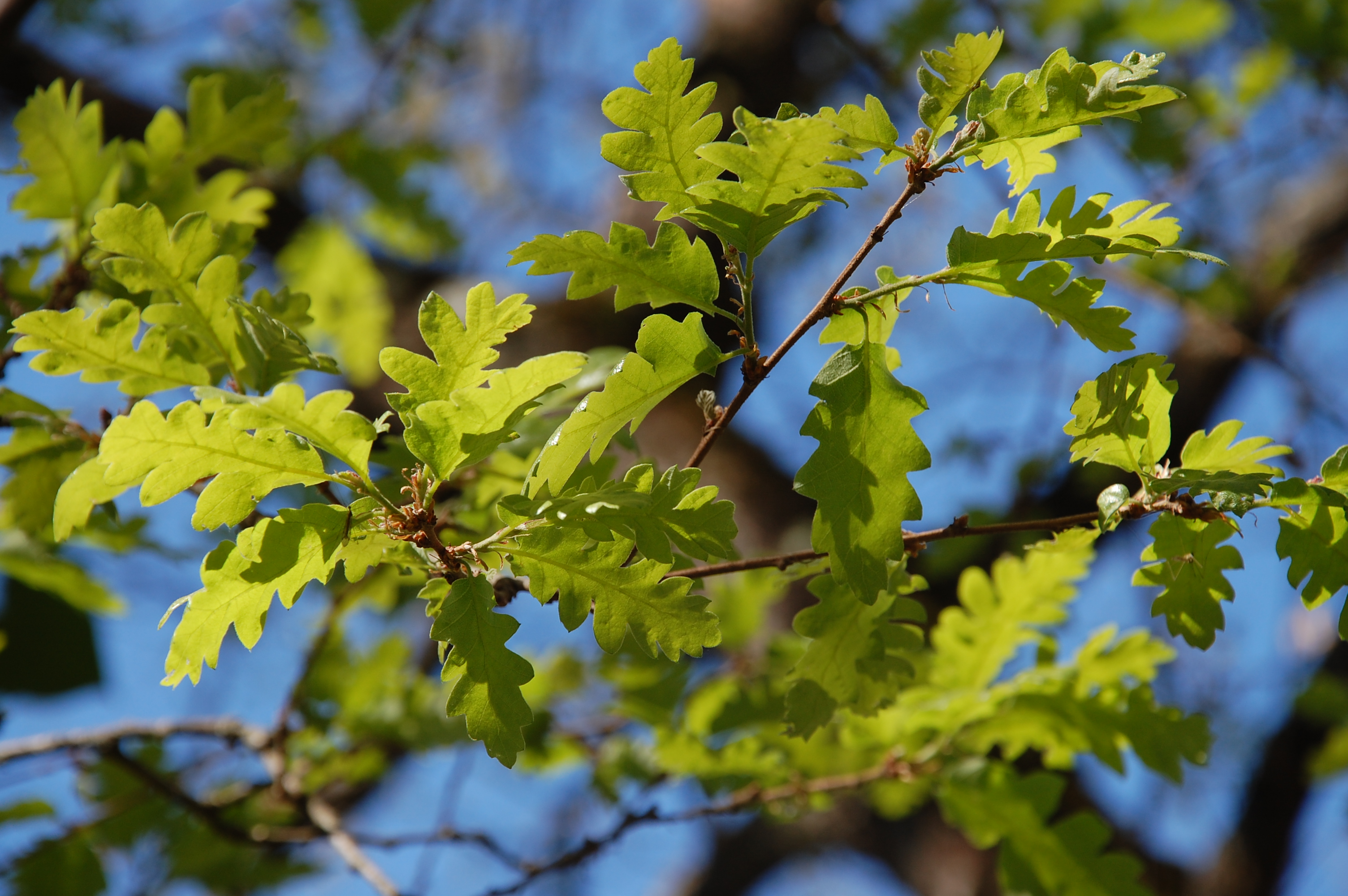

Scientific classification
- Kingdom: Plantae
- Clade: Tracheophytes
- Clade: Angiosperms
- Clade: Eudicots
- Clade: Rosids
- Order: Fagales
- Family: Fagaceae
- Genus: Quercus
- Subgenus: Quercus subg. Cerris
- Section: Quercus sect. Cerris
- Species: Q. gussonei

Binomial name
- Quercus gussonei (Borzì) Brullo (1984)

Synonyms
- Quercus cerris var. gussonei Borzì (1911)

= Quercus gussonei =

Species of oak

Quercus gussonei is a species of oak native to northern Sicily. It is a deciduous tree growing up to 25 meters tall. It is native to the mountains of northern Sicily from 700 to 1000 meters elevation.

The plant was first described as Quercus cerris var. gussonei in 1911 by Antonino Borzì. In 1984 Salvatore Brullo described it as a separate species.
