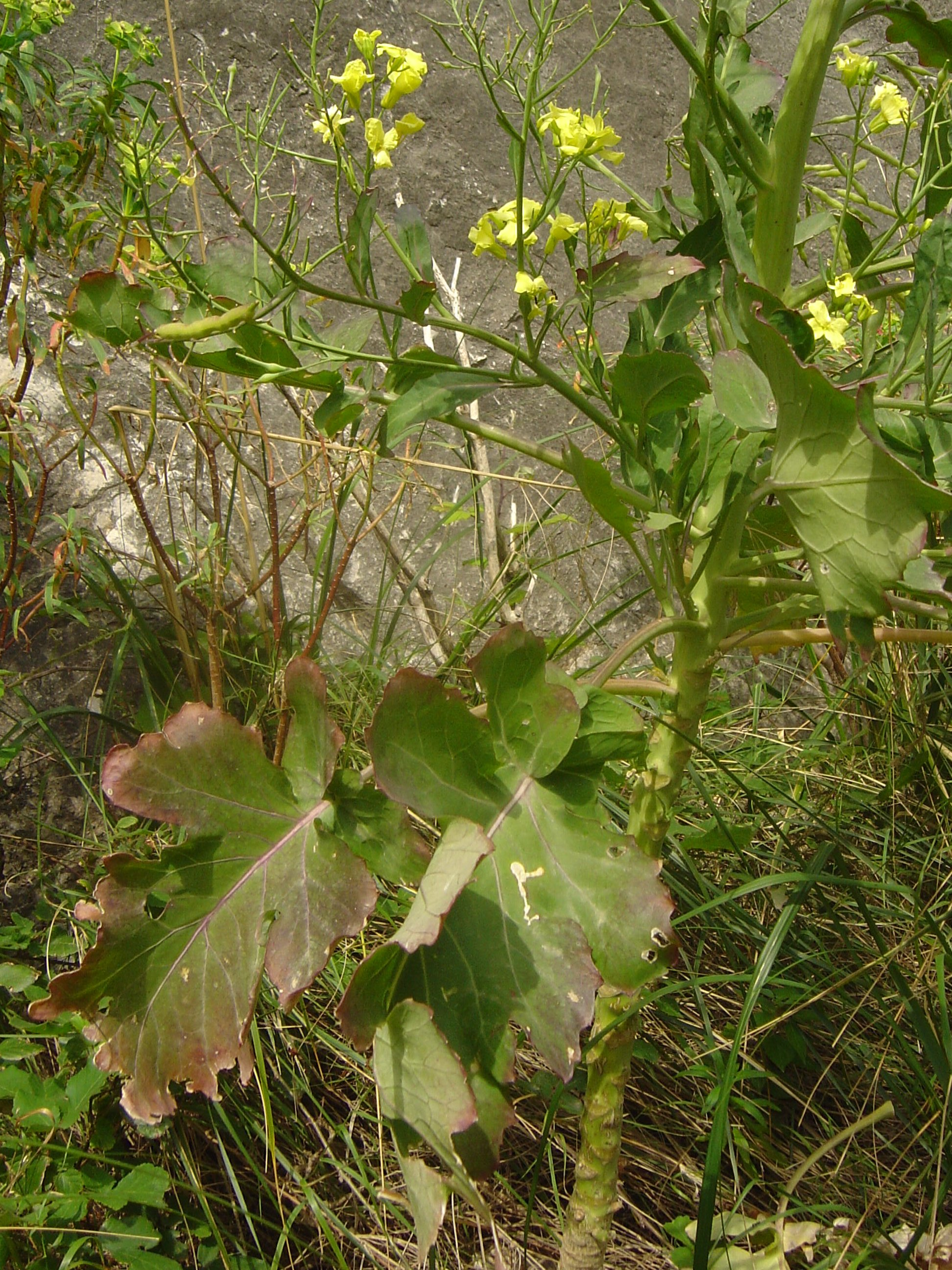
- Flowers and leaves

Scientific classification
- Kingdom: Plantae
- Clade: Embryophytes
- Clade: Tracheophytes
- Clade: Angiosperms
- Clade: Eudicots
- Clade: Rosids
- Order: Brassicales
- Family: Brassicaceae
- Genus: Brassica
- Species: B. rupestris

Binomial name
- Brassica rupestris Raf.

= Brassica rupestris =

Species of flowering plant

Brassica rupestris is a species of flowering plant in the family Brassicaceae, native to southwestern Italy and Sicily. The plant is known to grow on vertical limestone cliffs. In the past it was proposed, based on morphology, that Brassica rupestris contributed to the ancestry of either kale or kohlrabi, but DNA evidence shows that it did not.

== Taxonomy ==
Brassica rupestris was described and named by Constantine Samuel Rafinesque in 1810. In 1997 Francesco Raimondo and Pietro Mazzola erected a subspecies, Brassica rupestris subsp. hispida, based on very slight differences including leaf hairiness and silique size, which is not supported by molecular studies. In 2020 subspecies monilicarpa and tardarae were named.

== Subspecies ==
The following subspecies are currently accepted:

- Brassica rupestris subsp. hispida Raimondo & Mazzola – Sicily
- Brassica rupestris subsp. monilicarpa Raimondo & Spadaro – southern Italy
- Brassica rupestris subsp. rupestris – southwestern Italy, Sicily
- Brassica rupestris subsp. tardarae (Ilardi, Geraci & Troìa) Raimondo – southern Sicily

== Chemistry ==
There were a number of substances of note found in the roots and shoots of B. rupestris. These were tartaric acid ester, reduced glutathione (GSH), ascorbic acid, dehydroascorbic acid, glucobrassicin, and glucoraphanin.

== Distribution and habitat ==
Brassica rupestris subsp. rupestris is found in mountainous areas of Calabria and Sicily, and has been reassessed as Least Concern, while B. rupestris subsp. hispida is found in a number of stations in Sicily and has been reassessed as Vulnerable. Both subspecies typically live on near-vertical limestone cliffs, with B. rupestris subsp. rupestris found from 0 to 1,100 m (0 to 3,600 ft) above sea level, and B. rupestris subsp. hispida found from 800 to 1,300 m (2,600 to 4,300 ft).
