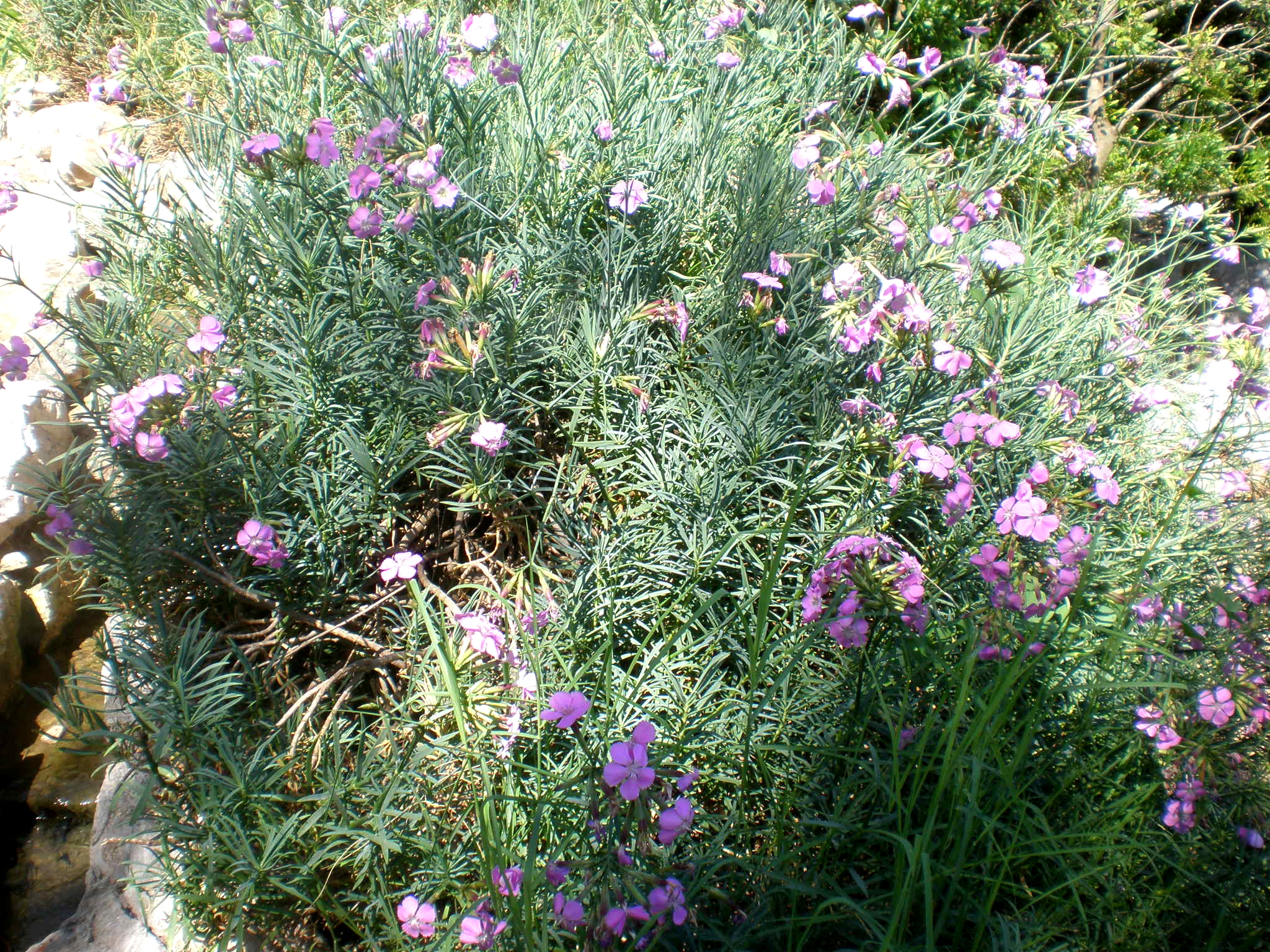

Conservation status
- Near Threatened (IUCN 3.1)

Scientific classification
- Kingdom: Plantae
- Clade: Tracheophytes
- Clade: Angiosperms
- Clade: Eudicots
- Order: Caryophyllales
- Family: Caryophyllaceae
- Genus: Dianthus
- Species: D. rupicola

Binomial name
- Dianthus rupicola Biv.

Synonyms
- List: Dianthus arborescens Hoffmanns.; Dianthus bertolonii J.Woods; Dianthus bisignanii Ten.; Dianthus involucratus Poir.; Dianthus rupicola var. bertolonii (J.Woods) Arcang.; Dianthus suffruticosus Willd.

= Dianthus rupicola =

Species of flowering plant

Dianthus rupicola is a species of Dianthus native to Sicily, nearby areas of mainland Italy, Spain's Balearic Islands, and northeastern Tunisia. It tends to grow in a few populations on steep cliffs, and consequently is viewed as at risk from climate change.

== Subspecies ==
A number of subspecies have been described:

- Dianthus rupicola subsp. aeolicus (Lojac.) Brullo & Miniss. – northeastern Sicily and the Aeolian Islands
- Dianthus rupicola subsp. bocchoriana L.Llorens & Gradaille – Balearic Islands (Mallorca)
- Dianthus rupicola subsp. hermaeensis (Coss.) O.Bolòs & Vigo – northeastern Tunisia
- Dianthus rupicola subsp. lopadusanus Brullo & Miniss. – southern Italy and northern Sicily
- Dianthus rupicola subsp. rupicola – southern Italy and northern Sicily
