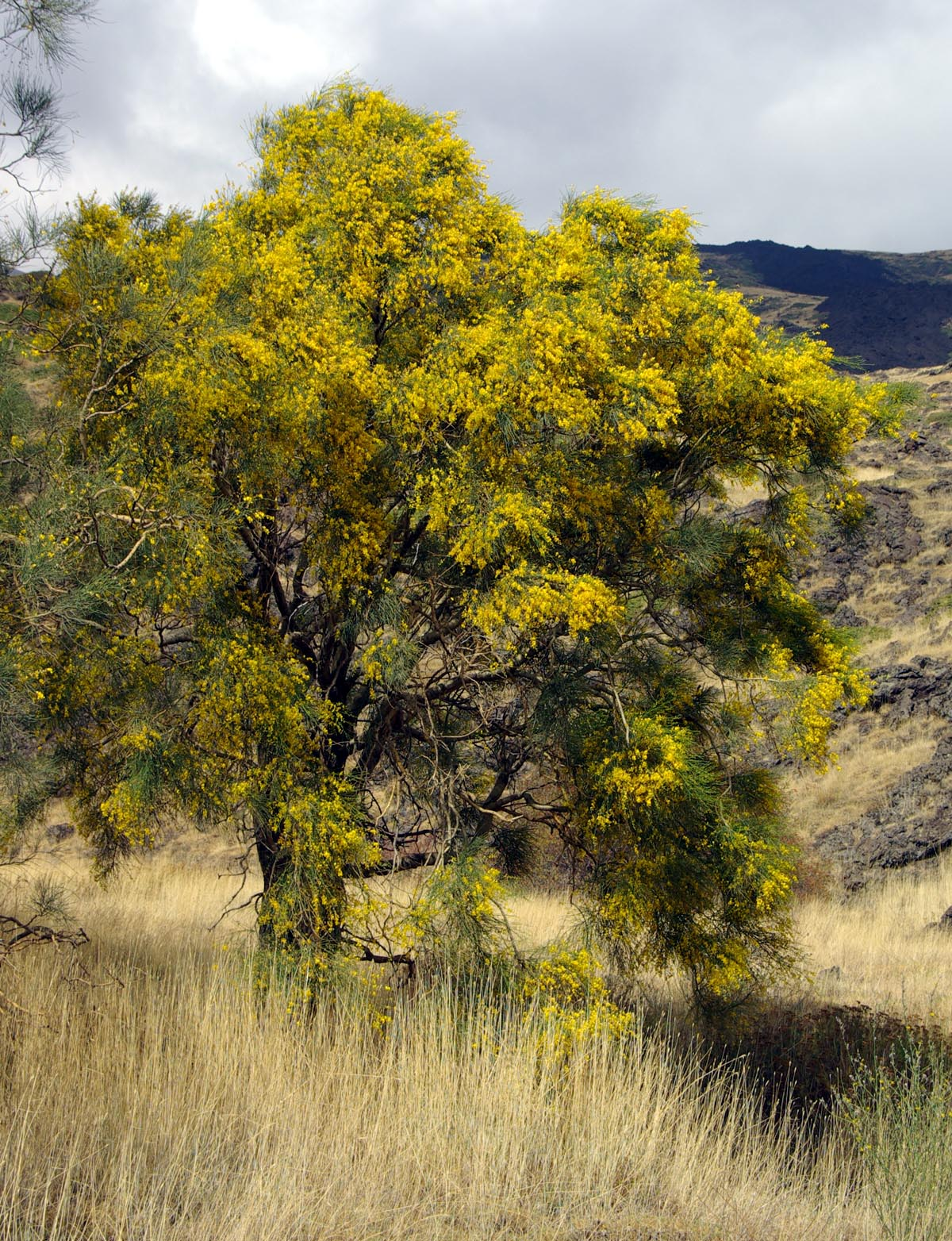

Conservation status
- Least Concern (IUCN 3.1)

Scientific classification
- Kingdom: Plantae
- Clade: Tracheophytes
- Clade: Angiosperms
- Clade: Eudicots
- Clade: Rosids
- Order: Fabales
- Family: Fabaceae
- Subfamily: Faboideae
- Genus: Genista
- Species: G. aetnensis

Binomial name
- Genista aetnensis (Raf.) DC. (1825)

Subspecies
- Genista etnensis subsp. etnensis; Genista etnensis subsp. sarda (C.Presl) Fridl.

Synonyms
- Cytisanthus etnensis (Raf.) Cristof. & Feoli (1977); Dendrospartum etnense (Raf.) Spach (1845); Drymospartum etnense (Raf.) C.Presl (1845); Lugaion etnense (Raf.) Raf. (1838); Spartium etnense Raf. (1814)

= Genista aetnensis =

Species of flowering plant

Genista aetnensis, the Mount Etna broom, is a species of flowering plant in the legume family Fabaceae. It is a large shrub or small tree endemic to Corsica, Sardinia, and Sicily where it is associated with sunny, open landscapes and poor, stony soil. It is a very common constituent of the garigue plant communities, Mediterranean shrubby vegetation, around the lower slopes of Mount Etna, hence its Latin specific epithet aetnensis.

The young plant is typical of brooms, clothed in narrow linear leaves which soon drop off leaving almost bare branches. As it ages the shrub develops into a shapely small tree with a greenish bark, growing to 8 metres (26 ft) if given room to develop. The terminal branches have a tendency to droop and weep. Abundant pea-like, yellow, jasmine-scented flowers cover the whole crown in late summer.

Two subspecies are accepted:

- Genista etnensis subsp. etnensis – Sicily
- Genista etnensis subsp. sarda (C.Presl) Fridl. – Corsica and Sardinia

It is sometimes grown in gardens and landscaping, both for flower and for its attractive shape when mature. It is hardy down to −15 °C (5 °F). In cultivation in the UK it has gained the Royal Horticultural Society's Award of Garden Merit.

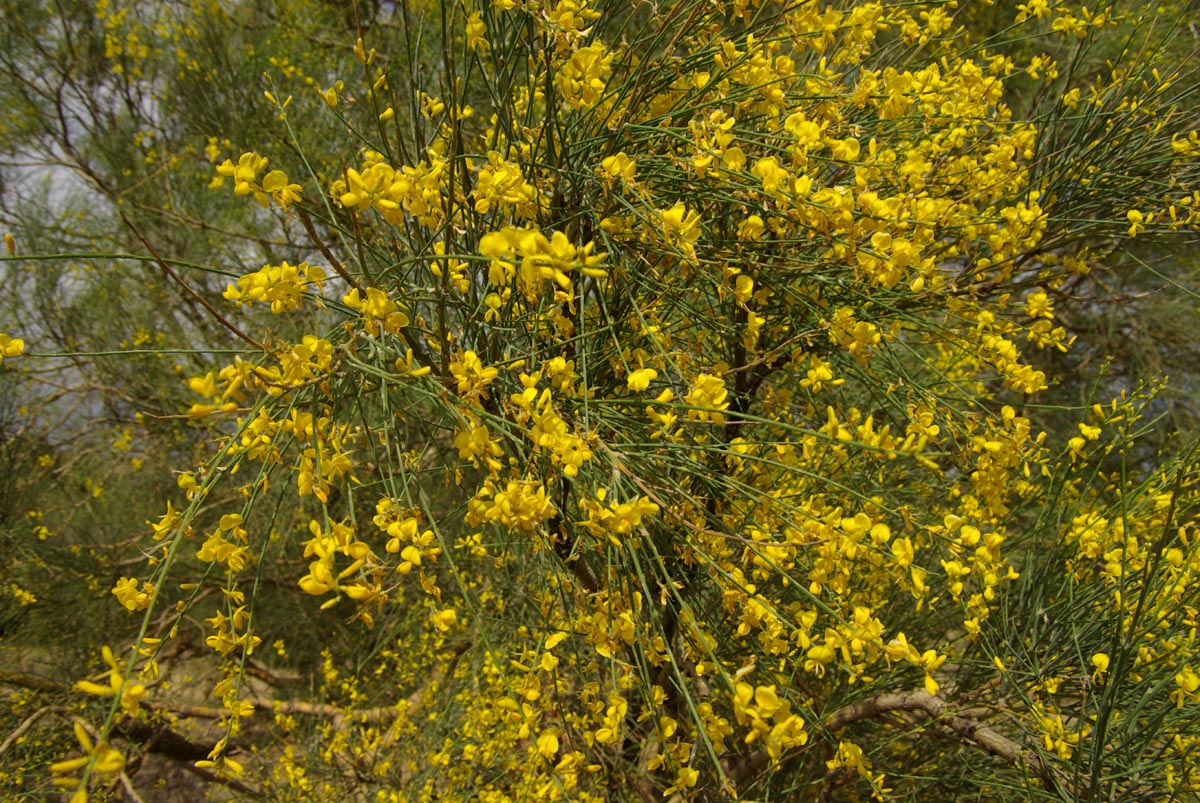

== See also ==
- Brooms
- Mediterranean forests, woodlands, and scrub
