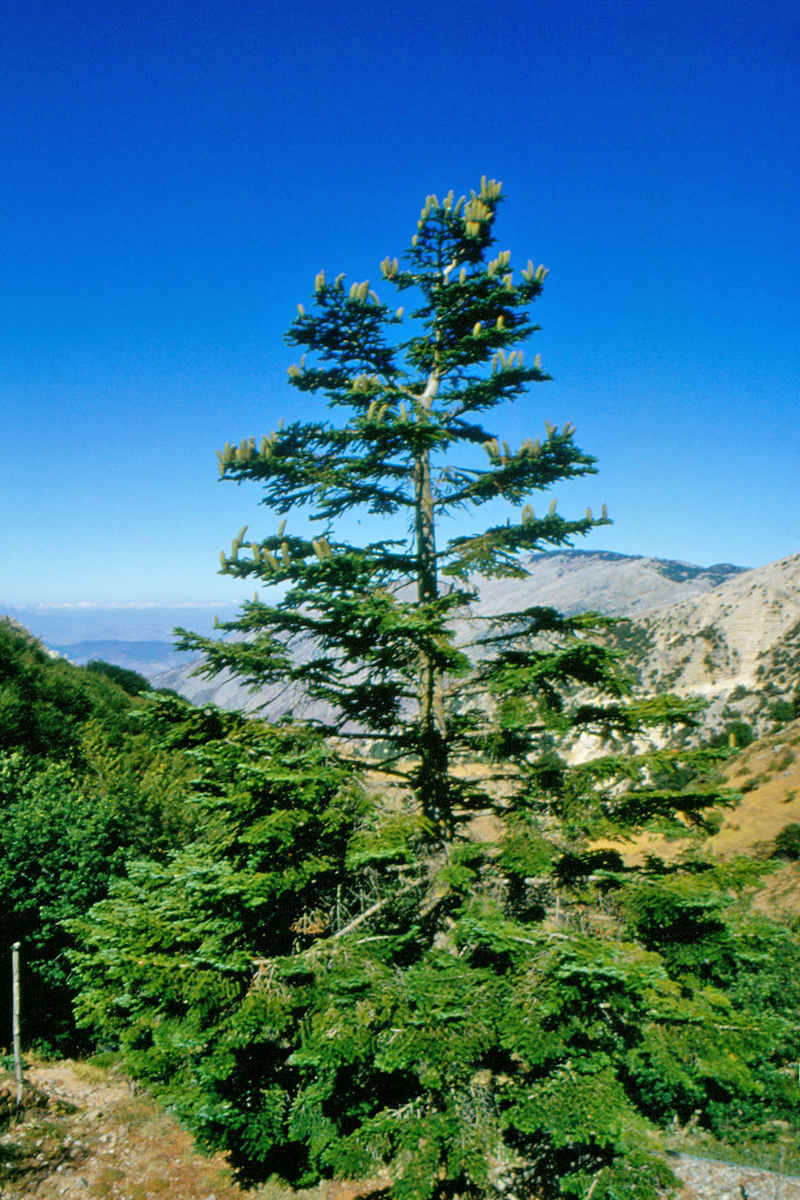
- Abies nebrodensis

Conservation status
- Critically Endangered (IUCN 3.1)

Scientific classification
- Kingdom: Plantae
- Clade: Tracheophytes
- Clade: Gymnosperms
- Division: Pinophyta
- Class: Pinopsida
- Order: Pinales
- Family: Pinaceae
- Genus: Abies
- Species: A. nebrodensis

Binomial name
- Abies nebrodensis (Lojac.) Mattei
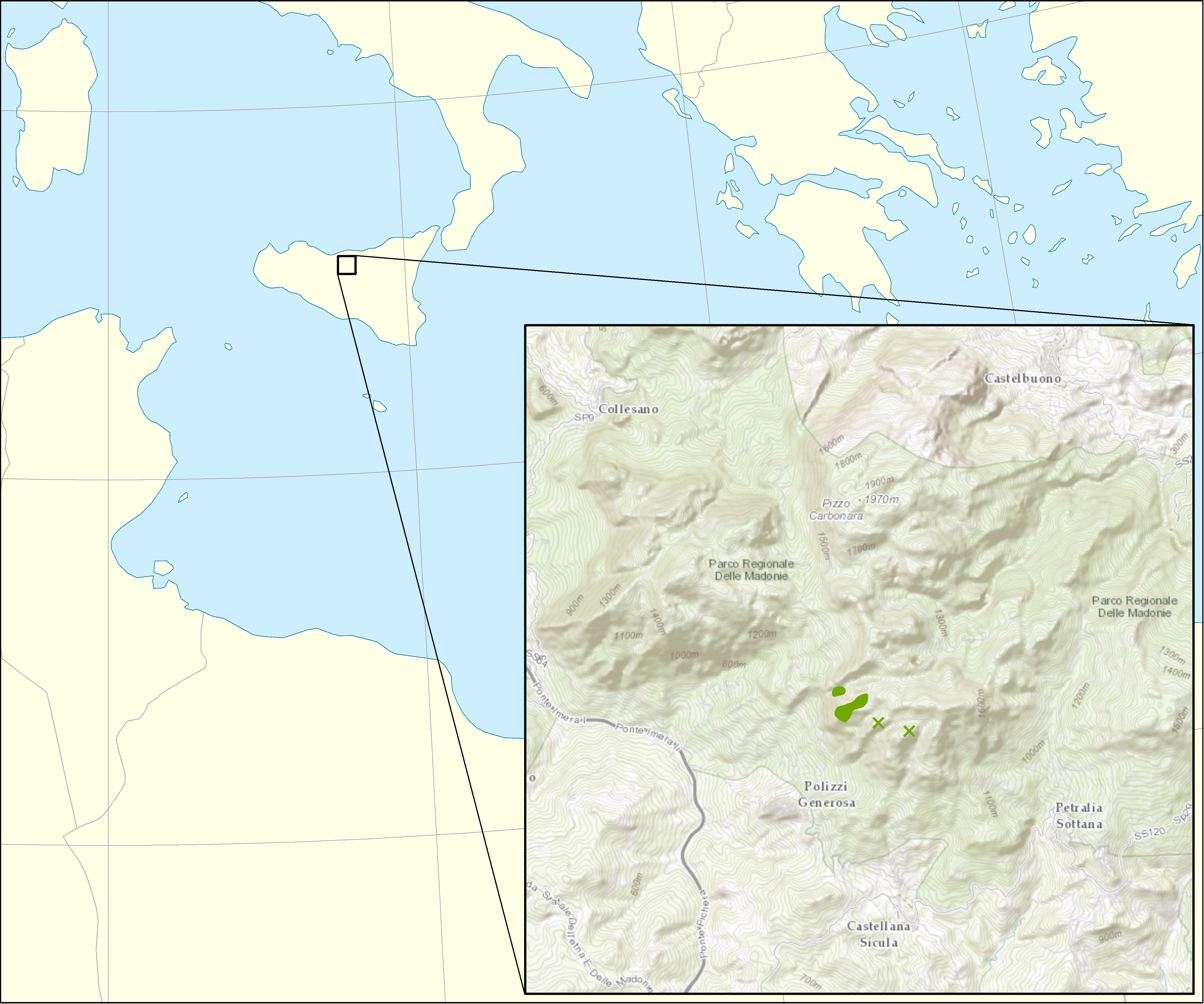
- Continuous range ✖ Isolated population

= Abies nebrodensis =

Sicilian fir

Species of conifer

Abies nebrodensis, the Sicilian fir, is a fir native to the Madonie mountains in northern Sicily.

== Taxonomy ==
It is closely related to silver fir, Abies alba, which replaces it in the Apennine Mountains of Italy and elsewhere further north in Europe; some botanists treat Sicilian fir as a variety of silver fir, as Abies alba var. nebrodensis. Needle morphology and genetic studies showed ancient relationships of Abies nebrodensis with southern Italy Abies alba, Abies cephalonica and Abies numidica.

== Description ==
It is a medium-size evergreen coniferous tree growing to 15–25 m (49–82 ft) tall and with a trunk diameter of up to 1 m (3 ft 3 in).

The leaves are needle-like, flattened, 1.5–2.5 cm (0.6–1.0 in) long and 2 mm wide by 0.5 mm thick, glossy dark green above, and with two greenish-white bands of stomata below. The tip of the leaf is blunt with a notched tip, but sometimes with a pointed tip, particularly on shoots high on older trees. The cones are 10–16 cm (3.9–6.3 in) long and 4 cm (1.6 in) broad, with about 150 scales, each scale with an exserted bract and two winged seeds; they disintegrate when mature to release the seeds.

== Distribution ==
Despite its scientific name, the species is of Mt. Scalone in the Madonie Mountains in the north-central part of Sicily.

== Ecology ==
It occurs at elevations of 1,400–1,600 metres (4,600–5,200 ft). It is limited to the steep, dry slopes.

== Conservation ==
As a result of deforestation, it is now extremely rare, with only 27 mature trees and a few seedlings are surviving in situ; replanting programmes are meeting with limited success due to heavy grazing pressure by livestock belonging to local farmers. Assisted migration programmes are being carried out by the University of Palermo as well as by the CREA Research Centre for Forestry and Wood of Arezzo in order to preserve the gene pool from the effect of the climatic belt shift. It has been classified as Critically Endangered in the IUCN Red List in 2017. In the European Union it has been designated as a 'priority species' under Annex II of the Habitats Directive, which means areas in which it occurs can be declared Special Areas of Conservation, if these areas belong to one of the number of habitats listed in Annex I of the directive.
