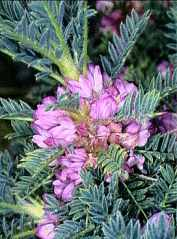

Scientific classification
- Kingdom: Plantae
- Clade: Tracheophytes
- Clade: Angiosperms
- Clade: Eudicots
- Clade: Rosids
- Order: Fabales
- Family: Fabaceae
- Subfamily: Faboideae
- Genus: Astragalus
- Species: A. siculus

Binomial name
- Astragalus siculus Biv.

= Astragalus siculus =

Sicilian milkvetch

Species of legume

Astragalus siculus, known as the Sicilian milkvetch, is a plant endemic to Sicily.
