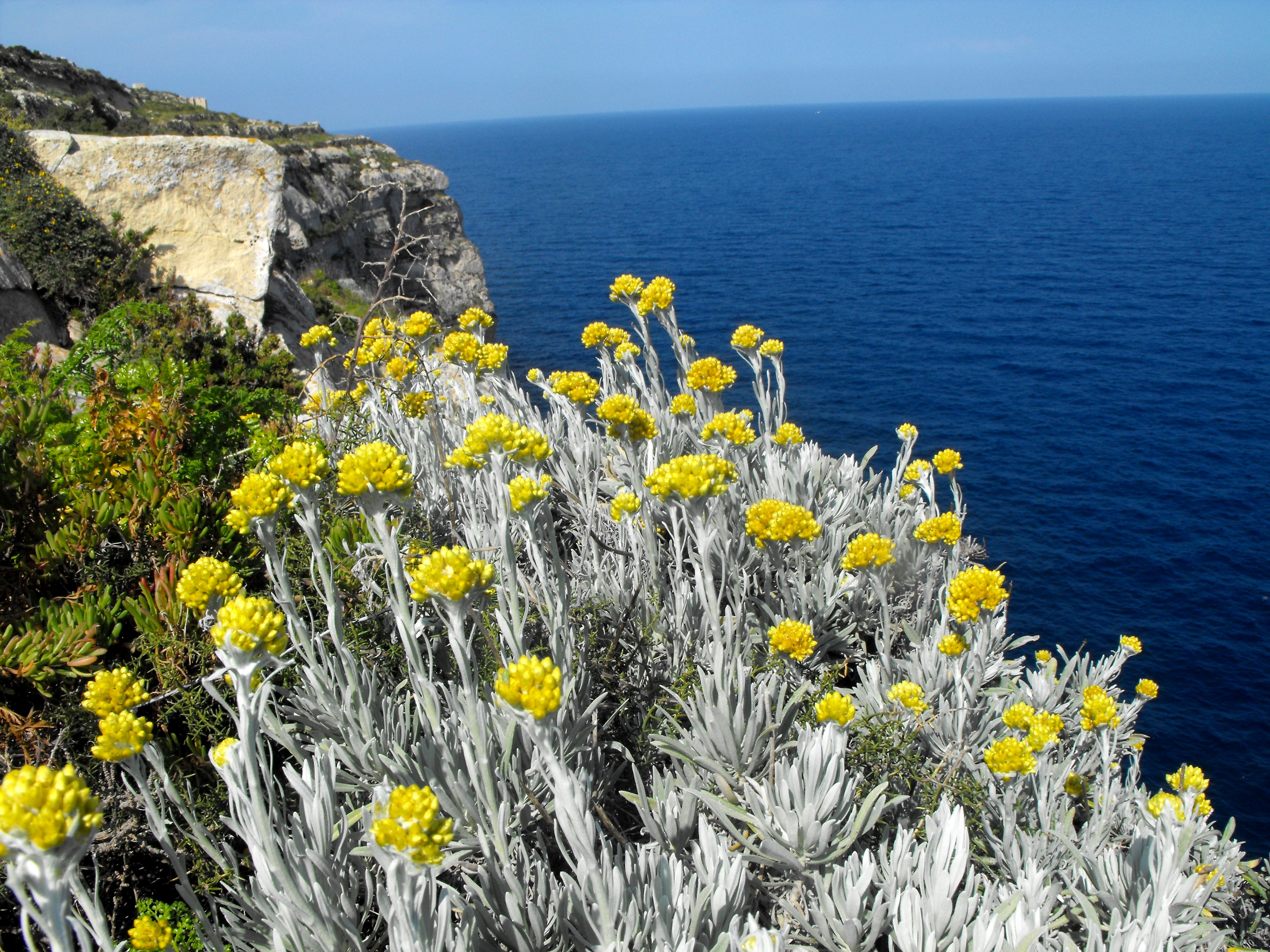

Conservation status
- Critically Endangered (IUCN 3.1)

Scientific classification
- Kingdom: Plantae
- Clade: Tracheophytes
- Clade: Angiosperms
- Clade: Eudicots
- Clade: Asterids
- Order: Asterales
- Family: Asteraceae
- Genus: Helichrysum
- Species: H. panormitanum
- Subspecies: H. p. subsp. melitense

Trinomial name
- Helichrysum panormitanum subsp. melitense (Pignatti) Iamonico & Pignatti

Synonyms
- Helichrysum melitense (Pignatti) Brullo, Lanfr., Pavone & Ronsisv.; Helichrysum rupestre var. melitense Pignatti

= Helichrysum panormitanum subsp. melitense =

Species of plant

Helichrysum panormitanum subsp. melitense, synonym Helichrysum melitense, is a subspecies of flowering plant in the family Asteraceae and is endemic to Malta, specifically to the island of Gozo. It is known as the Maltese everlasting. It can be found in Dwejra, and in cliffs in Gozo near Fungus Rock. Its natural habitats are Mediterranean-type shrubby vegetation on Coastal garigue and vertical sheer cliffs. Recently, it was recorded in new locations on the island of Gozo. This plant is on the decline in the wild, and it is threatened by habitat loss. It is very easy to cultivate, and it is gaining ornamental popularity amongst the locals.

== Description ==
This is a low shrub, ranging from 30 to 70 cm in height; has small lanceolate leaves that are erect; and the flower heads only contain yellow tubular florets. The flowers smell like curry, and when flowers are kept dry indoors, they can last for many years with their original colours, hence the name 'everlasting'. The leaves have many tiny silvery hairs on their surface, and when wet they look green, but when dry they look silvery. The hairs protect the plant for the heavy winds and summer drought from drying up.

== See also ==
- Endemic Maltese wildlife
- Flora of Malta
