= Madonie =

Mountain range in Sicily, Italy

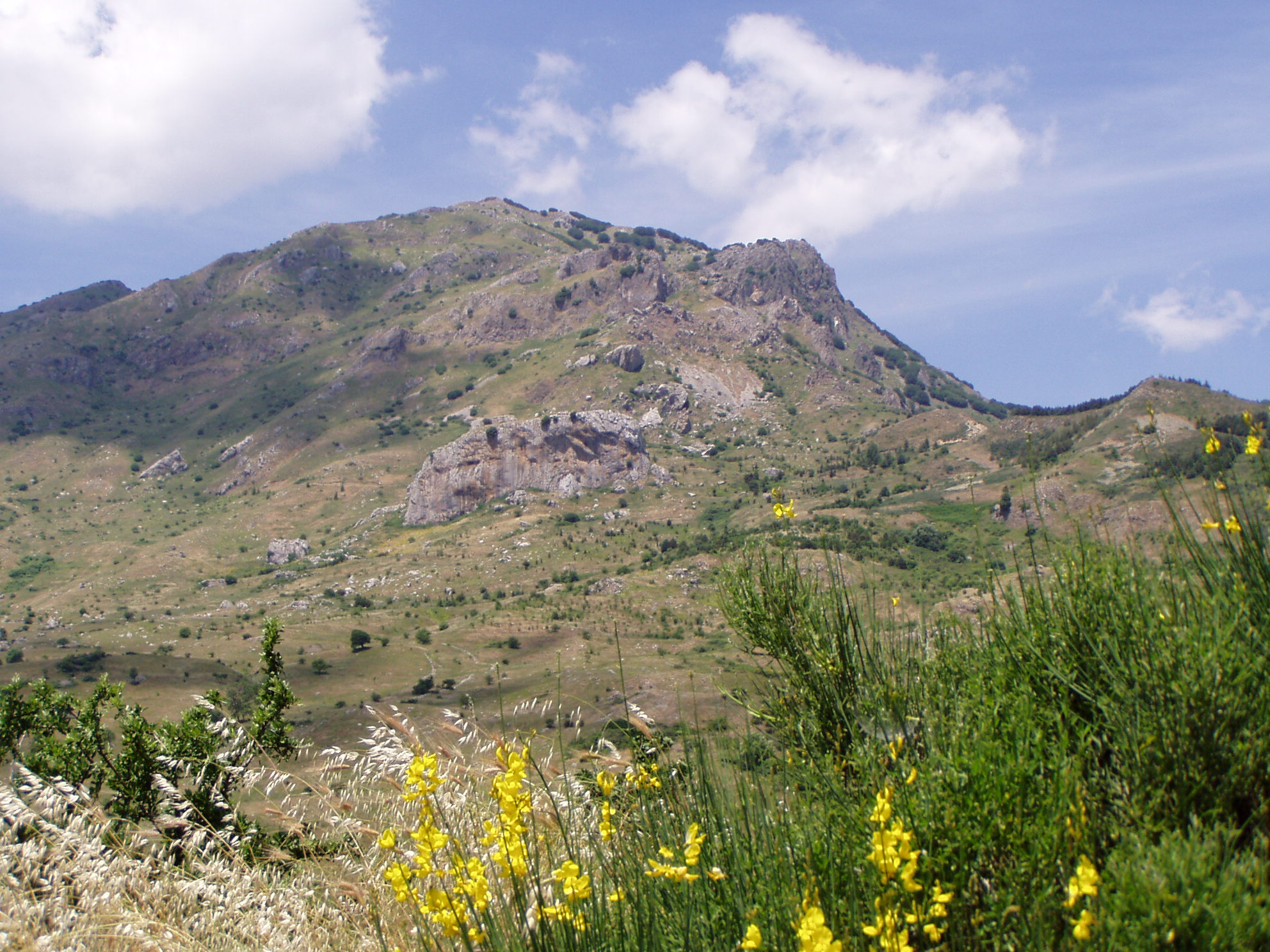
- Monte S. Salvatore in Madonie Regional Natural Park.

Highest point
- Peak: Pizzo Carbonara
- Elevation: 1,979 m (6,493 ft)
- Coordinates: 37°53′N 14°01′E

Geography
- Location within Sicily
- Country: Italy
- Region: Sicily
- Province: Palermo
- Parent range: Apennine Mountains
- Biome: South Apennine mixed montane forests

The Madonie (Italian pronunciation: [madoˈniːe]; Sicilian: Madunìi) are one of the principal mountain ranges on the island of Sicily, located in the Northern part of the island.

Its name comes from the feud of Madonìa which belonged to the noble family of La Farina from Palermo and then to the Marquises Crescimanni of Madonìa.

== Geography ==
The range is located within Palermo Province of Sicily. It is part of the Sicilian extension of the Apennine Mountains System that runs along the Italian Peninsula.

The range includes the next highest elevation mountain summits of Sicily after Mount Etna. The highest peak of the range is Pizzo Carbonara at 1,979 metres (6,493 ft), followed by neighboring Pizzo Antenna at 1,977 metres (6,486 ft).

== Ecology ==
The mountains' varied elevation, microclimates, exposure, and geology create distinct habitats which are home to diverse plant communities.

Evergreen laurel forests grow in ravines on the northern slopes of the massif between 300 and 560 meters elevation, where the exposure and topography allow more year-round moisture. Laurel (Laurus nobilis) is the dominant tree, together with Quercus ilex and Quercus pubescens subsp. pubescens. These trees form low thickets 6 to 12 meters tall, with a relatively open canopy with 50–80% coverage. The relatively shady, cool, and humid forest understory is home to many species of plants including Rhamnus lojaconoi, a shrub or small tree endemic to Madonie, as well as Asplenium adiantum-nigrum, Rubia peregrina, Ruscus aculeatus, Asparagus acutifolius, Woodwardia radicans, Pteris vittata, Vitis vinifera, and several rare, endemic, and limited-range species.

Other plant species endemic to the Madonie are Sicilian fir (Abies nebrodensis), Allium nebrodense, Bupleurum elatum, and Sorbus madoniensis.

== Madonie Regional Natural Park ==
The mountains were safeguarded in 1989 by the formation of the Madonie Regional Natural Park, a regional natural park.

Madonie Geopark is a member of the European Geoparks Network and the UNESCO Global Network of National Geoparks.

=== Features ===
Within the park area, there are outcrops of rocks that have been dated over a 200-million-year period and represent all aspects of the geology of Sicily apart from present-day volcanic activity. There is a wide range of fossils present within the mountains' rocks. Buildings made from these rocks in the Madonie's towns often show visible fossils.

The area was famous for the Circuito Piccolo delle Madonie, where the Targa Florio race was held from 1906 to 1977.

== See also ==
- Mountain ranges of Sicily
- Protected areas of the Apennines
