= Salvatore Brullo =

Italian botanist (born 1947)

Salvatore Brullo (born 23 February 1947, Modica, Italy) is professor at University of Catania since 1980 teaching Systematic Botany, he obtained a degree in natural science in July 1970. For six years he was Director of the Department of Botany, at the University of Catania.

He has described numerous Sicilian endemics, including Allium franciniae, Allium lopadusanum, Campanula marcenoi, Chiliadenus bocconei, Desmazeria pignattii, Genista demarcoi, Helichrysum hyblaeum, Helichrysum melitense, Hyoseris frutescens, Limonium aegusae, Limonium lojaconoi, Limonium lopadusanum, Limonium lylibeum, Scilla dimartinoi, Silene hicesiae, Valantia calva.

== See also ==
- Category:Taxa named by Salvatore Brullo

== Books ==
- 1970. Vegetazione psammofila presso il Capo Isola delle Correnti, Sicilia sud-orientale. Catania
- 1971. Vegetazione dei pantani litoranei della Sicilia sud-orientale e problema della conservazione dell'ambiente. Catania
- salvatore Brullo, maria Grillo, maria carmen Terrasi. 1976. Ricerche fitosociologiche sui pascoli di Monte Lauro (Sicilia meridionale). Pubblicazioni dell'Istituto di botanica dell'Università di Catania. Ed. Tip. Ospizio di Beneficenza. 104 pp.
- salvatore Brullo, andrea Di Martino, marceno Cosimo. 1977. La vegetazione di Pantelleria : studio fitosociologico. 110 pp. Catania
- salvatore Brullo, francesco Furnari. 1979. Researches on the genus Amaracus Gled. (Labiatae) in Cyrenaica. Pubblicazioni dell'Istituto di botanica dell'Università di Catania. 449 pp.
- salvatore Brullo, francesco Furnari. 1979. Taxonomic and nomenclatural notes on the flora of Cyrenaica (Libya). Pubblicazioni dell'Istituto di botanica dell'Università di Catania. 174 pp.
- 1979. Taxonomic and nomenclatural notes on the genera Jasonia Cass. and Chiliadenus Cass. (Compositae). Pubblicazioni dell'Istituto di botanica dell'Università di Catania. 308 pp.
- salvatore Brullo, pietro Pavone. 1981. Chromosome numbers in the Sicilian species of Limonium Miller (Plumbaginaceae). Pubblicazioni dell'Istituto di botanica dell'Università di Catania. 555 pp.
- salvatore Brullo, francesco Furnari. 1981. Phytogeographical considerations on the coastal vegetation of Cyrenaica. Pubblicazioni dell'Istituto di botanica dell'Università di Catania. 772 pp.
- salvatore Brullo, w. De Leonardis, pietro Pavone. 1982. Chromosome numbers of some Sicilian ferns. 281 pp. Pubblicazioni dell'Istituto di botanica dell'Università di Catania
- salvatore Brullo, fabrizio Scelsi, giovanni Spampinato. 2001. La vegetazione dell'Aspromonte. Studio fitosociologico. Ed. Laruffa. 368 pp. ISBN 8872211603
