= Giovanni Gussone =

Italian botanist (1787–1866)

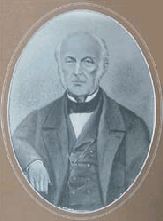
Giovanni Gussone

Giovanni Gussone (8 February 1787, in Villamaina – 14 January 1866, in Naples) was an Italian academic and botanist, remembered for his work in plant taxonomy and in particular his research in Sicilian flora.

He studied medicine in Naples, where he came under the influence of botanist Michele Tenore. Following graduation in 1811, he worked under Tenore as a manager of the Orto Botanico di Napoli (botanical garden in Naples). In 1817 he moved to Sicily, where he was appointed director of the botanical garden at Boccadifalco, outside of Palermo. In Sicily, he conducted extensive investigations of the island's flora, publishing two major works as a result, "Florae Siculae Prodromus" and "Florae Siculae Synopsis". In 1827 he returned to Naples as superintendent of the botanical gardens. In 1861 he was named by Victor Emmanuel as professor emeritus of the University of Naples.

Plants with the specific epithet of gussonei are named in his honor, an example being Petagnaea gussonei.

== Biography ==
He was born in Villamaina (AV) on February 8, 1787, to Gaetano and Celestina De Martino. He graduated in medicine in Naples in 1810 and decided not to practice medicine as he was attracted to the plant world. He became a student of Michele Tenore, professor of botany and director of the Botanical Garden of the University of Naples Federico II, with whom he began a deep and fruitful scientific collaboration. Collaboration that was immediately made explicit with his participation in the drafting of the monumental Flora Napolitana and his appointment as assistant in the direction of the Botanical Garden. In 1812 he began a series of studies on the flora of the Neapolitan area,Samnium and Molise, also establishing a herbarium to the enrichment of which he devoted his whole life.

In 1817 he was commissioned by Crown Prince Francis of Bourbon, then lieutenant in Sicily, to establish the experimental and acclimatization garden of Boccadifalco in Palermo. In 1827, following Francis I of the Two Sicilies accession to the throne, he was recalled to Naples and appointed Court Botanist, with the task of looking after all the royal sites. During his Sicilian sojourn he was able to carry out numerous explorations to deepen his knowledge of the local flora, moving, in part through the use of a Brigantine made available to him by the king, to the surrounding islands, which had never before been visited by naturalists. Travels, in Italy and abroad, were a constant feature of his professional activity, which he carried out both as a trustee of the king and for scientific studies and research. In 1829, for example, he accompanied King Francis I to Spain on the occasion of the wedding of his daughter, Princess Maria Christina of the Two Sicilies, to Ferdinand VII. During his stay in Madrid, he distinguished himself for his abilities and skills to the extent that he was vainly requested by the Spanish court itself. In 1830, as the court hastily returned to Naples because of the revolutionary uprisings, he stayed for two months in Paris, visiting the most important herbaria in the city, and then moved to London, where he was able to see the Linnean herbarium In 1854 he was appointed professor of botany and Agriculture at the R. Scuola di Veterinaria e di Agricoltura, established in Naples in 1848. In 1861, after the birth of the Kingdom of Italy, he was appointed by Victor Emmanuel II Professor Emeritus of the University of Naples. In the same year, in recognition of the importance of his scientific activity, the same university purchased his herbarium, allocating it to the Botanical Garden, and his personal library. During his career he held numerous positions, among which are the presidency of the Accademia Pontaniana (1862) and participation in the Higher Council of Public Education. He was also an ordinary member of the R. Accademia delle Scienze of Naples, the R. Società d'Incoraggiamento e di Storia Naturale, a corresponding member of the Accademia di scienze e lettere of Palermo, the R. Accademia Peloritana of Messina, the R. Accademia delle Scienze of Turin, the Accademia Truentina of Ascoli, the Accademia delle Scienze of Bologna, the Botanical Society of Edinburgh, and, in London, the Medico-Botanical Society and the Linnean Society.

He died in Naples on January 14, 1866.

== Written works ==
- "Plantae rariores" (1826).
- "Florae siculae prodromus" (1827–1828).
- "Flora sicula" (1829).
- Florae siculae synopsis (in Latin). Vol. 1. Napoli: Tramater. 1842.
- Florae siculae synopsis (in Latin). Vol. 2. Napoli: Tramater. 1843.
- Florae siculae synopsis (in Latin). Vol. 3. Napoli: Tramater. 1844.
- "Enumeratio plantarum vascularium in insula Inarime" (1855).
