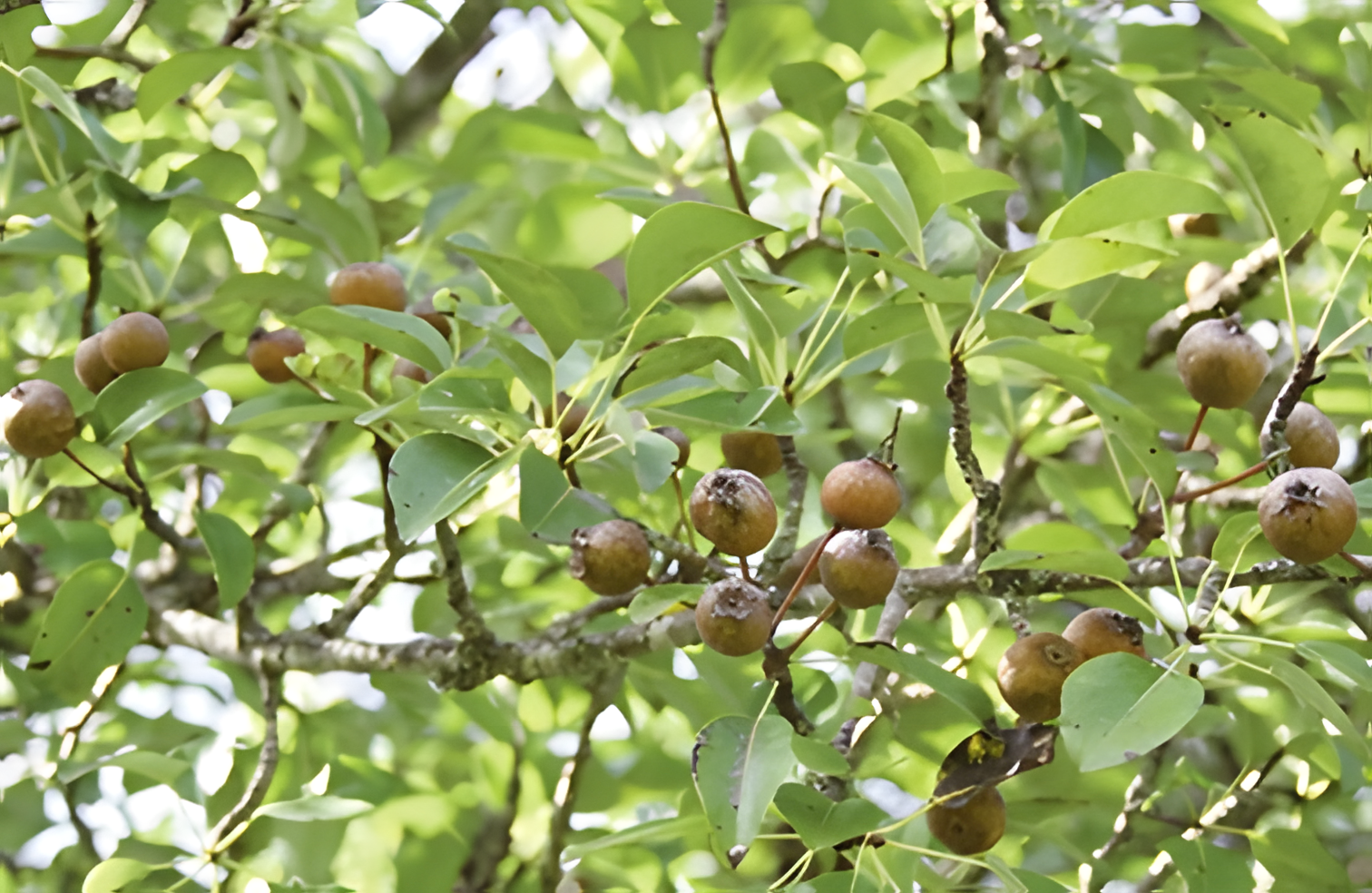

Scientific classification
- Kingdom: Plantae
- Clade: Tracheophytes
- Clade: Angiosperms
- Clade: Eudicots
- Clade: Rosids
- Order: Rosales
- Family: Rosaceae
- Genus: Pyrus
- Species: P. pedrottiana

Binomial name
- Pyrus pedrottiana Raimondo, Venturella & Domina

= Pyrus pedrottiana =

Species of flowering plant

Pyrus pedrottiana is a species of pear in the rose family (Rosaceae). It is native to Sicily, specifically the Nebrodi Mountains of northern Sicily. It is, together with P. ciancioi, P. vallis-demonis, P. sicanorum and P. castribonensis, one of five pear species endemic to the island, and was described in 2022.

== Description ==
Pyrus pedrottiana is a medium-sized pyramidal tree of 10-12 m height. The white flowers appear in corymbs of 5-9 (exceptionally 2-11). The pome fruits are roundish or exceptionally pyriform and around 2 cm in diameter, with a rough, brown exocarp, hanging on stalks up to 30 cm long. The seeds are 4-6 mm in size, dark brown, and shiny. The leaves are hairless, ovate to elliptical, with stalks 2-3 cm long.

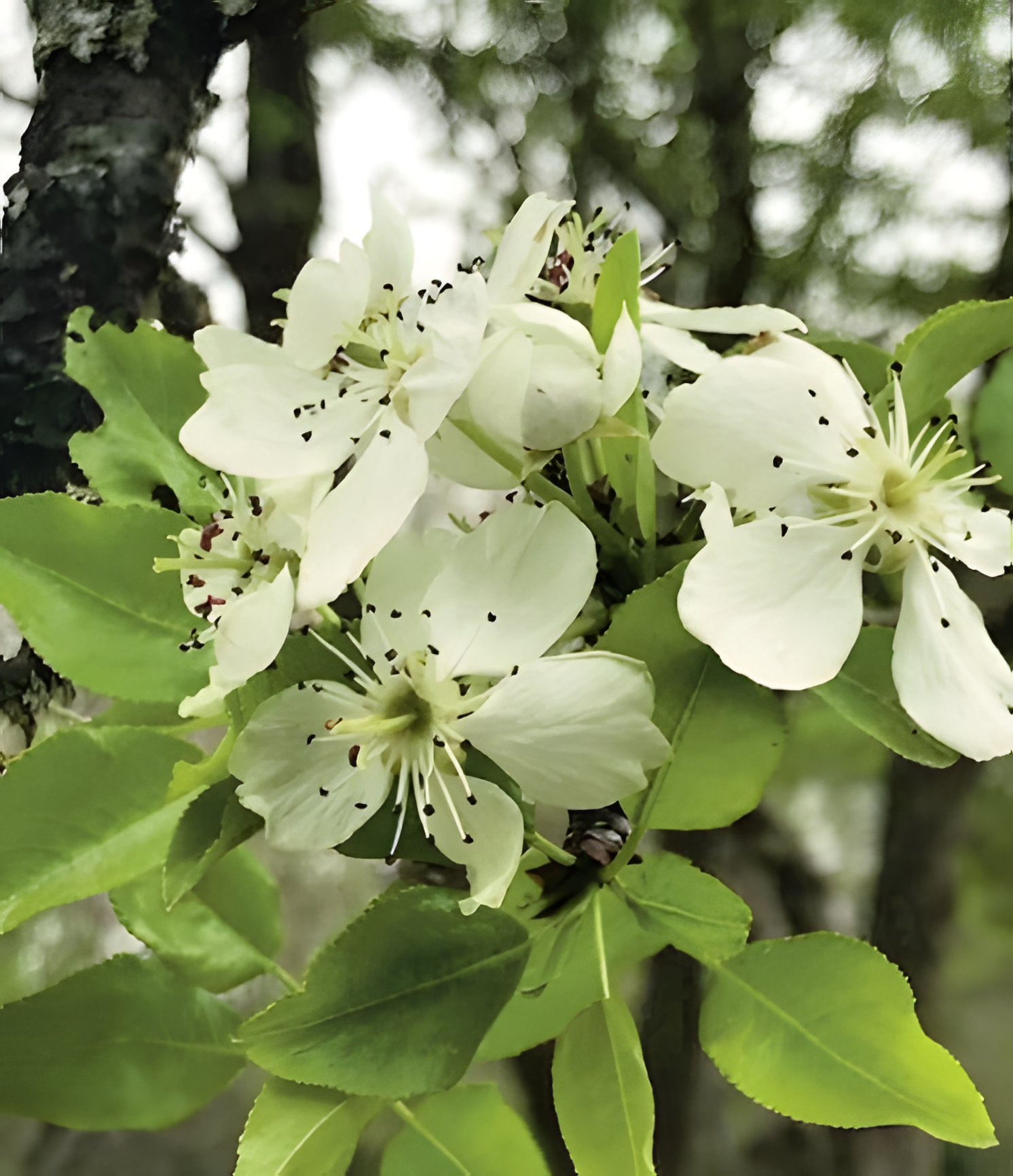
Flowers

== Taxonomy ==
The species was first discovered during botanical surveys as a large, locally common and morphologically distinct population of pears in the vicinity of Lake Maulazzo close to the municipalities of Militello Rosmarino and Alcara li Fusi, at ca.1400 m altitude in the Nebrodi Mountains, and was subsequently described by University of Palermo botanists Francesco Raimondo, Gianniantonio Domina and Giuseppe Venturella, in 2022. The research team around Raimondo is also responsible for the description of the whitebeams Aria madoniensis, A. busambarensis, A. meridionalis and A. phitosiana, as well as that of the wild apple Malus crescimannoi and the four other endemic pears, all from Sicily. The species' epiphet honours Franco Pedrotti, botanist and professor emeritus at the University of Camerino.

Pyrus pedrottiana can be distinguished from other pears on the island by a number of characteristics, some of which are taxonomically important. In contrast to the wild pear (P. pyraster), which is otherwise quite similar, the calyx is persistent in P. pedrottiana. This feature also distinguishes the species from the almond-leaved pear (P. spinosa). The persistent calyx is shared with Ciancio's pear (P. ciancioi) and the Val Demone pear (P. vallis-demonis), which are endemic to the same area, but differ in leaf, fruit and floral morphology, as well as in growth form.

== Distribution and ecology ==
Pyrus pedrottiana is only known to occur in an area of about 1,000 hectares within the Nebrodi Regional Park. Within this area, however, it is relatively common, occurring singly or in groups of several, especially in clearings. It grows between 1,300 and 1,500 m atitude, where it is associated with Turkey oak (Quercus cerris), hawthorns (Crataegus monogyna, C. laciniata), almond-leaved pear (P. spinosa), European wild apple (Malus sylvestris), spurge laurel (Daphne laureola), roses (Rosa canina, Rosa pulverulenta), Bramble (Rubus hirtus), and butcher's broom (Ruscus aculeatus), with herbaceous species including milkwort (Polygala aff. preslii), tuberous comfrey (Symphytum tuberosum subsp. angustifolium), common bird's-foot trefoil (Lotus corniculatus subsp. corniculatus), branched asphodel (Asphodelus ramosus subsp. ramosus), rock thyme (Clinopodium alpinum subsp. nebrodense), slender wood violet (Viola reichenbachiana), crested dog's tail (Cynosurus cristatus), red bartsia (Odontites vernus subsp. serotinus), plume thistle (Cirsium vallis-demonii subsp. vallis-demonii), brown knapweed (Centaurea jacea subsp. jacea), hop clover (Medicago lupulina), buck's-horn plantain (Plantago coronopus subsp. cupanii), red clover (Trifolium pratense subsp. pratense), white clover (T. repens), southern bugle (Ajuga iva subsp. iva), European daisy (Bellis perennis), tor-grass (Brachypodium pinnatum), grape hyacinth (Muscari commutatum), Roman dactylorhiza (Dactylorhiza romana subsp. markusii), Sinapis pubescens, pink shepherd's-purse (Capsella rubella), common brighteyes (Reichardia picroides), flatweed (Hypochoeris radicata), and beaked hawk's-beard (Crepis vesicaria).

== Status ==
Although P. pedrottiana occupies a very narrow distribution, it is locally common, with an estimated total population of 5,000 individuals.
