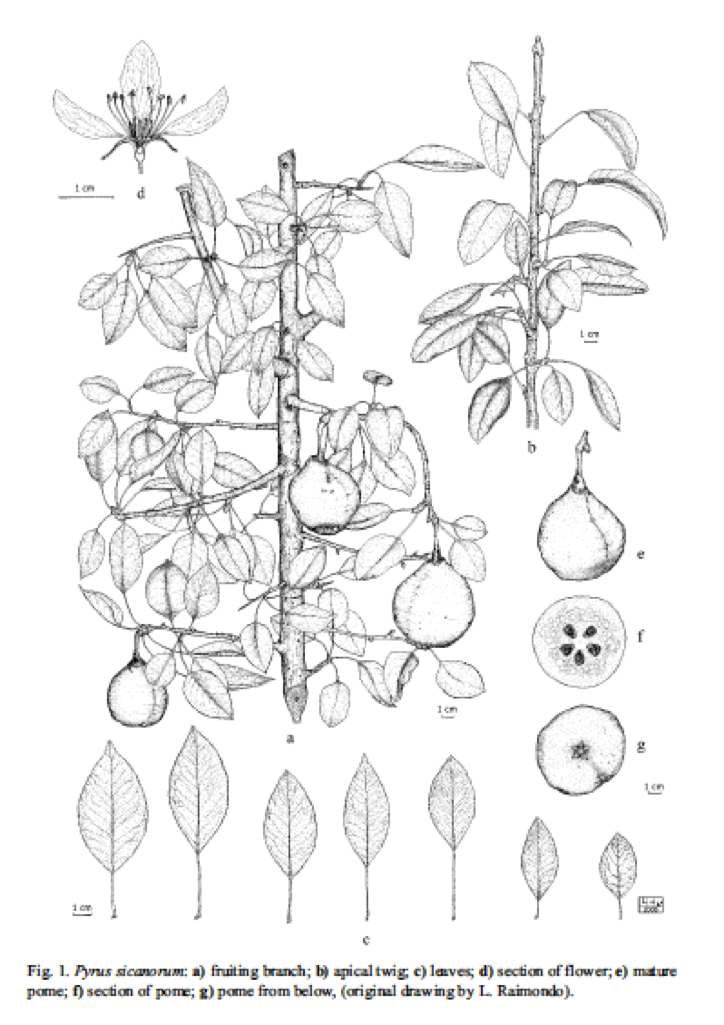

Conservation status
- Least Concern (IUCN 3.1)

Scientific classification
- Kingdom: Plantae
- Clade: Tracheophytes
- Clade: Angiosperms
- Clade: Eudicots
- Clade: Rosids
- Order: Rosales
- Family: Rosaceae
- Genus: Pyrus
- Species: P. sicanorum

Binomial name
- Pyrus sicanorum Raimondo, Schicchi & P.Marino

= Pyrus sicanorum =

Species of flowering plant

Pyrus sicanorum, the Pero dei Monti Sicano, is a species of pear in the rose family Rosaceae, that is native to central western Sicily. It is, together with P. ciancioi, P. pedrottiana, P. vallis-demonis and P. castribonensis, one of five pear species endemic to the island, and was described in 2006.

== Taxonomy ==
The species was described by a team of Palermo University botanists around Francesco Raimondo as part of an effort to systematise the rosaceous trees on the island which also led to the description of the whitebeams Aria madoniensis, A. busambarensis, A. meridionalis and A. phitosiana, the wild apple Malus crescimannoi, and the abovementioned four other species of pear. The species is named after the Sicani Mountains, the species' locus classicus. Of the pear species found growing wild in Sicily, P. sicanorum appears to be most closely related to the common pear (Pyrus communis subsp. communis), and its origin seems to be linked to cultivation. It is classified in subgenus Pyrus.

== Description ==
Pyrus sicanorum is a medium-sized deciduous species of tree with an erect and slender habit and ascending, spiny branches. The leaves are lanceolate and shiny, with a leaf length to width of ratio between 1.5 and 2.8 (<1.5 in P. communis subsp. pyraster). The white, insect-pollinated flowers appear in corymbs of 5-7 from the end of March to mid-April. The fruits are large, at 3.5-6 × 4-5.6 cm, green-yellowish and sometimes reddish on one side.

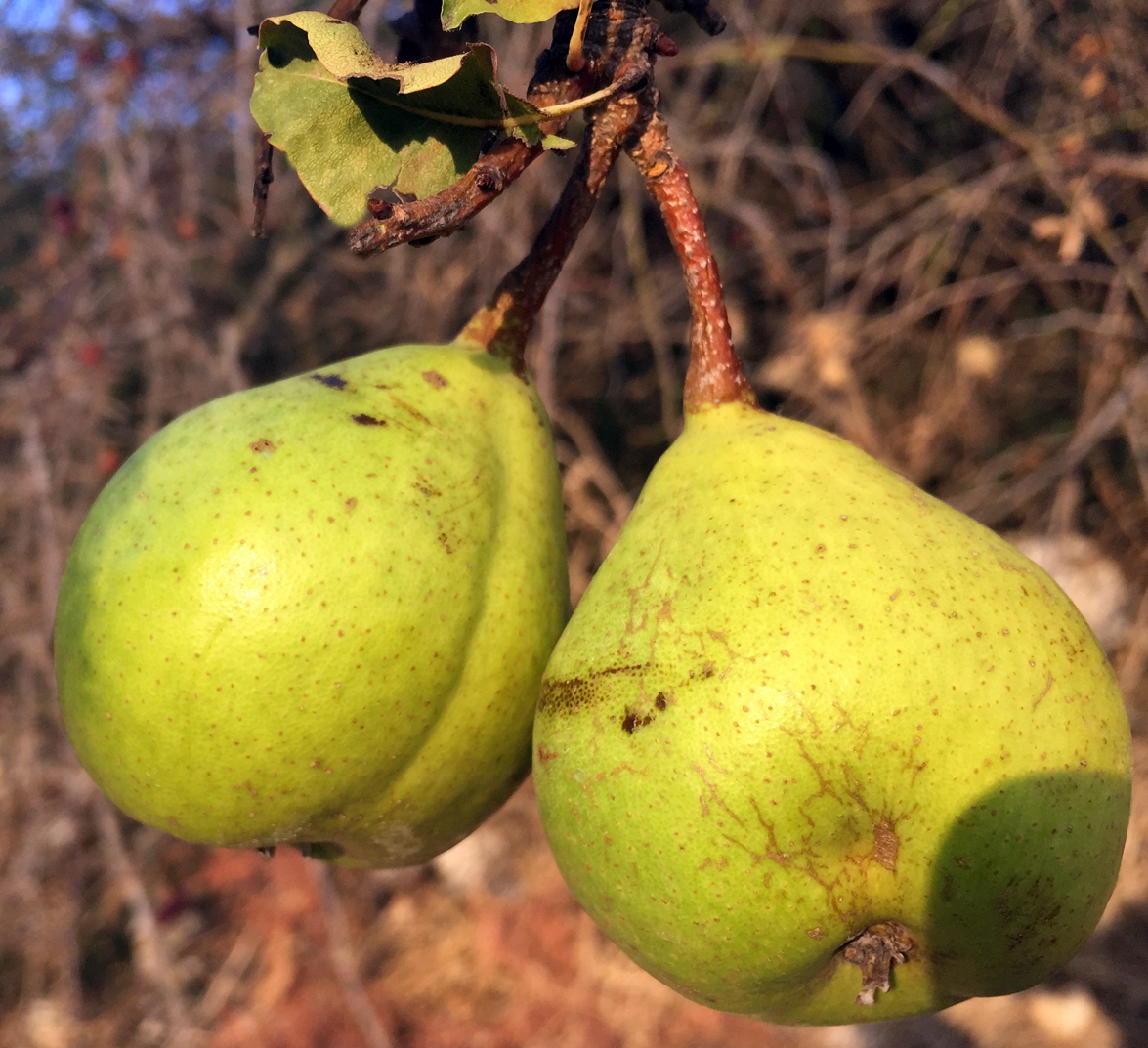
Ripe fruits

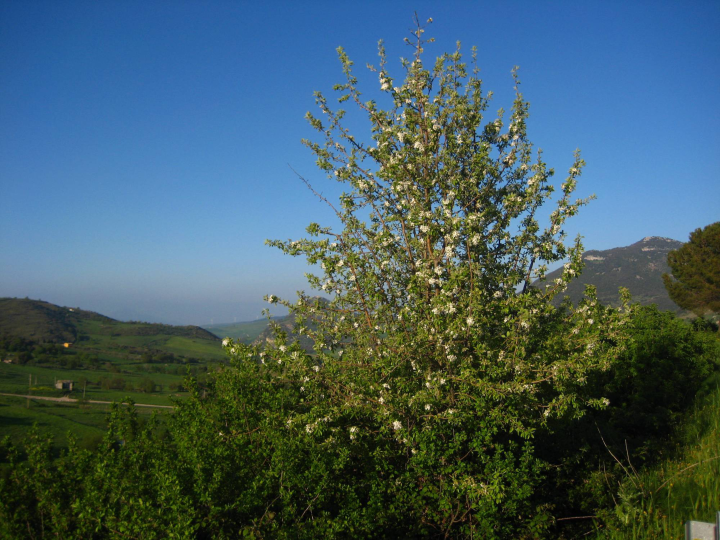
Habit

== Distribution and ecology ==
Pyrus sicanorum occurs in the Sicani Mountains of central-western Sicily, where it has been identified between Filaga and Prizzi (Palermo Province), near Monte delle Rose (Bivona, Agrigento Province) and in the Rifesi Woods, close to Palazzo Adriano and Burgio. The species grows in shrublands and mesophilic downy oak woodland margins on carbonate bedrock between 750 and 1300 m.a.s. together with wild asparagus (Asparagus acutifolius), common hawthorn (Crataegus monogyna), Albanian spurge (Euphorbia characias), Etruscan honeysuckle (Lonicera etrusca), coral peony (Paeonia mascula subsp. russoi), blackthorn (Prunus spinosa), dog rose (Rosa canina), evergreen rose (R. sempervirens), wild madder (Rubia peregrina), elmleaf blackberry (Rubus ulmifolius), butcher's broom (Ruscus aculeatus), common bindweed (Smilax aspera), milkwort (Polygala preslii) and bellevalia (Bellevalia dubia).
