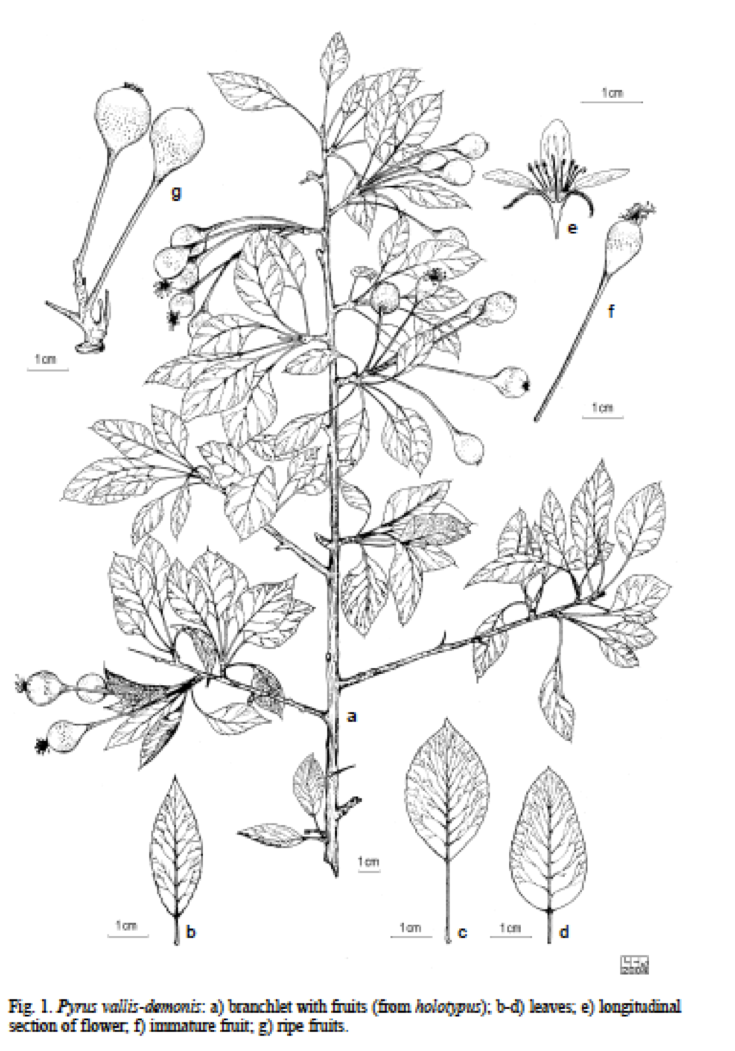

Conservation status
- Data Deficient (IUCN 3.1)

Scientific classification
- Kingdom: Plantae
- Clade: Tracheophytes
- Clade: Angiosperms
- Clade: Eudicots
- Clade: Rosids
- Order: Rosales
- Family: Rosaceae
- Genus: Pyrus
- Species: P. vallis-demonis

Binomial name
- Pyrus vallis-demonis Raimondo & Schicchi

= Pyrus vallis-demonis =

Species of flowering plant

Pyrus vallis-demonis, the Pero di Val Demone, is a species of pear in the rose family Rosaceae, native to northeastern Sicily. It is one of five endemic pear species that have been described from the island since 2004, together with P. ciancioi, P. castribonensis, P. sicanorum and P. pedrottiana. It is placed in subgenus Pyrus.

== Taxonomy ==
The species was described by University of Palermo botanists Francesco Raimondo and Rosario Schicchi in 2004, as the first of five endemic pear species from the island. The research team around Raimondo is also responsible for the description of the whitebeams Aria madoniensis, A. busambarensis, A. meridionalis and A. phitosiana, as well as that of the wild apple Malus crescimannoi and the four other endemic pears. The species was named in reference to the Val Demone, the name historically applied to the northeastern third of Sicily, where the Nebrodi Mountains, the species' type locality, are located. Although Pyrus vallis-demonis is accepted as a valid species by Plants of the Wold Online (as of February 2025), some have contested its status, preferring to instead treat it as conspecific with the Afghan pear (P. pashia), which is otherwise distributed in southern Asia.

== Description and similar species ==
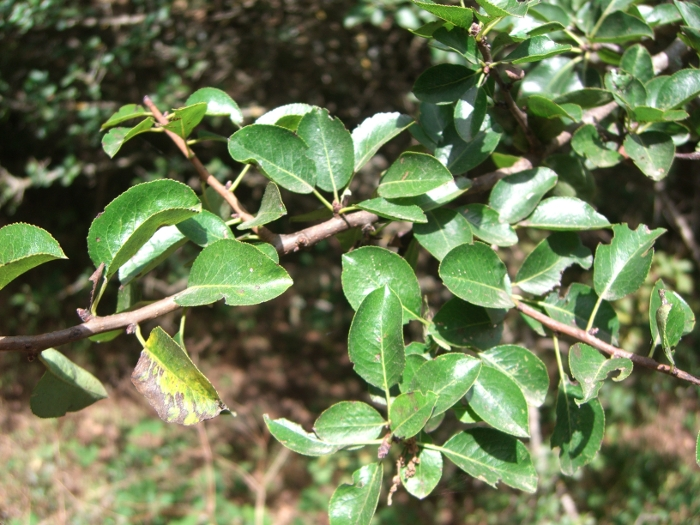
Leaves

Pyrus vallis-demonis grows as a medium-sized, spiny tree of up to 8 m height, with a conic crown. The leaves are ovate to lanceolate and 2,5-4,5 × 1,3-2,8 cm in size. The white flowers are grouped in corymbs of 12-18 between late April and early June. Morphologically it is very similar to the Plymouth pear (Pyrus cordata) in having hairy leaves of similar size and small fruits. In contrast to that species, however, the twigs of P. vallis-demonis are hairy, and the petioles (leaf stems) and peduncles (flower/fruit stalks) are longer.

== Distribution ==
Pyrus vallis-demonis is restricted to a limited area near Caronia in the Nebrodi Mountains, Messina Province, at altitudes between 1,300 and 1,480 m. It occurs on the margins of Turkey oak (Quercus cerris) (Note: It's unclear from the description whether this refers to Turkey oak or, potentially, Boccone Turkey oak.) woodlands on quartz arenite edaphic soils, in association with dog rose (Rosa canina), elmleaf blackberry (Rubus ulmifolius), blackthorn (Prunus spinosa), butcher's broom (Ruscus aculeatus), spurge-laurel (Daphne laureola), European wild apple (Malus sylvestris), field maple (Acer campestre) and European ash (Fraxinus excelsior).
