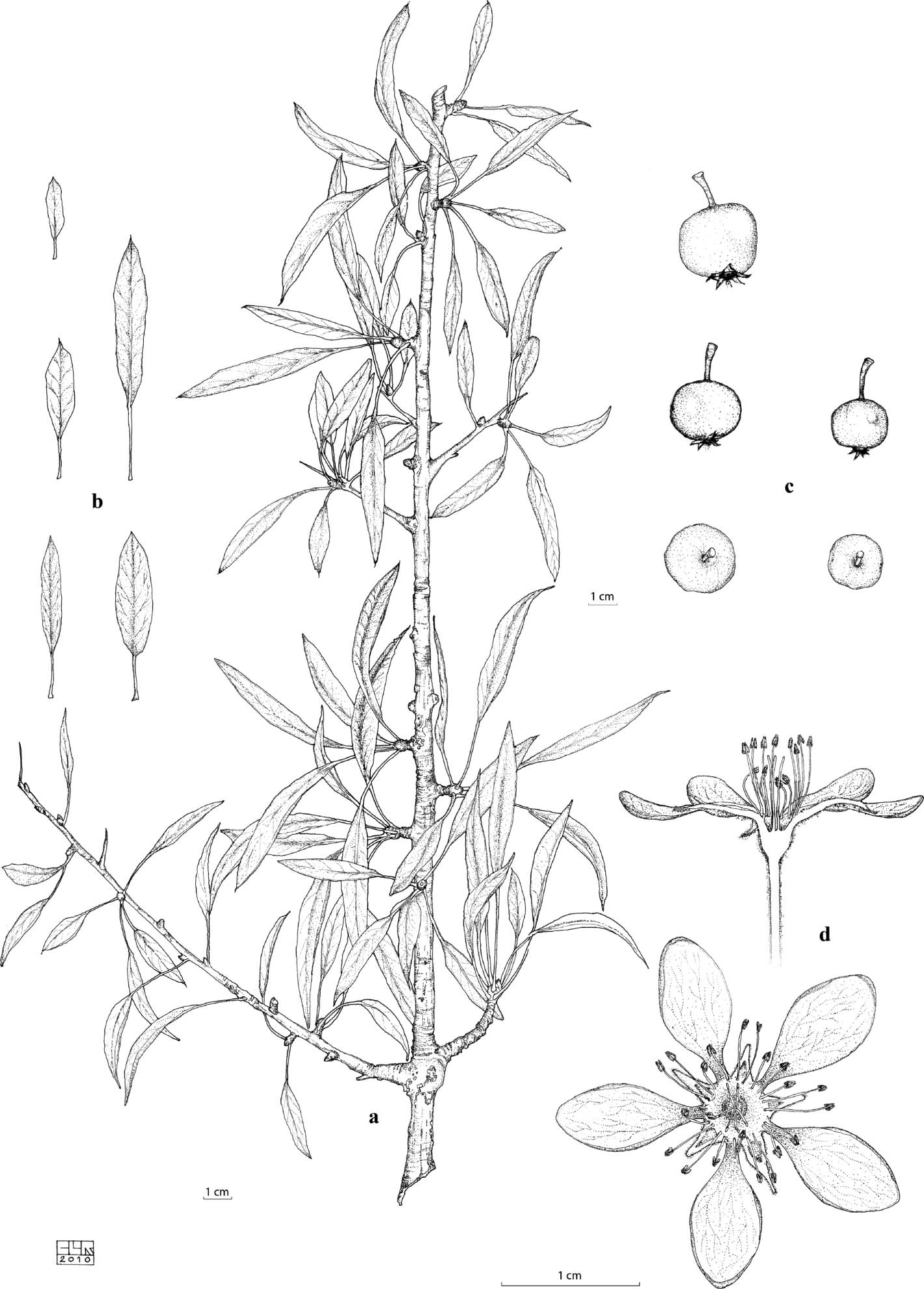

Conservation status
- Data Deficient (IUCN 3.1)

Scientific classification
- Kingdom: Plantae
- Clade: Tracheophytes
- Clade: Angiosperms
- Clade: Eudicots
- Clade: Rosids
- Order: Rosales
- Family: Rosaceae
- Genus: Pyrus
- Species: P. ciancioi

Binomial name
- Pyrus ciancioi P.Marino, G.Castellano, Raimondo & Spadaro

= Pyrus ciancioi =

Species of flowering plant

Pyrus ciancioi, the pero di Ciancio or Ciancio's pear, is a species of pear in the rose family Rosaceae. It is, together with P. sicanorum, P. vallis-demonis, P. castribonensis and P. pedrottiana, one of five pear species endemic to Sicily. Having been described only in 2012, only about 15 mature individuals are known.

== Taxonomy ==
Pyrus ciancioi is morphologically similar to P. communis, P. pyraster, P. spinosa and P. sicanorum in having a frequently persistent calyx, indicating a close evolutionary affinity. It was described by a team of researchers in 2012, and named after the Italian scientist Orazio Ciancio.

== Description ==
Pyrus ciancioi is a spiny tree of more than 5 m (16 ft) height. The leaves are lanceolate and 3.2–6 centimetres (1.3–2.4 in) long, with entire to slightly serrated margins and 1.2–2.5 centimetres (0.47–0.98 in) long petioles. Young leaves are more strongly pubescent on the underside than older leaves. The white flowers appear in corymbs in early April. The fruit is small (2–2.5 centimetres (0.79–0.98 in)) and brownish, and the calyx often persists.

== Distribution and ecology ==
The species is known only from the Nebrodi Mountains in northeast Sicily, near the town of Floresta (Province of Messina). It occurs in hedges on quartz-arenite soils.

== See also ==
Malus crescimannoi – an endemic species of apple from the same locality
