= Aria collina =

- Flowering Aria collina in the Franconian Jura

Conservation status
- Least Concern (IUCN 3.1)

Scientific classification
- Kingdom: Plantae
- Clade: Tracheophytes
- Clade: Angiosperms
- Clade: Eudicots
- Clade: Rosids
- Order: Rosales
- Family: Rosaceae
- Genus: Aria
- Species: A. collina

Binomial name
- Aria collina (M.Lepší, P.Lepší & N.Mey.) Sennikov & Kurtto
- It is native to the Czech Republic, Germany, and Austria

Synonyms
- Pyrus collina (M.Lepší, P.Lepší & N.Mey.) M.F.Fay & Christenh.; Sorbus collina M.Lepší, P.Lepší & N.Mey.

Species of tree in the family Rosaceae

Aria collina, the Hill whitebeam is a mostly apomictic species of tree in the family Rosaceae native to the Czech Republic, Germany, and Austria.

== Description ==
Aria collina in the Franconian Jura

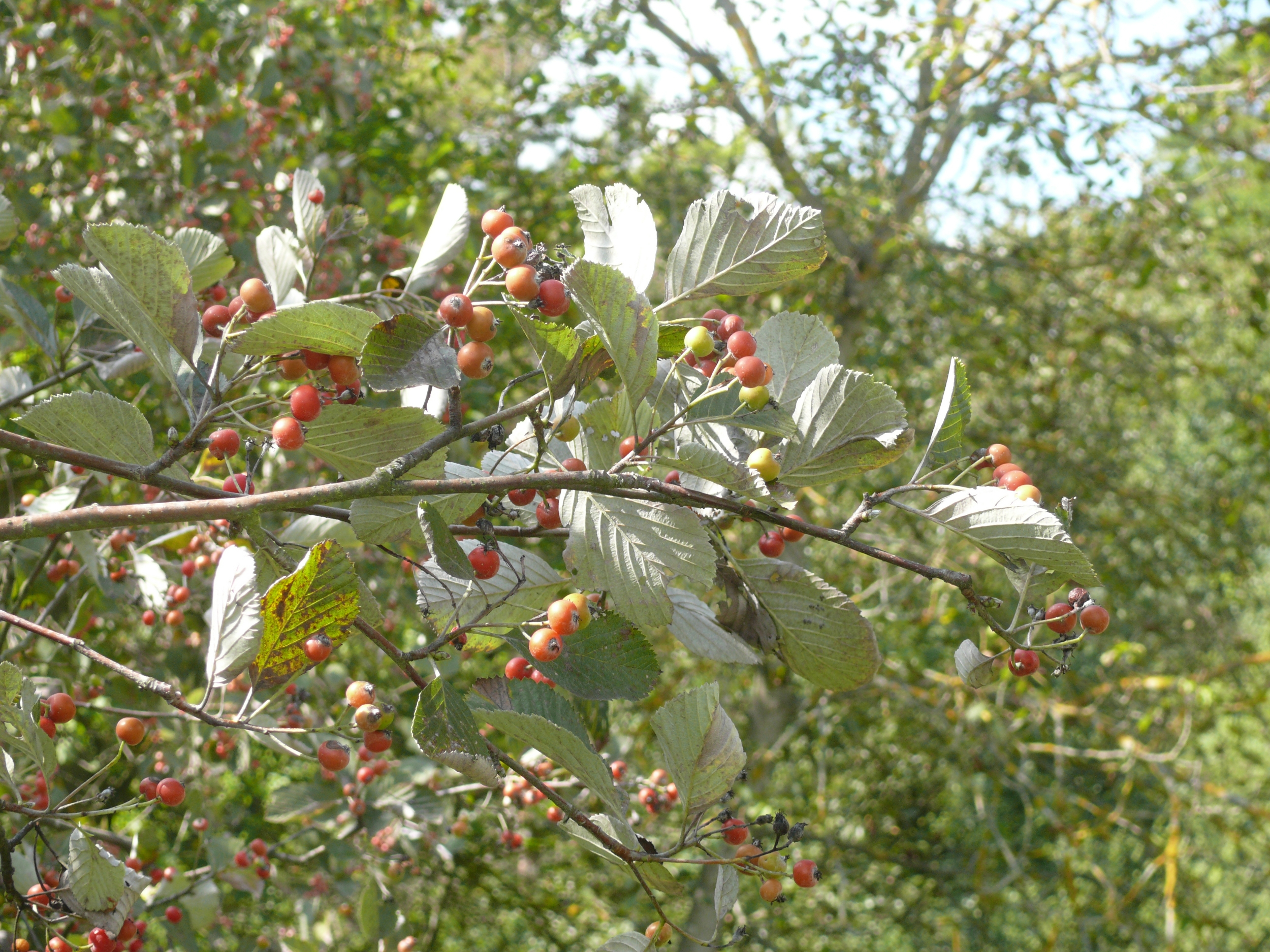
Fruiting Aria collina

=== Vegetative characteristics ===
Aria collina is a deciduous, 3–10(–18) m tall shrub or tree with coriaceous, dentate, circular to ovate, 5–9 cm long, and (5.7–)7–7.5(–9.8) cm wide leaves with an obtuse apex or a very short pointed tip. The leaf base is cuneate or rounded. The lower half of the lamina has an entire margin, and the upper half is dentate. The adaxial leaf surface is initially densely pubescent, and later glabrescent. The abaxial leaf surface is pubescent with white hairs. The leaves have 7–9(–10) lateral veins. The grey bark is initially smooth and later becomes fissured, especially towards the base of the trunk. The thick branches are grey-brown and smooth. The twigs are thick and the new growth is initially tomentose, later becoming glabrous. The buds are ovoid and pointed.

=== Generative characteristics ===
The dense, arched, 6 cm wide, and 6 cm tall, pedunculate corymb with tomentose branches bears white, actinomorphic flowers. The sepals are triangular, pointed or acuminate, and the white, broadly elliptical petals are (6–)6.5–7.5(–8) mm long. The flower has 20 stamens and 2 styles. The infructescence bears numerous scarlet red, (10–)11–12(–13) mm long, and 1 cm wide globose accessory fruits with a persistent calyx and few large lenticels. The fruit is pubescent at the base and at the apex, but is glabrous in the middle. The mesocarp is heterogeneous and the endocarp is cartilaginous. It is mostly apomictic, but some seeds are produced sexually. The seeds are brownish-grey.

=== Cytology ===
The chromosome count is 2n = 4x = 68. It is tetraploid. The genetic diversity is higher than expected for an apomictic species. Aria collina consists of several clones and a high number of unique genotypes, but the genetic differences are small and the different genotypes are morphologically uniform. The variability of genotypes is caused by the accumulation of mutations, different polyploidization events of multiple origins, backcrossing, and remnant sexuality.

== Taxonomy ==
It was first described as Sorbus collina M.Lepší, P.Lepší & N.Mey. by Martin Lepší, Petr Lepší, and Norbert Meyer in 2015. It was moved to the genus Aria (Pers.) J.Jacq. ex Host as Aria collina (M.Lepší, P.Lepší & N.Mey.) Sennikov & Kurtto by Alexander Nikolaevitsch Sennikov and Arto Kurtto in 2017. The type specimen was collected by M. Lepší and P. Lepší in Nalžovické Podhájí (distr. Příbram), central Bohemia, Czech Republic on the 7th of August 2013. It has long been confused with Aria pannonica, Aria graeca, and Aria edulis.

=== Etymology ===
The specific epithet collina means growing on hills.

== Distribution and habitat ==
It is native to the Czech Republic, Germany, and Austria, (Note: A record reported from Hungary was determined to be different from the other Aria collina populations.) where it occurs in natural or semi natural, open or semi-open habitats such as cliffs, screes, steppes, woodland or gaps and clearings, as well as in pine or spruce plantations at elevations of 220–800 m above sea level. It occurs both in areas with acidic or base-rich bedrock.

== Conservation ==
Aria collina is a species of least concern with a large, but declining population of 10000–20000 trees occurring on a large area. It is a rare and threatened species in Germany. In the Czech Republic, it is categorised as vulnerable species. In the Czech Republic and in Germany, it doesn't have special legal protection. It is cultivated in the ex situ collection of Dendrologická zahrada Průhonice, in the Arboretum Křtiny, and in the Arboretum of the Warsaw University of Life Sciences in Rogów.

== Uses ==
It has been planted as an urban tree in Třebíč and Strakonice.
