= Trearie Lake =

Lake in Sicily, Italy

Lago Trearie
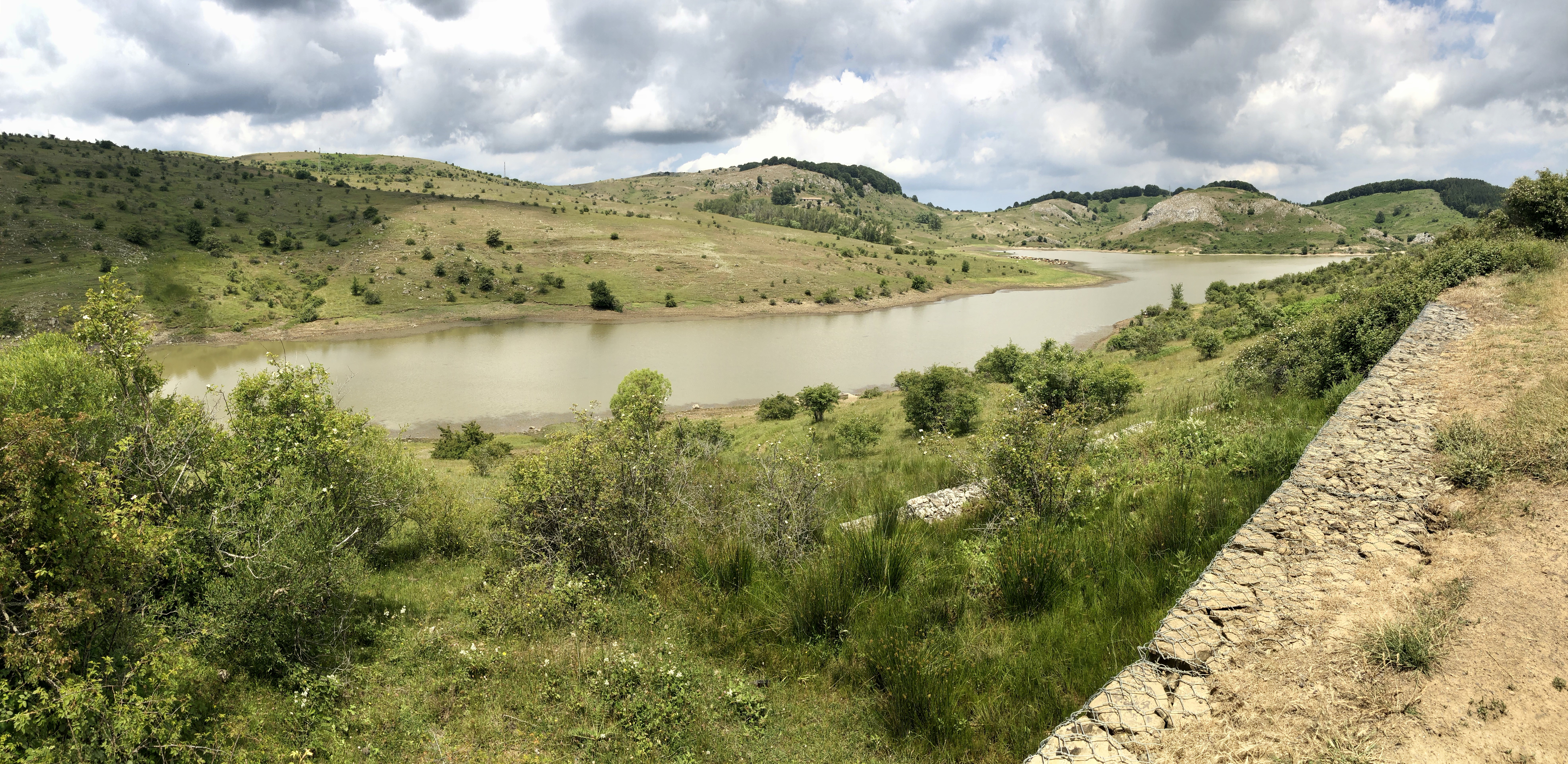

- Location within Sicily
- Location: Province of Catania, Sicily
- Coordinates: 37.953214°N 14.840354°E
- Basin countries: Italy
- Surface elevation: 1,435 m (4,708 ft)

Lago Trearie is a small lake in the Parco Naturale dei Nebrodi in the Province of Catania, northeast of Sicily island, Italy.

It is on the trail to Catafurco Waterfalls.
