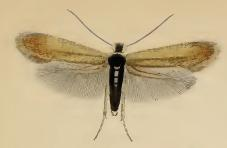

Scientific classification
- Kingdom: Animalia
- Phylum: Arthropoda
- Clade: Pancrustacea
- Class: Insecta
- Order: Lepidoptera
- Family: Nepticulidae
- Genus: Stigmella
- Species: S. minusculella

Binomial name
- Stigmella minusculella (Herrich-Schaffer, 1855)

Synonyms
- Nepticula minusculella Herrich-Schaffer, 1855; Nepticula chalybeia Braun, 1914; Nepticula embonella Klimesch, 1978; Stigmella chalybeia (Braun, 1914)

= Stigmella minusculella =

Species of moth

Stigmella minusculella is a moth of the family Nepticulidae. It is found from Denmark and Latvia to the Pyrenees, Corsica, Italy and Crete, and from Great Britain to Ukraine. It is also present in North America, where it is found in Ohio, New Jersey and Ontario.

Mine

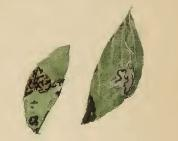
Mined pieces of pear leaves

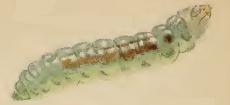
Larva

The wingspan is 5–6 mm. There are two to three generations per year.

The larvae feed on Pyrus amygdaliformis, Pyrus communis, Pyrus elaeagrifolia and Pyrus spinosa. They mine the leaves of their host plant.
