= Aria pannonica =

Conservation status
- Vulnerable (IUCN 3.1)

Scientific classification
- Kingdom: Plantae
- Clade: Tracheophytes
- Clade: Angiosperms
- Clade: Eudicots
- Clade: Rosids
- Order: Rosales
- Family: Rosaceae
- Genus: Aria
- Species: A. pannonica

Binomial name
- Aria pannonica (Kárpáti) Sennikov & Kurtto
- It is endemic to the Transdanubian Mountains, Hungary

Synonyms
- Pyrus pannonica (Kárpáti) M.F.Fay & Christenh.; Sorbus aria f. pseudaria Soó; Sorbus pannonica Kárpáti

Species of tree in the family Rosaceae

Aria pannonica is an apomictic species of tree in the family Rosaceae endemic to the Transdanubian Mountains in northwestern Hungary. It is vulnerable to extinction.

== Description ==
=== Vegetative characteristics ===
Aria pannonica is a shrub or tree with grey bark and brownish grey twigs bearing dark green, simple, semi-rigid, leaves. The brown young shoots bear numerous white lenticels. The ovoid, acute buds have scales with sparsely tomentose margins. The narrowly elliptic-obovate, lobed leaves of the short, sterile twigs with a serrate margin are 7–11 cm long, and 4.5–7 cm wide. The base is cuneate. The leaf has 9– 11 lateral veins. The leaves of the short, fertile twigs are broader and more dentate. The adaxial leaf surface is glabrous and the whitish abaxial leaf surface is tomentose. The petiole is 10–15(–20) mm long.

=== Generative characteristics ===
The compact, corymbose inflorescence has tomentose branchlets. The triangular sepals are densely tomentose on both surfaces. The white, elliptic to broadly elliptic petals are 5–7 mm long, and 3.5–4.5 mm wide. The 20 stamens with whitish filaments have yellow to slightly pinkish anthers. The globose or subglobose, red, 10–13 mm wide fruit bears numerous small lenticels. Flowering occurs from April to May, and fruiting occurs in September to October.

=== Cytology ===
The chromosome count is 2n = 3x = 51. It is triploid.

== Taxonomy ==
It was first described as Sorbus pannonica Kárpáti by Zoltan Kárpáti in 1944. It was moved to the genus Aria (Pers.) J.Jacq. ex Host as Aria pannonica (Kárpáti) Sennikov & Kurtto by Alexander Nikolaevitsch Sennikov and Arto Kurtto in 2017. The name Sorbus pannonica had been misapplied to several other species, such as Aria collina.

=== Etymology ===
The specific epithet pannonica means of Pannonia, a former Roman province in what is now Western Hungary and Nothern Croatia.

== Distribution and habitat ==
It is endemic to the Transdanubian Mountains in northwestern Hungary, where it occurs in an area of 757 km^{2} growing on rocky slopes and in mixed karst forests at elevations of 250–400 m above sea level. The earlier reports of Aria pannonica in countries apart from Hungary are incorrect.

== Conservation ==
Aria pannonica is a vulnerable species with a small population of 250-1000 trees. It is locally common. In the Red List of threatened tree and shrub species of Hungary, it is also categorised as vulnerable. It is grown in several ex situ conservation collections, but it is unclear whether these cultivated plants represent the true Aria pannonica s. str.
