= Rhamphospermum labasii =

Scientific classification
- Kingdom: Plantae
- Clade: Tracheophytes
- Clade: Angiosperms
- Clade: Eudicots
- Clade: Rosids
- Order: Brassicales
- Family: Brassicaceae
- Genus: Rhamphospermum
- Species: R. labasii

Binomial name
- Rhamphospermum labasii (Maire) Al-Shehbaz

Synonyms
- Trachystoma labasii Maire

Species of plant

Rhamphospermum labasii is a species of flowering plant in the family Brassicaceae, native to Morocco. It differs from other members of its clade by its seed shape and arrangement.
