= Rhamphospermum =

Scientific classification
- Kingdom: Plantae
- Clade: Embryophytes
- Clade: Tracheophytes
- Clade: Angiosperms
- Clade: Eudicots
- Clade: Rosids
- Order: Brassicales
- Family: Brassicaceae
- Tribe: Brassiceae
- Genus: Rhamphospermum; Andrz. ex Besser

Species
- See text

Genus of flowering plants

Rhamphospermum is a genus of flowering plants in the family Brassicaceae. It was revived in 2021, in a "long overdue" taxonomic revision of the Brassicaceae.

== Species ==
The following species are accepted:

- Rhamphospermum arvense (L.) Andrz. ex Besser
- Rhamphospermum labasii (Maire) Al-Shehbaz
- Rhamphospermum nigrum (L.) Al-Shehbaz
- Rhamphospermum pubescens (L.) Al-Shehbaz
