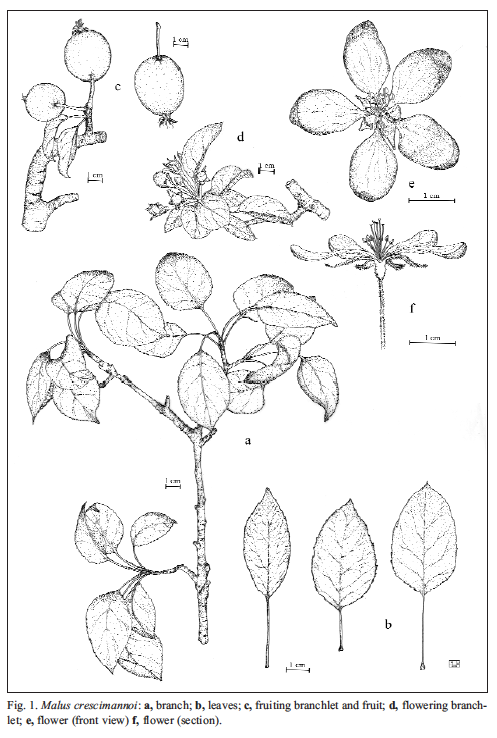

Conservation status
- Data Deficient (IUCN 3.1)

Scientific classification
- Kingdom: Plantae
- Clade: Embryophytes
- Clade: Tracheophytes
- Clade: Angiosperms
- Clade: Eudicots
- Clade: Rosids
- Order: Rosales
- Family: Rosaceae
- Genus: Malus
- Species: M. crescimannoi

Binomial name
- Malus crescimannoi Raimondo

= Malus crescimannoi =

Species of flowering plant

Malus crescimannoi, also known as the Raimondo apple, is a species of apple in the rose family, Rosaceae. Native to the island of Sicily, it was formally described only in 2008, making it one of the most recently described species of tree in Europe. Whether the species is a remnant of a preglacial diversity of apples in Europe or a distinctive race of European wild apple is at present unknown.

== Description ==
It is a small to medium-sized tree of up to 10 metres (33 ft) in size, that is distinguished from the European wild apple and the domestic apple by a combination of smaller flowers, more oval leaves and small (2.5 to 4 centimetres or 1 to 1 1/2 inches in diameter) pomes that are usually longer than wide. The flowers appear in corymbs in April to May, with petals that are pink to purple in colour. The apple fruits ripen in October to November. The leaves are hairy with long petioles. The twigs are weakly thorny.

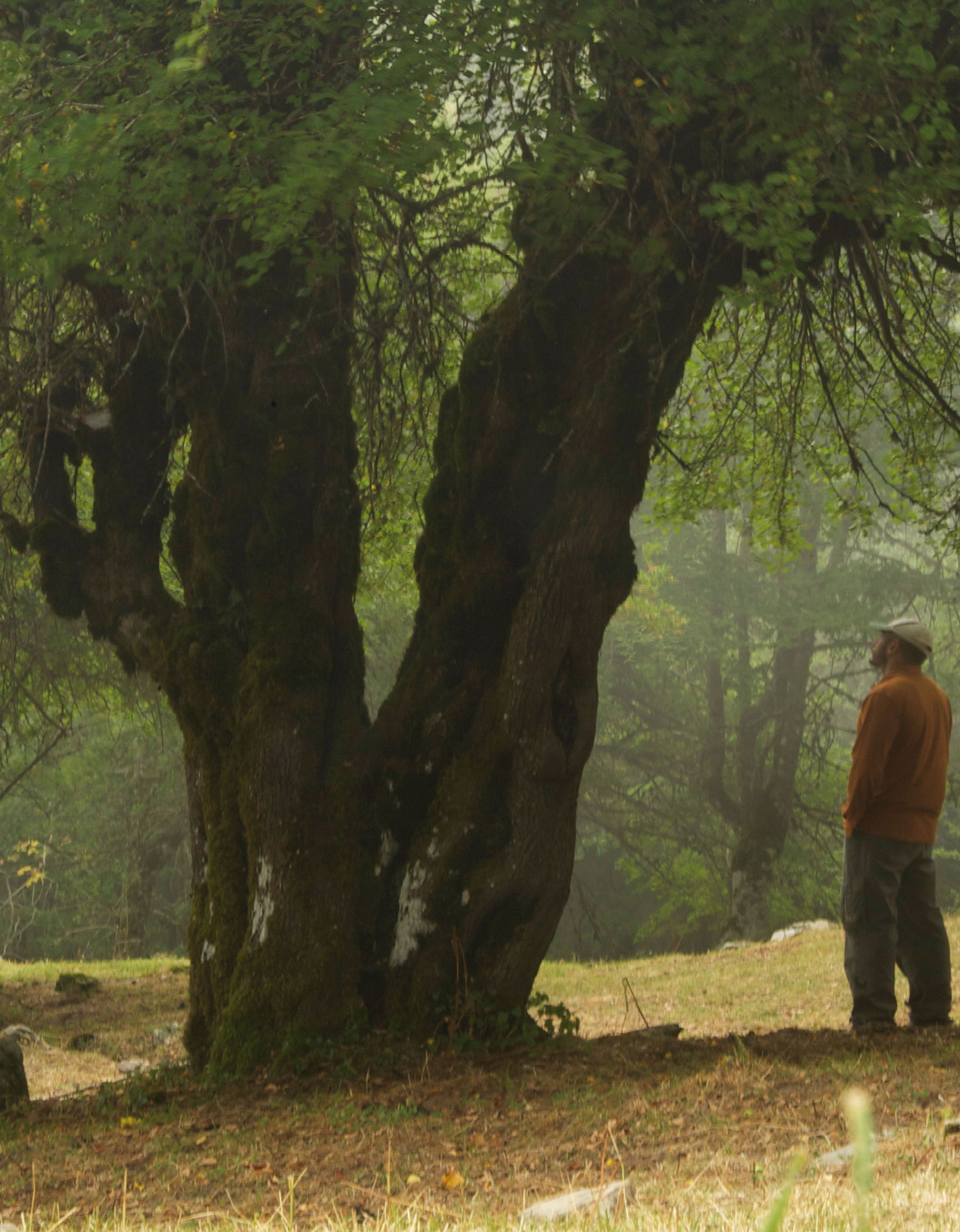
Mature tree

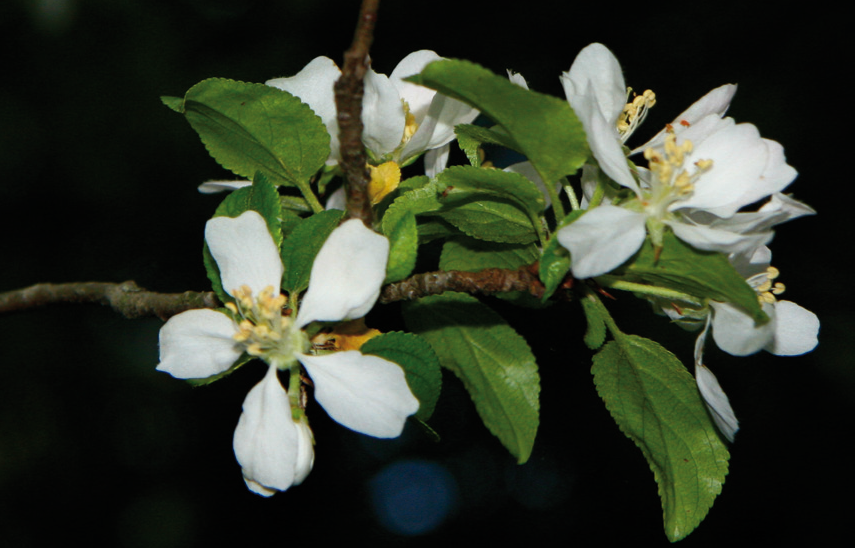
Flowers

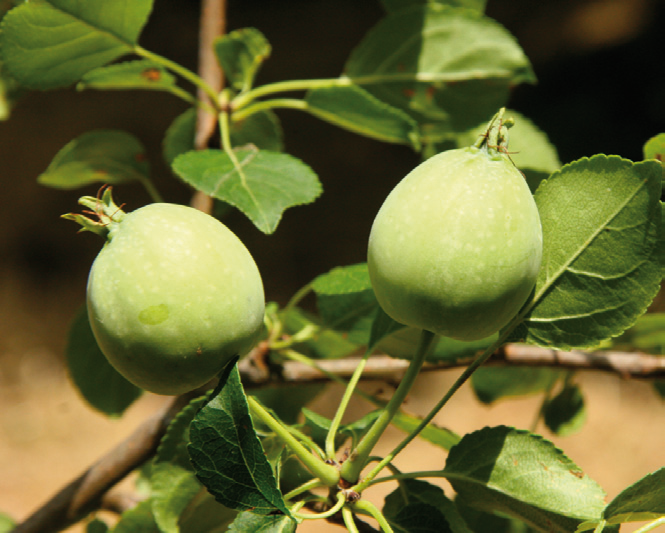
Fruits

== Taxonomy ==
Although formally described in 2008, the species was recognised as different from other local apple populations much earlier. Further investigation by botanist Francesco Raimondo then demonstrated that the population is relatively uniform in its characteristics and distinct from other populations, which led to its formal description as a distinct species. Nonetheless, the species is clearly closely related to both the domestic apple (Malus domestica) and the European wild apple (M. sylvestris), and could still turn out to be a distinctive local race of the latter. The species epiphet honours Francesco Giulio Crescimanno, dendrologist and professor at the University of Palermo.

== Distribution and ecology ==
The species is endemic to Sicily, a characteristic it shares with other Sicilian woody plants such as the Sicilian fir (Abies nebrodensis), Mount Etna broom (Genista aetnensis) and Sicilian zelkove (Zelkova sicula). It is also the only species of apple endemic to Italy, the other two wild species (M. sylvestris and M. florentina) being more widely distributed in Europe. The species was originally described from the Nebrodi mountains near Floresta, but was more recently also identified in the Madonie Mountains. The area is recognised as the largest remaining area of Sicilian forest and is home to a number of endemic species. Malus crescimannoi occurs in plant communities dominated by oaks (Quercus cerris and Q. petraea) and European beech (Fagus sylvatica), alongside fellow medium-sized rosaceous species such as the chequer tree (Torminalis glaberrima), pears (Pyrus pyraster, P. spinosa, and P. ciancioi) and locally the closely related European crab apple, as well as hawthorns (Crataegus monogyna and C. orientalis), blackthorn (Prunus spinosa) and dog rose (Rosa canina). It can be a common member of these communities between 1,000 and 1,800 m (3,300 and 5,900 ft) in altitude.

== Conservation ==
The species is known from only two populations in two locations in the Sicilian Apennines of northern Sicily. The Italian Red List classifies it as near threatened, and it is also recognised as a threatened crop wild relative of the domestic apple.

== See also ==
- Malus trilobata – Lebanese wild apple
- Pyrus sicanorum – Pear species endemic to Sicily
