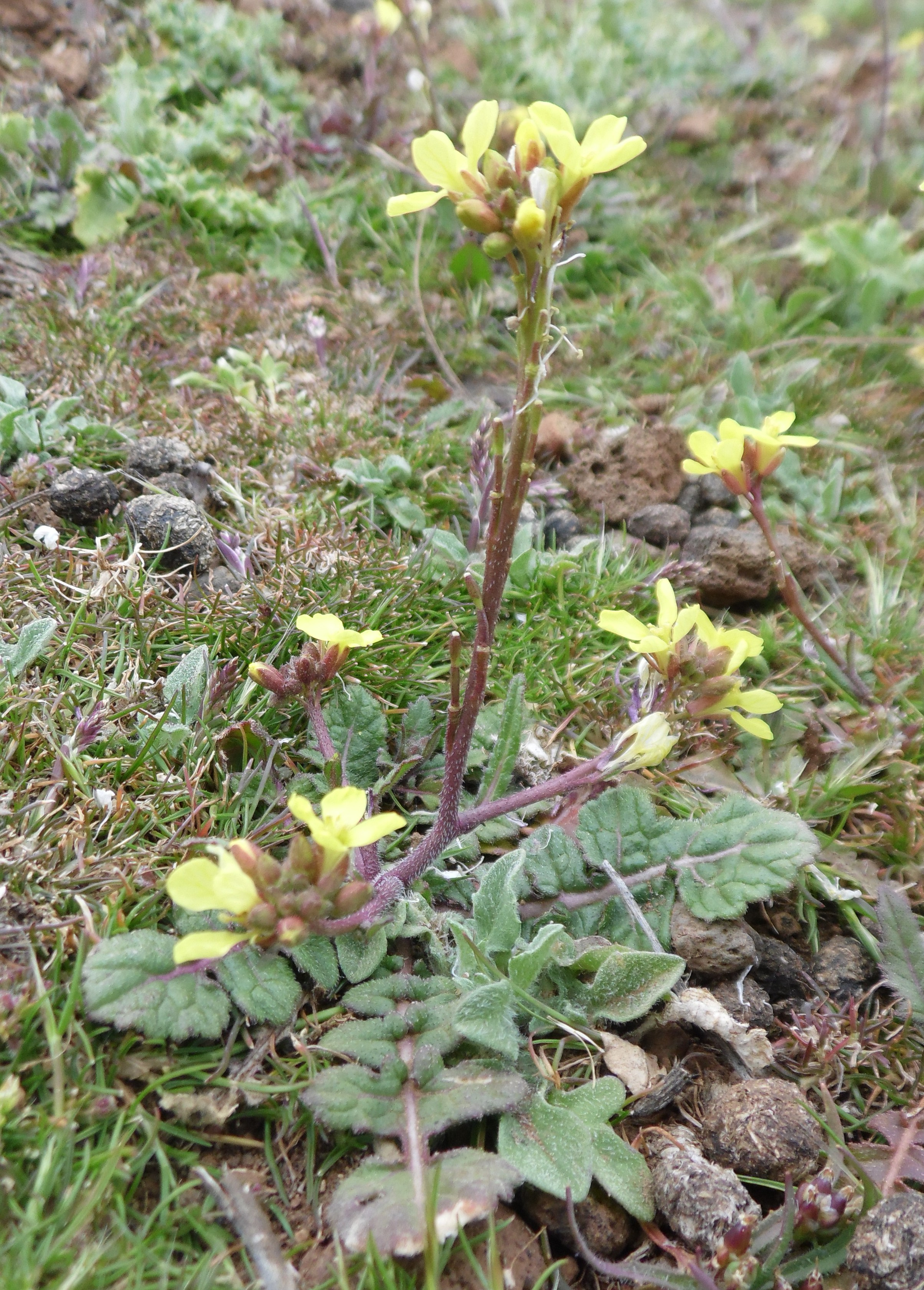
- Habit

Scientific classification
- Kingdom: Plantae
- Clade: Tracheophytes
- Clade: Angiosperms
- Clade: Eudicots
- Clade: Rosids
- Order: Brassicales
- Family: Brassicaceae
- Genus: Rhamphospermum
- Species: R. pubescens

Binomial name
- Rhamphospermum pubescens (L.) Al-Shehbaz

Synonyms
- List: Brassica palmensis Kuntze; Brassica pubescens (L.) Ardoino; Erucastrum pubescens (L.) Willk.; Heterocrambe aristidis Coss. & Durieu; Sinapidendron palmense (Kuntze) O.E.Schulz; Sinapis aristidis Pomel; Sinapis circinnata Desf.; Sinapis indurata Coss.; Sinapis pubescens L.; Sinapis pubescens subsp. aristidis (Pomel) Maire & Weiller; Sinapis pubescens var. brachyloba Coss.; Sinapis pubescens var. brevirostrata O.E.Schulz; Sinapis pubescens var. circinata Coss.; Sinapis pubescens var. cyrenaica Coss. & Daveau; Sinapis pubescens subsp. indurata (Coss.) Batt.; Sinapis pubescens subsp. serrata Huter, Porta & Rigo ex Arcang.; Sinapis pubescens var. tenuirostris Guss.; Sinapis serrata Huter, Porta & Rigo ex Fiori & Paol.

= Rhamphospermum pubescens =

Species of plant

Rhamphospermum pubescens (syn. Sinapis pubescens) is a species of flowering plant in the family Brassicaceae. It is native to the central Mediterranean; France, Italy, Sardinia, Sicily, Albania, Algeria, Tunisia, and Libya, and it has been introduced to Madeira and the Canary Islands. A perennial, its chromosome count is 2n = 18.
