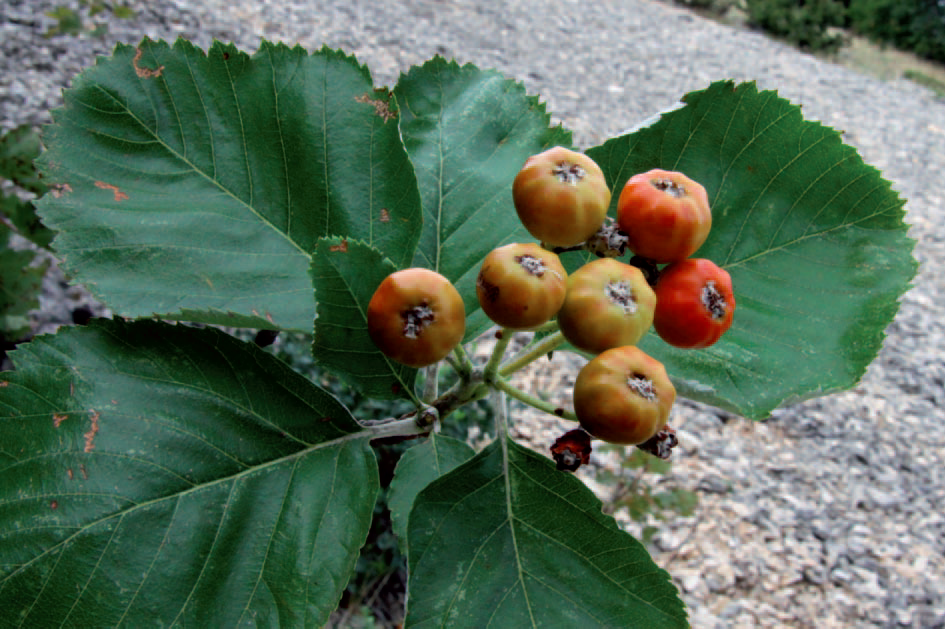
- Fruiting branch of Aria busambarensis

Conservation status
- Critically Endangered (IUCN 3.1)

Scientific classification
- Kingdom: Plantae
- Clade: Tracheophytes
- Clade: Angiosperms
- Clade: Eudicots
- Clade: Rosids
- Order: Rosales
- Family: Rosaceae
- Genus: Aria
- Species: A. busambarensis

Binomial name
- Aria busambarensis (G.Castellano, P.Marino, Raimondo & Spadaro) Sennikov & Kurtto
- It is endemic to northern Sicily, Italy

Synonyms
- Pyrus busambarensis (G.Castellano, P.Marino, Raimondo & Spadaro) M.F.Fay & Christenh.; Sorbus busambarensis G.Castellano, P.Marino, Raimondo & Spadaro

= Aria busambarensis =

Species of tree in the family Rosaceae

Aria busambarensis is a species of tree in the family Rosaceae endemic to northern Sicily, Italy. It is a very rare and critically endangered species.

== Description ==
Botanical illustration of Aria busambarensis

=== Vegetative characteristics ===
Aria busambarensis is a 3.5–7 m tall shrub or tree with an erect trunk and spreading branches. The shiny, smooth bark is brownish-grey. The glabrous, reddish-grey, smooth or wrinkled bark of young branches bears few oval, 0.4–0.7 mm long lenticels. The ovoid, tomentose, greenish-yellow to brownish, 5.7–10.5 mm long, and 2.6–4.1 mm wide buds have scales with a narrow, thin, dry, and membranous margin. The coriaceous, elliptic to rounded, or obovate, 6.5–7.2 cm long, and 5.7–6.6 cm wide leaves with a biserrate margin have 7–8 pairs of lateral veins. The leaf venation is craspedodromous. The apex is acute or acuminate, and the base is cuneate or rounded. The mostly glabrous adaxial leaf surface may be slightly hairy along the leaf veins, and the light grey, tomentose abaxial leaf surface has distinctly raised veins. The grey-tomentose petiole is 6–9 mm long, and 1.2–1.4 mm wide.

=== Generative characteristics ===
The corymbose, tomentose, few-flowered inflorescence bears 4–8 white flowers. The grey-tomentose hypanthium is turbinate. The triangular, tomentose, acute, patent, 2.3–2.7 mm long, and 2–2.5 mm wide sepals are deciduous or more rarely persistent. The white, patent, 5.9–7.2 mm long, and 4.5–4.8 mm wide petals are glabrous. The 20 stamens with glabrous, 8–11 mm long filaments have pink to yellowish anthers. The 2 free, 4–4.5 mm long styles are surrounded by dense, white, woolly hairs. The flower has 2 carpels. The globose or obovoid, ribbed, apically truncate and apically densely tomentose, red to reddish-orange, 9.8–10.9 mm long, and 13–14 mm wide fruit with 10 longitudinal ridges bears 7–20 small lenticels. The broadly elliptic, brownish-red, wrinkled, 5.9–6.5 mm long, 3.3–3.7 mm wide, and 2.7–3.4 mm tall seeds have narrow longitudinal grooves. Flowering occurs from May until June, and the fruits ripen from September until October.

== Taxonomy ==
It was first described as Sorbus busambarensis G.Castellano, P.Marino, Raimondo & Spadaro by Giuseppe Castellano, Pasquale Marino, Francesco Maria Raimondo, and Vivienne Spadaro in 2012. It was moved to the genus Aria (Pers.) J.Jacq. ex Host as Aria busambarensis (G.Castellano, P.Marino, Raimondo & Spadaro) Sennikov & Kurtto by Alexander Nikolaevitsch Sennikov and Arto Kurtto in 2017. The type specimen was collected on the 17 October 2009 by Castellano and Raimondo in carbonatic scree above Piano della Tramontana, Rocca Busambra, Sicily, Italy at an altitude of 1315 m above sea level. It may be closely related to Aria graeca.

=== Etymology ===
The specific epithet busambarensis refers to the Rocca Busambra mountain.

== Distribution and habitat ==
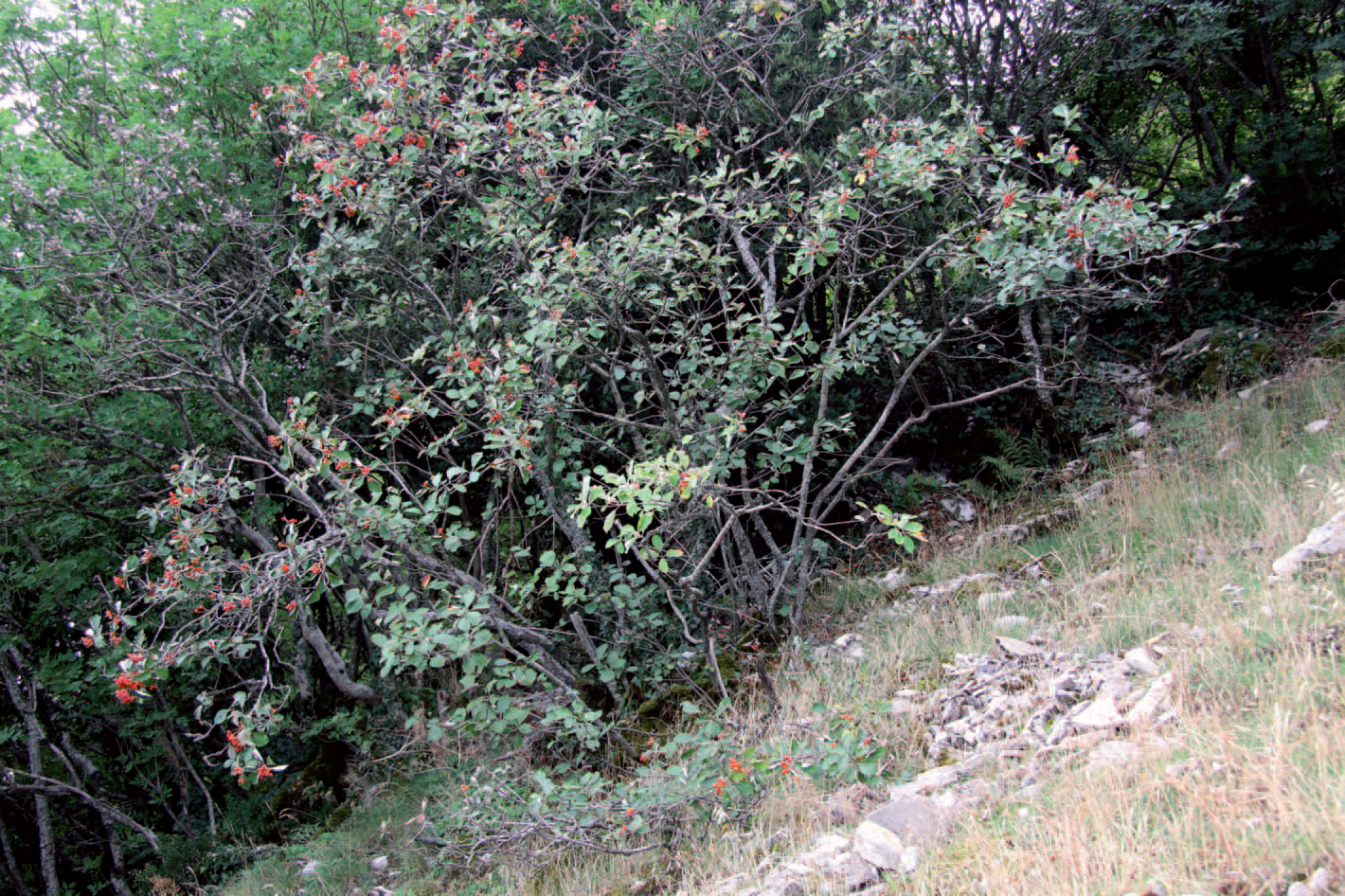
Aria busambarensis growing in its natural habitat

It is endemic to Sicily, Italy, where it is restricted to a very small area of only 0.2 km^{2} on the northeastern slopes of Rocca Busambra, where it grows in Quercus ilex dominated woods, scrub, and screes on rocky, carbonate soils at altitudes of 1150–1400 m above sea level.

== Conservation ==
Aria busambarensis is a critically endangered species with a small population of 25 mature trees. It is not cultivated in any ex situ conservation collections.
