= Maulazzo Lake =

Lake in Sicily, Italy

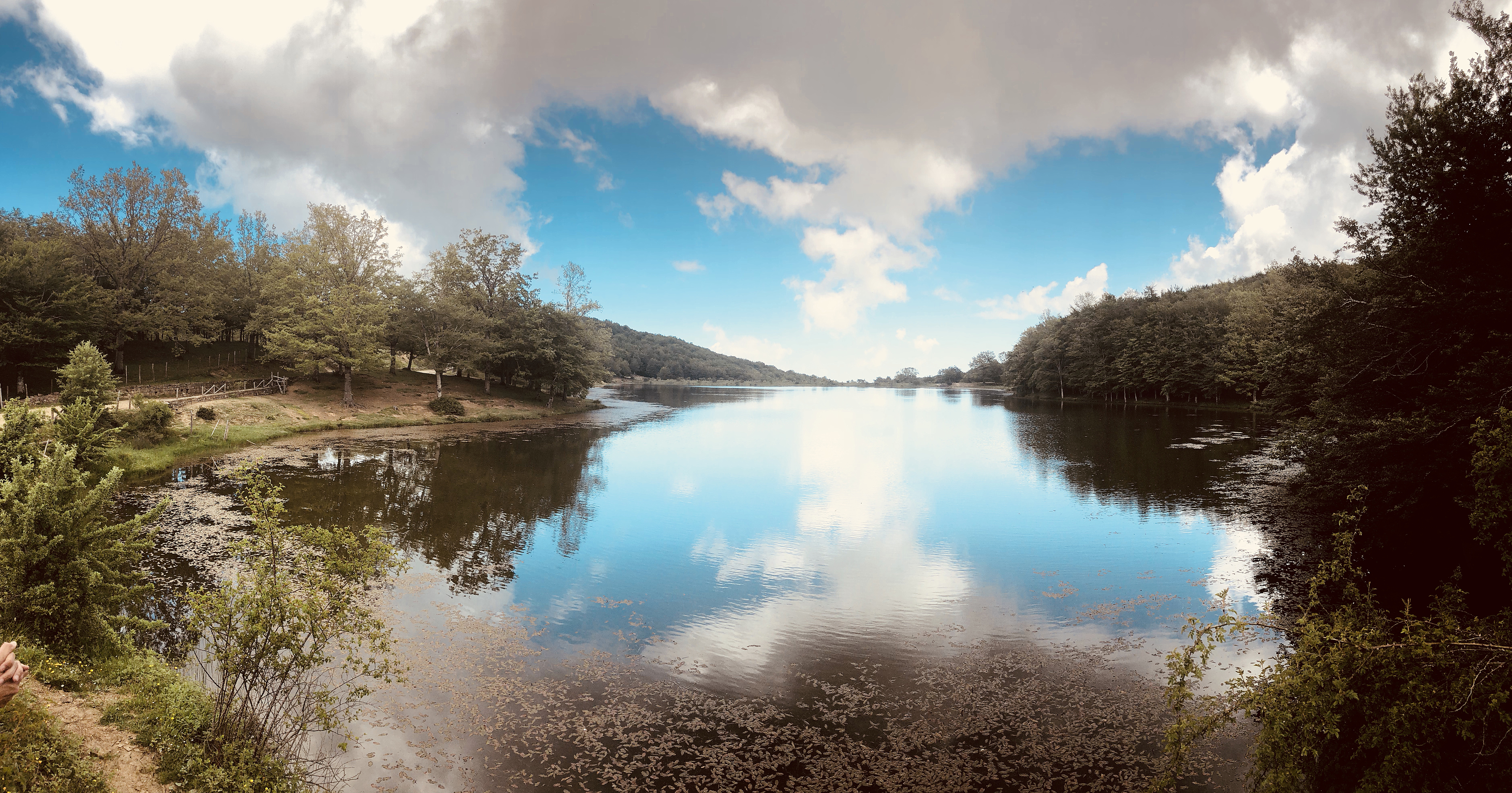

- Location within Sicily
- Location: Province of Messina, Sicily
- Coordinates: 37.941135°N 14.671683°E
- Basin countries: Italy
- Surface area: 0.05 km^{2} (0.019 sq mi)
- Surface elevation: 1,400 m (4,600 ft)

Maulazzo Lake is an artificial reservoir in the Province of Messina, Sicily, Italy. At an elevation of 1450 m, its surface area is 0.05 km².
