= Aria meridionalis =

Scientific classification
- Kingdom: Plantae
- Clade: Tracheophytes
- Clade: Angiosperms
- Clade: Eudicots
- Clade: Rosids
- Order: Rosales
- Family: Rosaceae
- Genus: Aria
- Species: A. meridionalis

Binomial name
- Aria meridionalis (Guss. ex Tod.) Raimondo & Greuter
- It is endemic to Sicily, Italy

Synonyms
- Pyrus aria subsp. meridionalis (Guss. ex Tod.) H.Lindb.; Pyrus meridionalis Guss. ex Tod.; Pyrus meridionalis subvar. dilatata Asch. & Graebn.; Sorbus aria f. meridionalis (Guss. ex Tod.) Strobl; Sorbus aria subsp. meridionalis (Guss. ex Tod.) A.Kern.; Sorbus aria var. meridionalis (Guss. ex Tod.) Nyman; Sorbus meridionalis (Guss. ex Tod.) Simonk.; Sorbus meridionalis f. typica Sagorski; Sorbus umbellata subsp. meridionalis (Guss. ex Tod.) Vǎlev

Species of tree in the family Rosaceae

Aria meridionalis is a species of shrub or tree in the family Rosaceae endemic to Sicily, Italy.

== Description ==
=== Vegetative characteristics ===
Aria meridionalis is a 2.5–6 m tall shrub or tree with smooth, grey bark and glabrous, reddish branches with few lenticels. The large to medium-sized, obovate, or ovate to elliptical leaves with a 8–5 cm long, and 4.5–6 cm wide lamina has 6–8 pairs of lateral veins. The base is cuneate. The sometimes slightly lobed leaf margin is serrate or biserrate. The apex is acute and often acuminate. The green adaxial leaf surface is glabrous, and the greyish-white abaxial leaf surface is tomentose.

=== Generative characteristics ===
The ovoid, scarlet red, 11.5-12.5 mm long, and 11-12 mm wide fruit bears numerous lenticels. Flowering occurs from April to May, and fruiting occurs from September to October.

== Taxonomy ==
It was first described as Pyrus meridionalis Guss. ex Tod. by Agostino Todaro in 1886 based on previous work by Giovanni Gussone. It was moved to the genus Aria (Pers.) J.Jacq. ex Host as Aria meridionalis (Guss. ex Tod.) Raimondo & Greuter by Francesco Maria Raimondo and Werner Rodolfo Greuter in 2019. It has been confused with Aria graeca and Aria umbellata.

=== Etymology ===
The specific epithet meridionalis means from the south.

== Distribution and habitat ==
It is endemic to Sicily, Italy.
