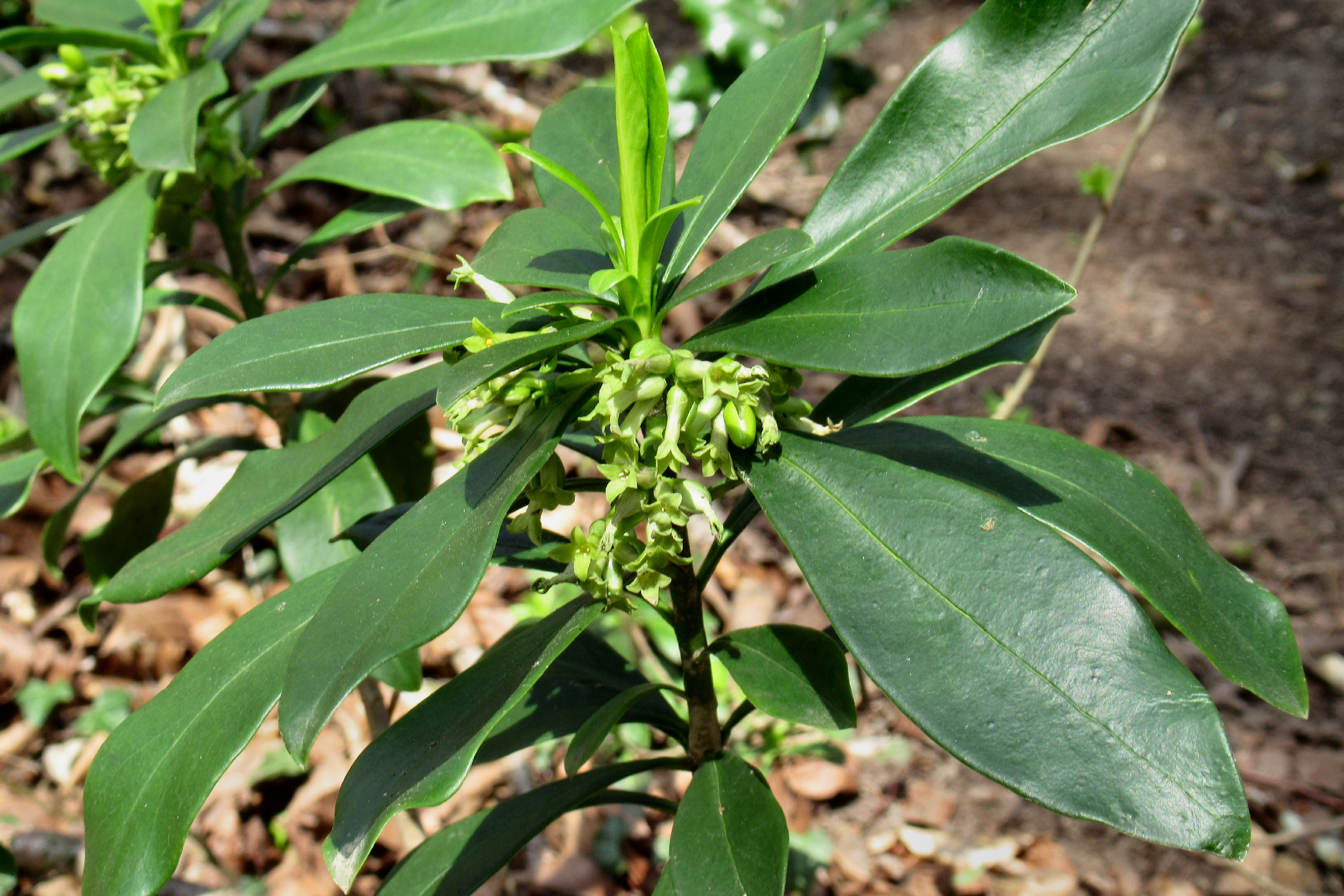
- In flower, Box Hill, Surrey

Scientific classification
- Kingdom: Plantae
- Clade: Embryophytes
- Clade: Tracheophytes
- Clade: Spermatophytes
- Clade: Angiosperms
- Clade: Eudicots
- Clade: Rosids
- Order: Malvales
- Family: Thymelaeaceae
- Genus: Daphne
- Species: D. laureola

Binomial name
- Daphne laureola L.

= Daphne laureola =

Species of plant

Daphne laureola, commonly called spurge-laurel, is a woodland shrub in the flowering plant family Thymelaeaceae. Its native range covers much of western and southern Europe and extends to Algeria, Morocco and the Azores.

== Description ==
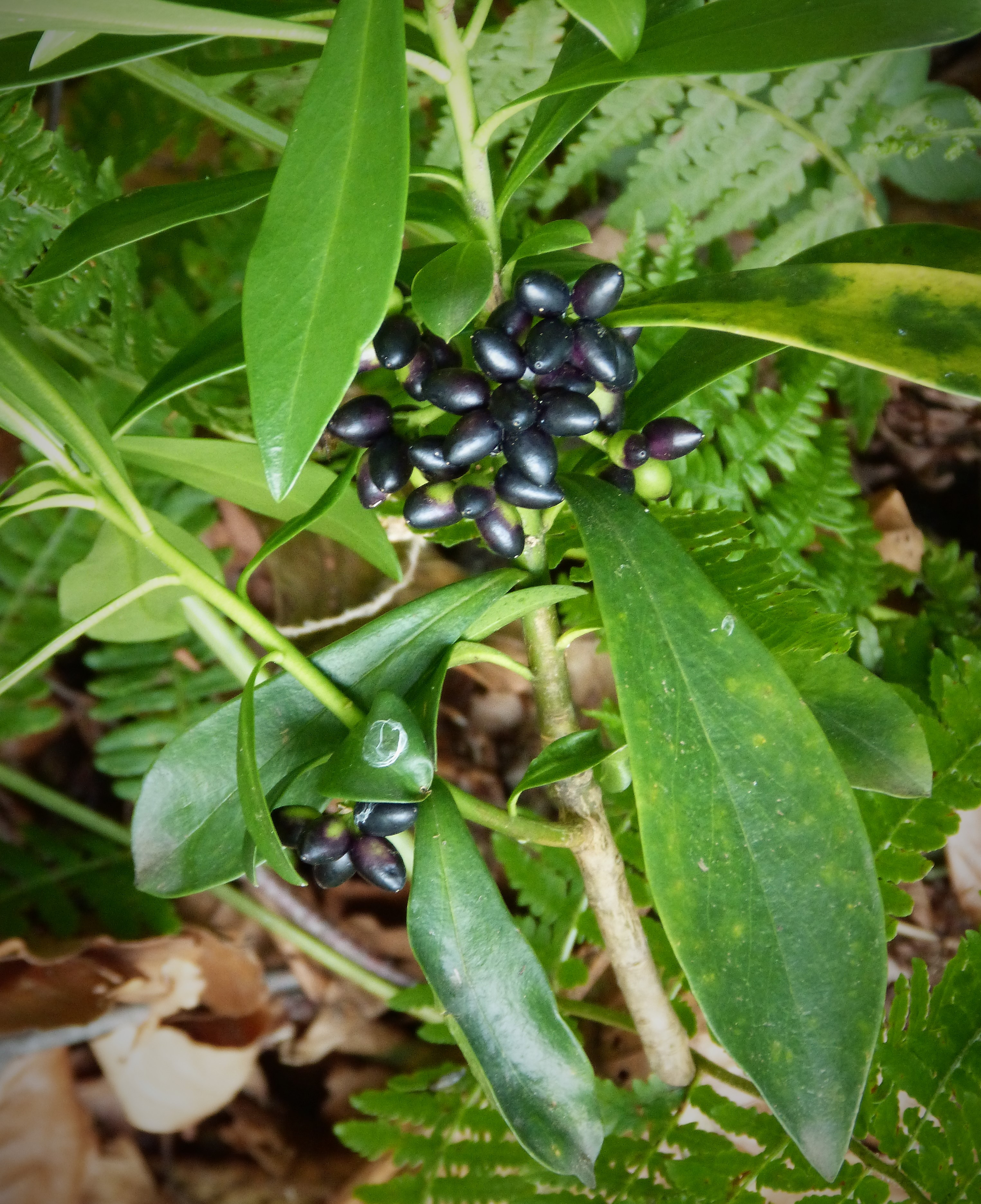
In fruit, Valbona Valley, Albania

Daphne laureola reaches a height between 0.5–1 metre (2–3 ft), rarely to 1.5 m. The habit of this shrub can be upright or decumbent (arched at the base then spreading upward). The bark is thin and yellow-grey when mature, while immature stems are green. The leaves are spirally arranged, usually forming dense whorls at the shoot tips, but may clothe the full length of the shoots. The leaves are oblanceolate to obovate-oblanceolate, 5–12 centimetres (2–5 in) long and 1–3 cm wide. They are glabrous (hairless), dark green and glossy on the upper surface, and lighter green beneath.

The flowers are 8–12 mm long, inconspicuous, yellow-green, with four sepals and no petals, and are honey-scented, produced in small axial racemes somewhat hidden among the leaf bases. Flowering is in late winter and early spring, with pollination by flies and moths; the plant is outcrossing, so seed production depends on multiple plants being present. The berry is black, egg-shaped, and 1.5 cm (1/2 in) wide, containing one seed; it ripens in late summer, and is poisonous to humans, but not to birds, which eat the berries and disperse the seeds.

== Taxonomy ==
Two subspecies are accepted by the Plants of the World Online database; they are not considered distinct by the Euro+Med Plantbase, which treats the species as monotypic.

- Daphne laureola subsp. laureola — most of the species' range
- Daphne laureola subsp. philippi (Gren.) Nyman — restricted to the Pyrenees

== Etymology ==
The genus name Daphne is from the ancient Greek for laurel. Daphne is also the name of a dryad in Greek mythology who was transformed into a laurel tree. The specific epithet laureola means 'laurel-like'; therefore, the binomial translates to "laurel-like laurel". The English name spurge-laurel refers its superficial foliage resemblance to a laurel, and to its spurge-like purgative properties.

== Ecology and habitat ==
It is one of two species of Daphne native to Great Britain, the other being Daphne mezereum. Both have a strong preference for alkaline soils and are most commonly found in limestone areas, although D. laureola is also found on clay. However, unlike D. mezereum, D. laureola is evergreen, with yellowish-green flowers borne very early in the spring and black berries.

== As an invasive species ==
Outside its native range, D. laureola is naturalised in Scotland, Ireland, Denmark, and Crimea. It has become an invasive weed in parts of Australasia and western North America. Growing in sun or shade, it is well-suited to the temperate forest understory and can colonise areas (both by seeding and by root suckering) to form monotypic stands and out-compete native vegetation. It is a Class B Noxious weed in Washington state. It is also a weed in native forests in Tasmania, Australia, and New Zealand.

Hand-pulling is effective against small infestations (gloves must be worn to protect against the caustic sap); shrubs too large or too small to pull must be dug out.

== Toxicity ==
All parts of the plant, including the fruit, are poisonous for humans. The sap is known to cause skin rashes on contact.

== In culture ==
Gilbert White called it dwarf laurel, and on 5 December 1783 "fetched them" from the high wood and hanger at Selborne and planted them in his garden.
