= Aria madoniensis =

Conservation status
- Endangered (IUCN 3.1)

Scientific classification
- Kingdom: Plantae
- Clade: Tracheophytes
- Clade: Angiosperms
- Clade: Eudicots
- Clade: Rosids
- Order: Rosales
- Family: Rosaceae
- Genus: Aria
- Species: A. madoniensis

Binomial name
- Aria madoniensis (Raimondo, G.Castellano, Bazan & Schicchi) Sennikov & Kurtto
- It is endemic to the Madonie Mountains, northern Sicily, Italy

Synonyms
- Pyrus madoniensis (Raimondo, G.Castellano, Bazan & Schicchi) M.F.Fay & Christenh.; Sorbus madoniensis Raimondo, G.Castellano, Bazan & Schicchi

Species of tree in the family Rosaceae

Aria madoniensis is a species of tree in the family Rosaceae endemic to the Madonie Mountains in northern Sicily, Italy. It is an endangered species.

== Description ==
=== Vegetative characteristics ===
Aria madoniensis 1.5–3 m tall shrub or tree with glossy, smooth, greyish-red bark and spreading branches. The young, reddish, glabrous, smooth branches bear few ovate, 0.6–0.8 mm long lenticels. The rhombic or suborbicular, coriaceous, 4.0–5.5 cm long, and 3.5–4.5 cm wide lamina with a biserrate, slightly lobed margin has a broadly cuneate or rounded base. The adaxial leaf surface is glabrous or thinly tomentose. The white abaxial leaf surface is tomentose. The leaf has 5–7 straight, unbranched pairs of lateral veins. The 9–13 mm long petiole is tomentose.

=== Generative characteristics ===
The corymbose inflorescence is tomentose. The orange to yellowish orange, tomentose, 6.6–8.5 mm long, and 7–9 mm wide fruit bears 0–10 small lenticels. Flowering occurs from May until June.

== Taxonomy ==
It was first described as Sorbus madoniensis Raimondo, G.Castellano, Bazan & Schicchi by Francesco Maria Raimondo, Giuseppe Castellano, Giuseppe Bazan, and Rosario Schicchi in 2012. It was moved to the genus Aria (Pers.) J.Jacq. ex Host as Aria madoniensis (Raimondo, G.Castellano, Bazan & Schicchi) Sennikov & Kurtto by Alexander Nikolaevitsch Sennikov and Arto Kurtto in 2017. The type specimen was collected on the 5 June 2010 by Raimondo and G. Castellano in the Macchia dell'Inferno area above Castelbuono, Madonie Mountains, Sicily, Italy, at an elevation of 1385 m above sea level.

== Distribution and habitat ==
It is endemic to the Madonie Mountains in northern Sicily, Italy, where it occurs in a very small area of only 1.15 km^{2} growing on slopes, in fresh ravines, in open woodland dominated by Quercus ilex, and scrub at elevations of 1200–1430 m above sea level.

== Conservation ==
Aria madoniensis is an endangered species with a small population of 100–150 mature trees. It isn't cultivated in any ex situ conservation collections. Its natural regeneration is limited.
