= Aria phitosiana =

Scientific classification
- Kingdom: Plantae
- Clade: Tracheophytes
- Clade: Angiosperms
- Clade: Eudicots
- Clade: Rosids
- Order: Rosales
- Family: Rosaceae
- Genus: Aria
- Species: A. phitosiana

Binomial name
- Aria phitosiana Raimondo & Greuter
- It is endemic to northeastern Sicily, Italy

Synonyms
- Sorbus aria var. incisa Lojac.

Species of tree in the family Rosaceae

Aria phitosiana is a species of tree in the family Rosaceae endemic to northeastern Sicily, Italy. It is a rare and vulnerable species.

== Description ==
=== Vegetative characteristics ===
Aria phitosiana is a tree with smooth, brown bark and hanging branches. The young branches have numerous ovate lenticels. The flat, lobed, ovate to suborbicular or elliptic, 3.5–7 cm long, and 2.5–5.5 cm wide leaves with a distally incised-serrate or lobed margin have 4–6 pairs of lateral veins. The apex is mucronate, and the base is cuneate. The acute lobes are irregularly serrate. The glabrous adaxial leaf surface is dark green, and the tomentose abaxial leaf surface is white. The tomentose petiole is 3–10 mm long. Saplings have smaller, suborbicular to subtriangular leaves.

=== Generative characteristics ===
The inflorescence bears 5–16 white, fragrant flowers with woolly pedicels. The subovoid to obovoid, red, 8–10 mm long, and 4–5 mm wide, mostly glabrous fruit with a pubescent apex bears few, scattered lenticels. Flowering occurs from May until June, and fruiting occurs from October until November.

== Taxonomy ==
It was described by Francesco Maria Raimondo and Werner Rodolfo Greuter in 2019. The type specimen was collected on the 7 June 2018 by F. M. Raimondo on the northern slope of Monte Daino on dolomitic rocky ground, Madonie, Sicily, Italy at elevation of 1550 m above sea level.

=== Etymology ===
The specific epithet phitosiana honours the Greek botanist Dimitrios Phitos.

== Distribution and habitat ==
Aria phitosiana is endemic to Sicily, Italy, where it occurs very locally restricted in the dolomitic areas of the Madonie Mountains.

== Conservation ==
It is a very rare and vulnerable species.
