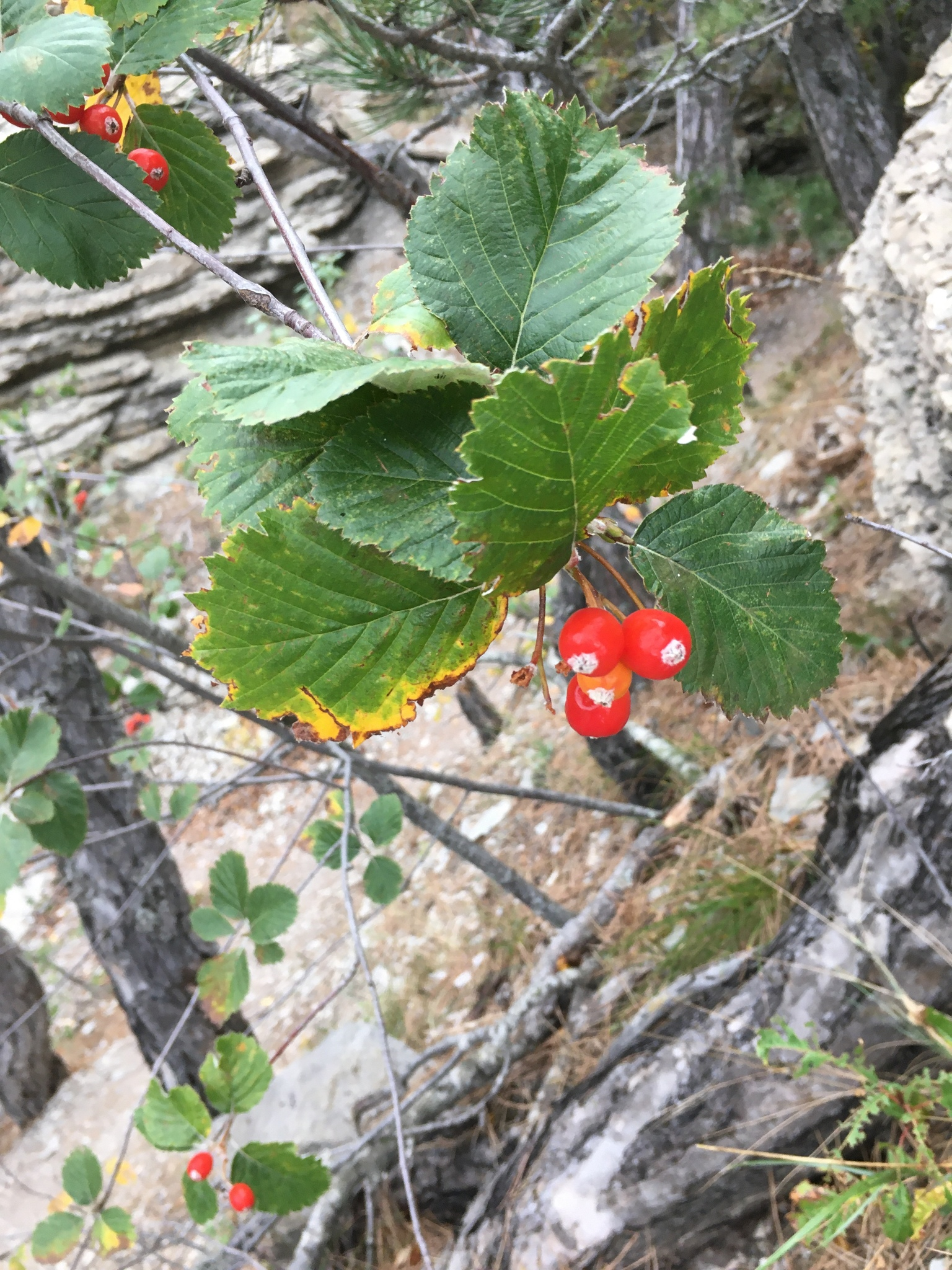
- Fruiting Aria graeca

Conservation status
- Least Concern (IUCN 3.1)

Scientific classification
- Kingdom: Plantae
- Clade: Embryophytes
- Clade: Tracheophytes
- Clade: Angiosperms
- Clade: Eudicots
- Clade: Rosids
- Order: Rosales
- Family: Rosaceae
- Genus: Aria
- Species: A. graeca

Binomial name
- Aria graeca (Lodd. ex Spach) M.Roem.

Synonyms
- List: Aria nivea var. graeca (Lodd. ex Spach) Formánek; Crataegus graeca Lodd. ex Spach; Hahnia aria var. graeca (Lodd. ex Spach) Dippel; Pyrus aria var. graeca (Lodd. ex Spach) Steud.; Pyrus graeca (Lodd. ex Spach) Loudon; Pyrus hellas M.F.Fay & Christenh.; Sorbus aria subsp. graeca (Lodd. ex Spach) Nyman; Sorbus aria var. graeca (Lodd. ex Spach) Griseb.; Sorbus graeca (Lodd. ex Spach) S.Schauer; Aria migarica (Zinserl.) Mezhenskyj; Aria nivea var. cretica (Lindl.) M.Roem.; Pyrus aria var. cretica Lindl.; Pyrus graeca Lodd.; Pyrus meridionalis Guss.; Pyrus meridionalis proles cretica (Lindl.) Asch. & Graebn.; Pyrus migarica (Zinserl.) M.F.Fay & Christenh.; Pyrus porrigens (Hedl.) Druce; Sorbus aria var. cretica (Lindl.) Hayek; Sorbus aria subsp. cretica (Lindl.) Holmboe; Sorbus cretica (Lindl.) Fritsch & Rech.; Sorbus cretica f. cuneifolia (Zinserl.) Kárpáti; Sorbus cretica var. typica Soó; Sorbus graeca var. cuneata Zinserl.; Sorbus graeca f. cuneifolia Kárpáti; Sorbus migarica Zinserl.; Sorbus obtusidentata Zinserl.; Sorbus porrigens Hedl.; Sorbus umbellata var. cretica (Lindl.) C.K.Schneid.

= Aria graeca =

Species of plant

Aria graeca, also known as the Greek whitebeam and fan-leaved service-tree, is a species of whitebeam, in the rose family (Rosaceae).

== Description ==
The Greek whitebeam is a deciduous shrub or small tree from 1 to 8 metres high. It is superficially similar to the closely related common whitebeam, but differs in having more strongly pronounced serrations on its leaves. It bears white flowers and red pomes.

== Distribution and habitat ==
The tree is native to central and southeastern Europe (Albania, Austria, the Balearics, Bosnia-Herzegovina, Bulgaria, Croatia, Czech Republic, France, Germany, Greece, Hungary, Italy, Malta, Poland, Romania, Sicily, Slovakia, Slovenia, Serbia, Turkey, Ukraine), the Caucasus (Armenia, Azerbaijan, Georgia), the Eastern Mediterranean (Cyprus, Lebanon, Syria) and parts of North Africa (Algeria, Morocco).
