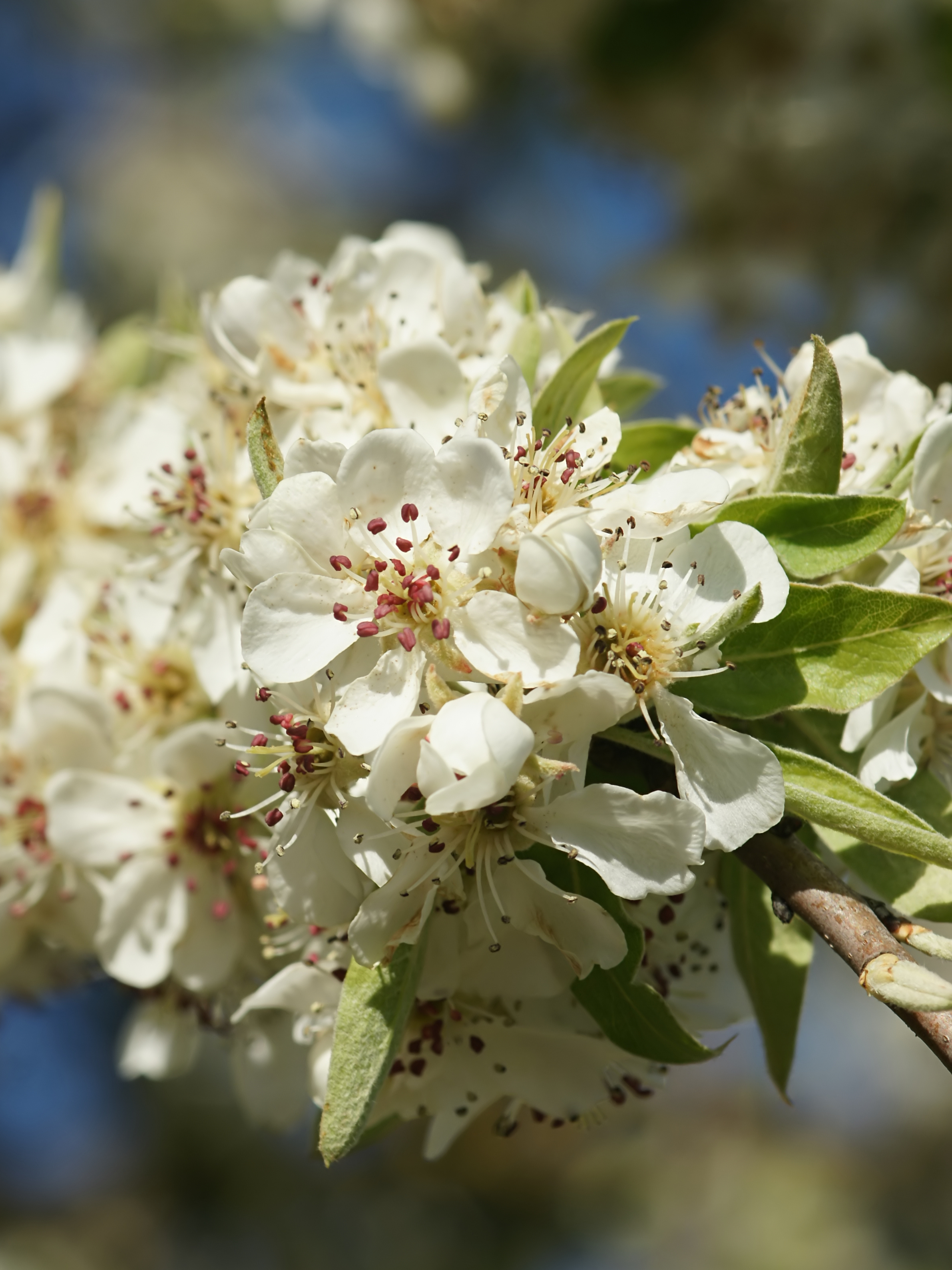
- P. spinosa flowers in Italy
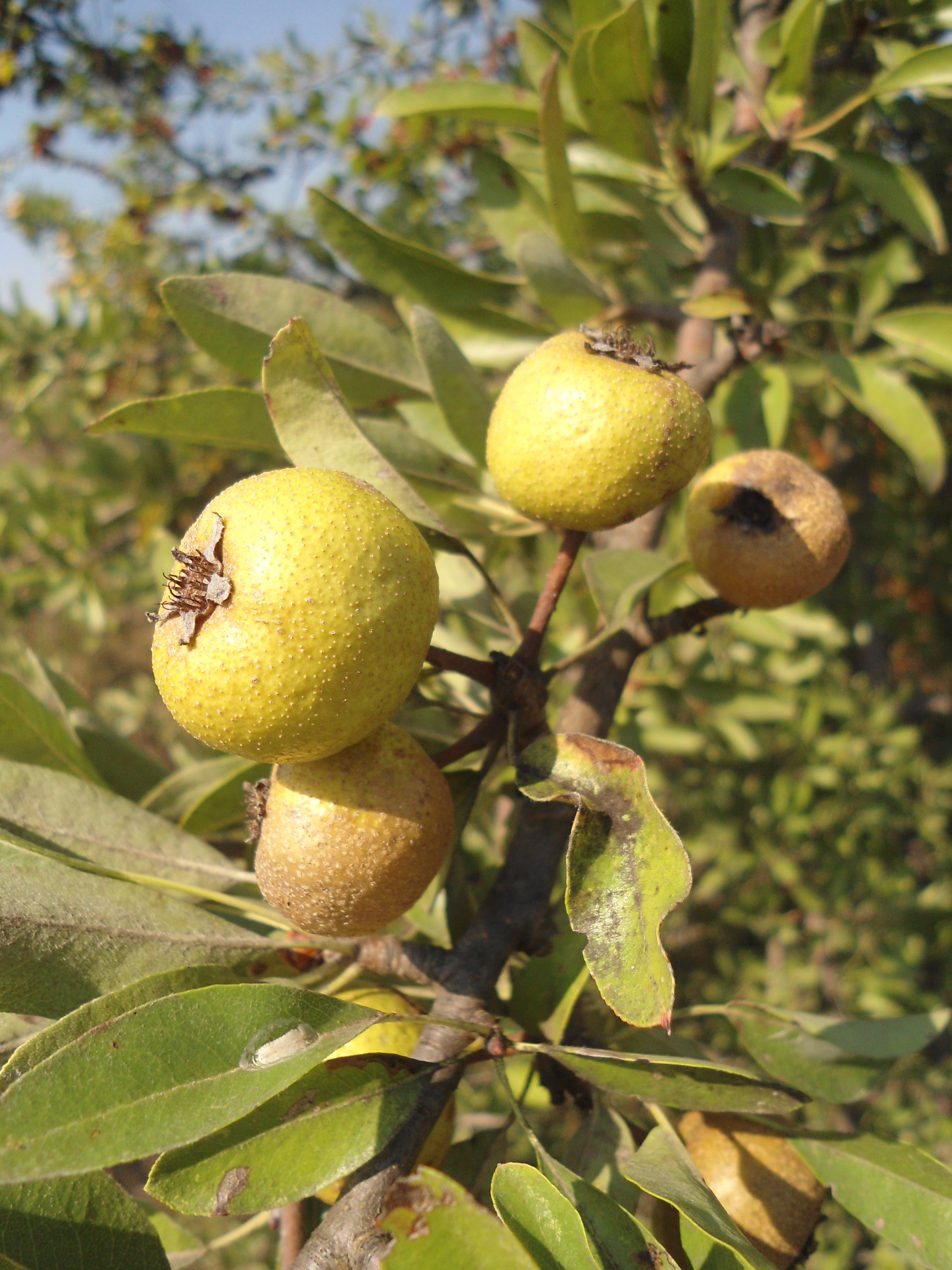
- Fruit

Conservation status
- Least Concern (IUCN 3.1)

Scientific classification
- Kingdom: Plantae
- Clade: Tracheophytes
- Clade: Angiosperms
- Clade: Eudicots
- Clade: Rosids
- Order: Rosales
- Family: Rosaceae
- Genus: Pyrus
- Species: P. spinosa

Binomial name
- Pyrus spinosa Forssk.

Synonyms
- List: Crataegus amygdaliformis (Vill.) Chalon; Malus heterophylla Spach; Pyrus amygdaliformis Vill.; Pyrus amygdaloides Link; Pyrus cuneifolia Guss.; Pyrus eriopleura Rchb.; Pyrus heterophylla (Spach) Steud.; Pyrus nivalis Lindl.; Pyrus oblongifolia Spach; Pyrus parviflora Desf.; Pyrus persica Pers.; Pyrus sicula Tineo; Pyrus spinosa var. diapulidis Dostálek; Pyrus spinosa f. lobata (Decne.) Dostálek; Pyrus spinosa var. microphylla (Decne.) Browicz; Pyrus spinosa var. oblongifolia (Spach) Dostálek; Pyrus spinosa var. sinaica (Dum.Cours.) Dostálek

= Pyrus spinosa =

Species of plant in the rose family

Pyrus spinosa (syn. Pyrus amygdaliformis), the almond-leaved pear, is a species of flowering plant in the family Rosaceae, native to the northern Mediterranean region. It has white flowers which bloom in April–May. The fruits are bitter and astringent. It hybridizes easily with Pyrus communis and Pyrus pyraster.

== Description ==
Pyrus spinosa is a spiny shrub or small tree reaching up to about 6 m in height. Young twigs are initially covered in a dense, white woolly hair (villous), but become smooth and hairless (glabrous) as they mature. Its leaves are narrow and variable in shape—ranging from lanceolate (lance‑shaped) or elliptic (oval) to obovate (egg‑shaped with the broader end toward the tip)—and measure about 2.5–5.0 cm long (occasionally up to 7 cm) by 1–2 cm wide (occasionally up to 3 cm). The margin is usually entire (smooth) but may bear shallow, rounded teeth (crenations) near the tip. Leaves may be sessile (attached directly) or carried on short stalks (petioles) up to 2 cm long. When young, the lower surface of each leaf is white‑villous, later becoming smooth on both sides.

In spring, the species produces many‑flowered clusters (corymbs) whose stalks and bracts are covered in greyish, matted hairs (tomentose). Individual flowers are 2.0–2.5 cm across, with five white petals surrounding a cup‑shaped hypanthium.

By mid to late summer, the plant bears small pomes (pear‑like fruits) 2–3 cm in diameter. The fruit is nearly spherical (subglobose), yellowish‑brown when ripe, and retains its calyx lobes at the tip. Each fruit is borne singly on a stout, stiff stalk (pedicel) 2–3 cm long.

== Habitat and distribution ==
Pyrus spinosa is native to the Mediterranean region, with a core range extending through southern Europe into western Anatolia. It typically grows in dry, open forests and scrublands on well‑drained, rocky slopes and at woodland margins, favouring elevations of 1,000–2,000 m (3,300–6,600 ft) where it often occurs alongside oaks and other drought‑tolerant shrubs. Although principally recorded from Europe and Anatolia, herbarium collections from two sites in western Iran—close to the Turkish border in the Zagros Mountains—confirm its presence there, representing an eastward extension of its known distribution.

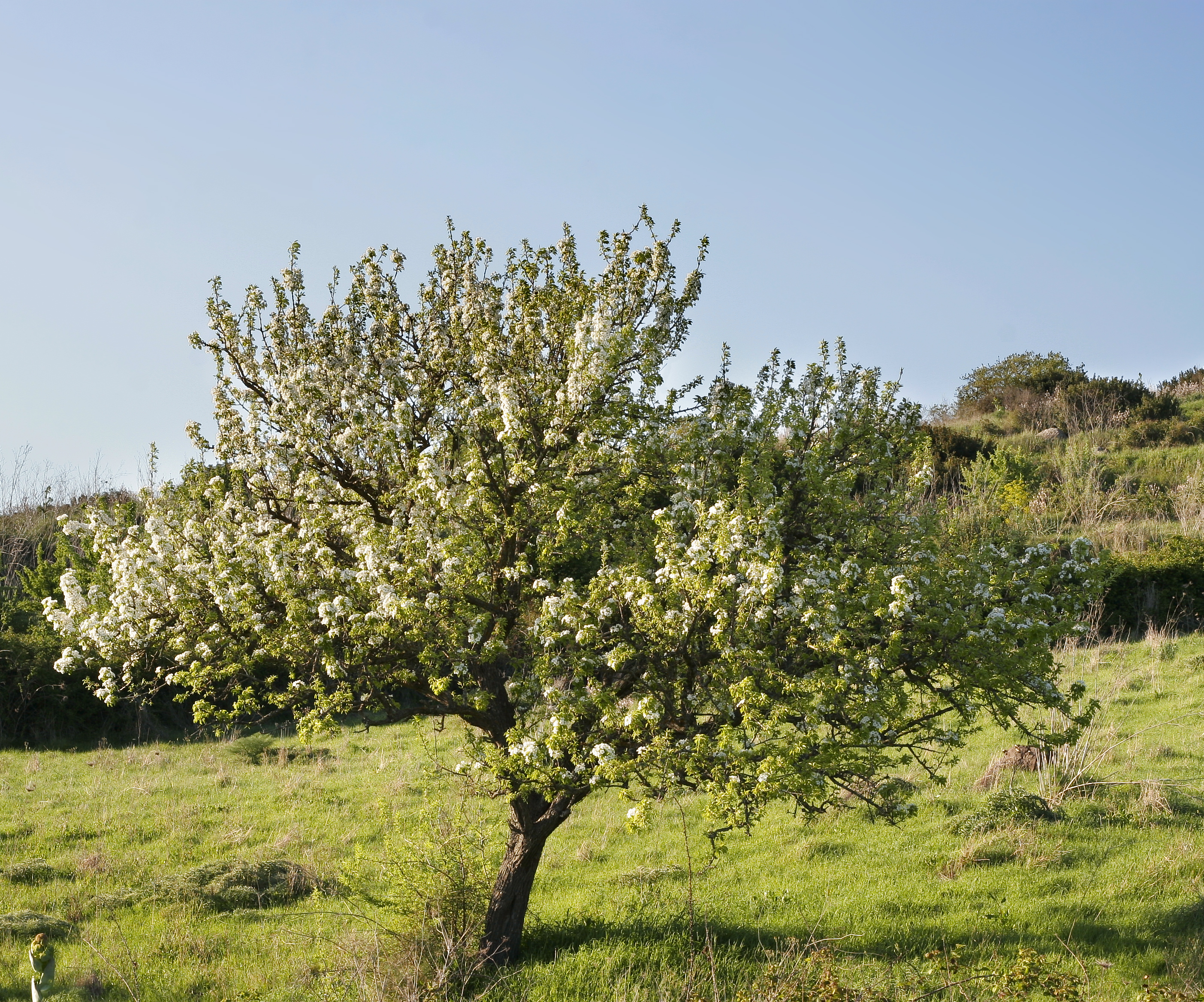
Growth form

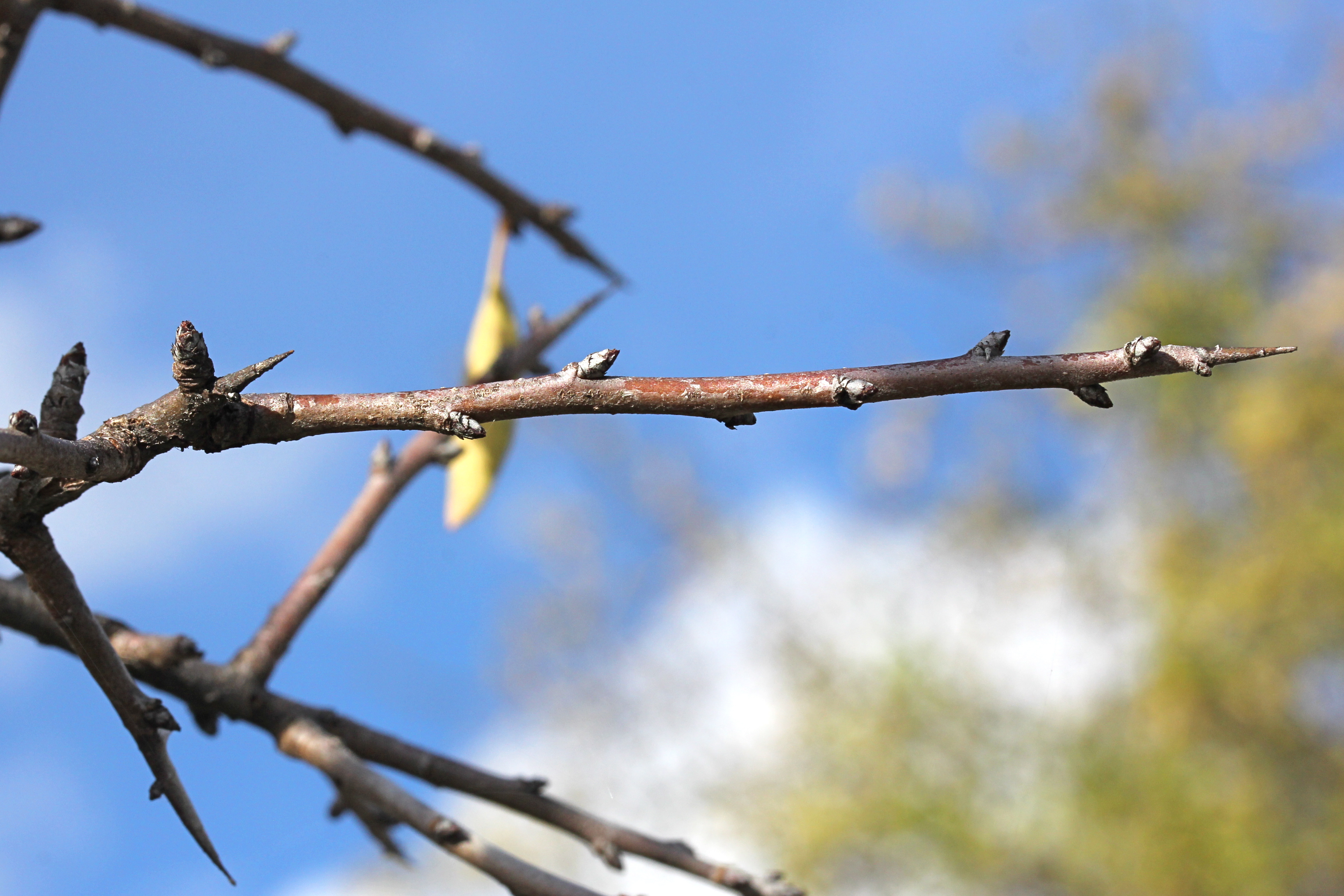
Thorns

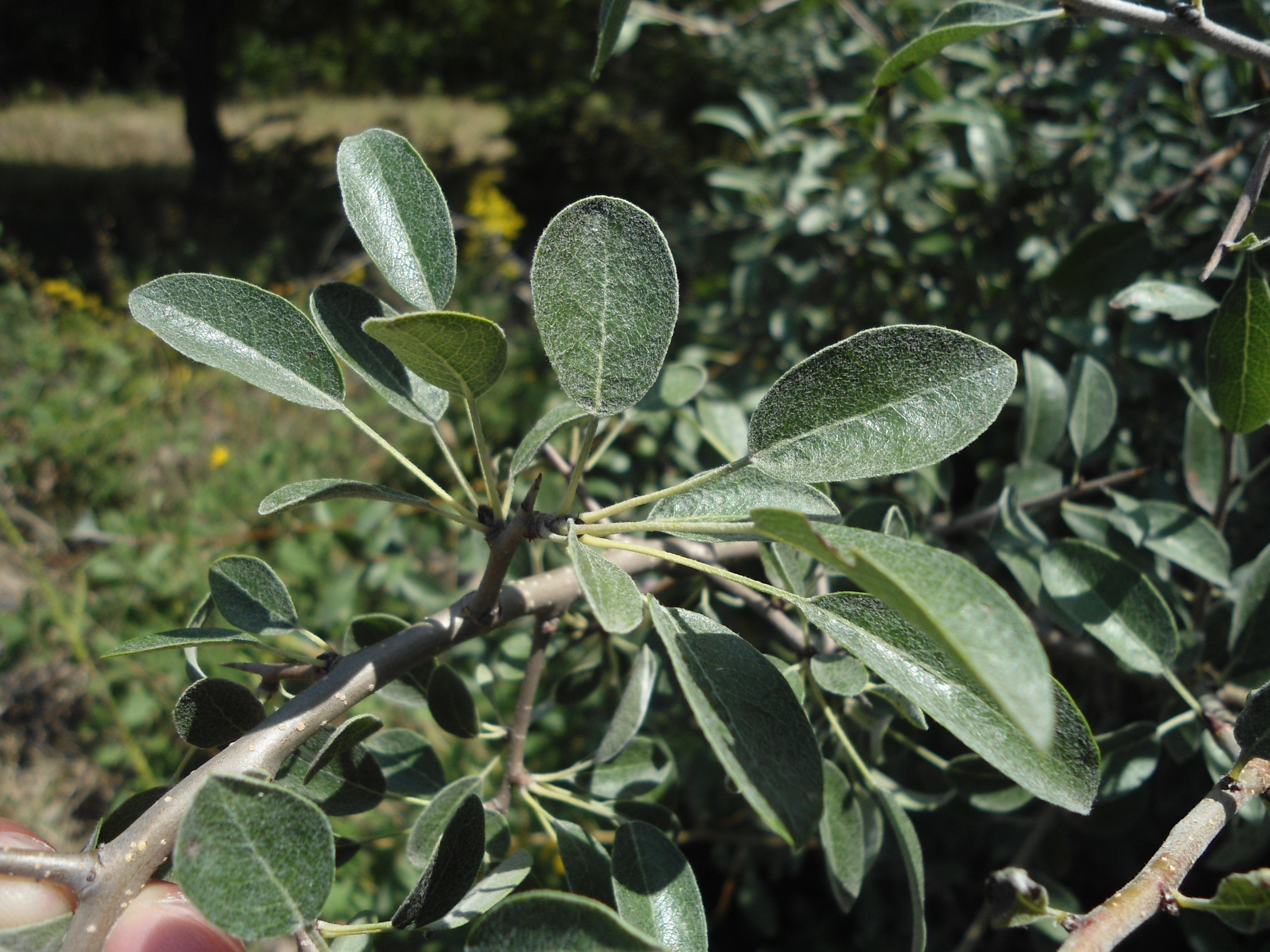
Leaves

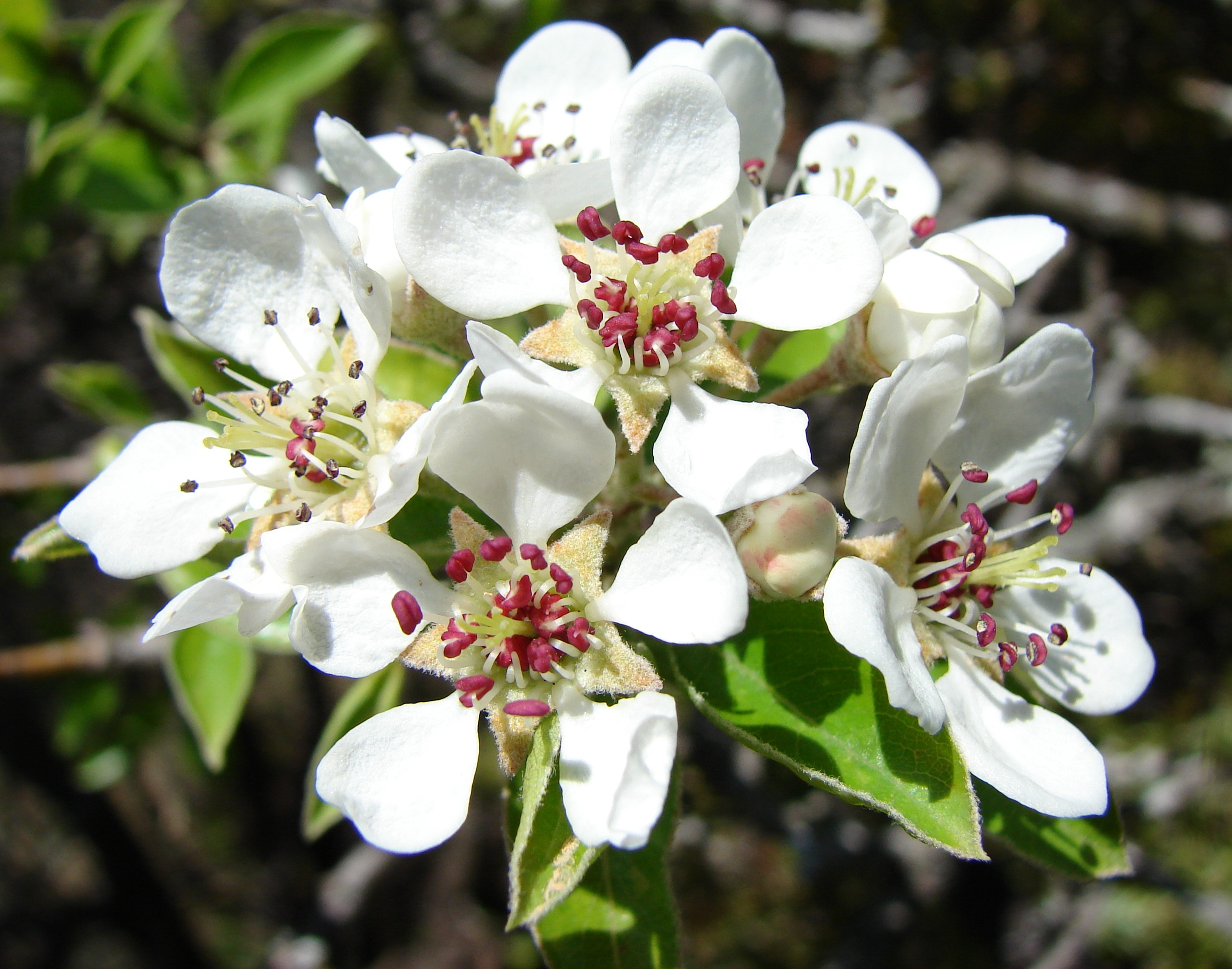
Close-up of flowers
