= Nebrodi =

Mountain in Italy

Coordinates: 37°54′N 14°35′E

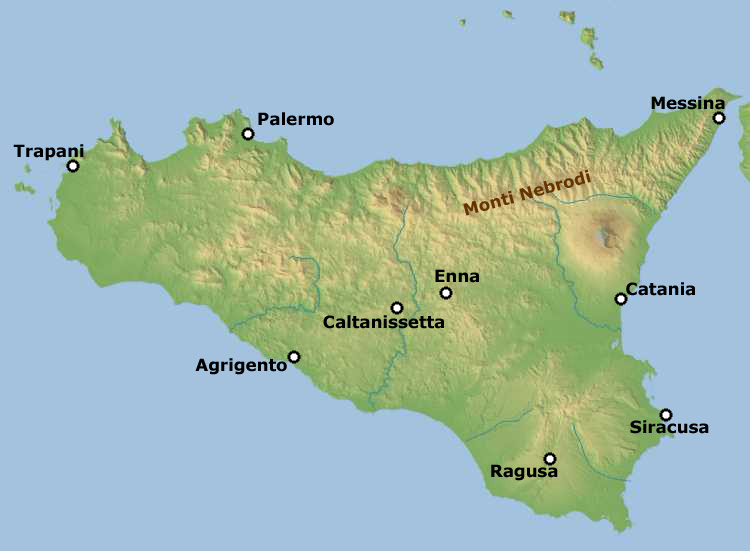

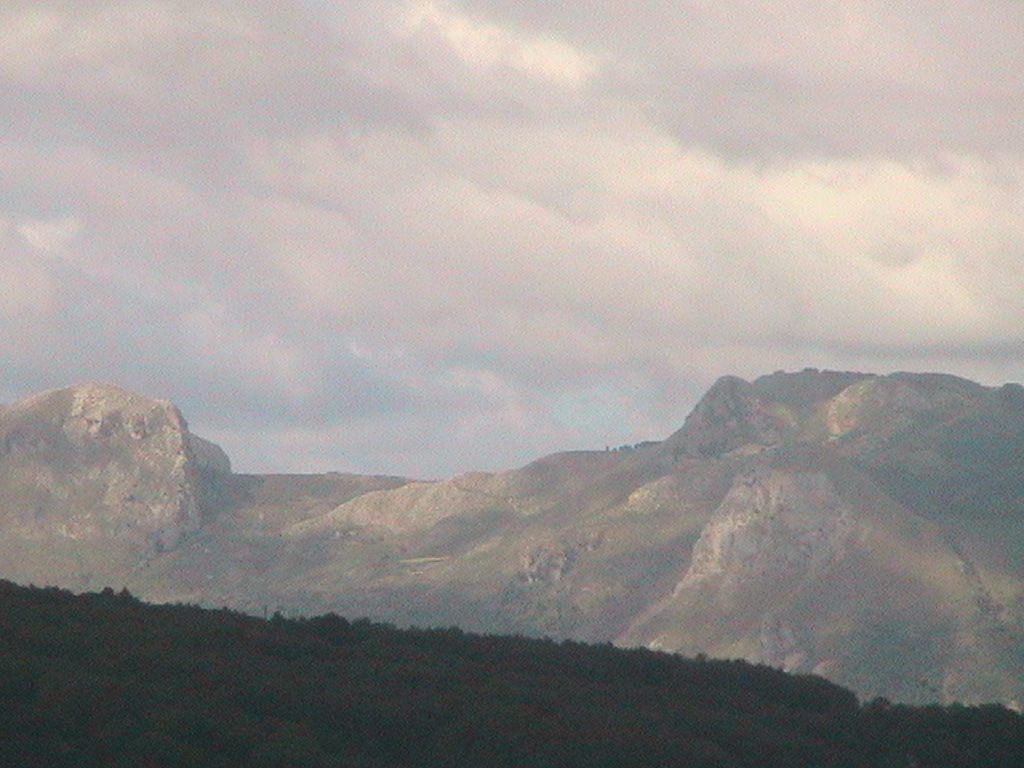
The Rocche del Crasto seen from Ficarra.

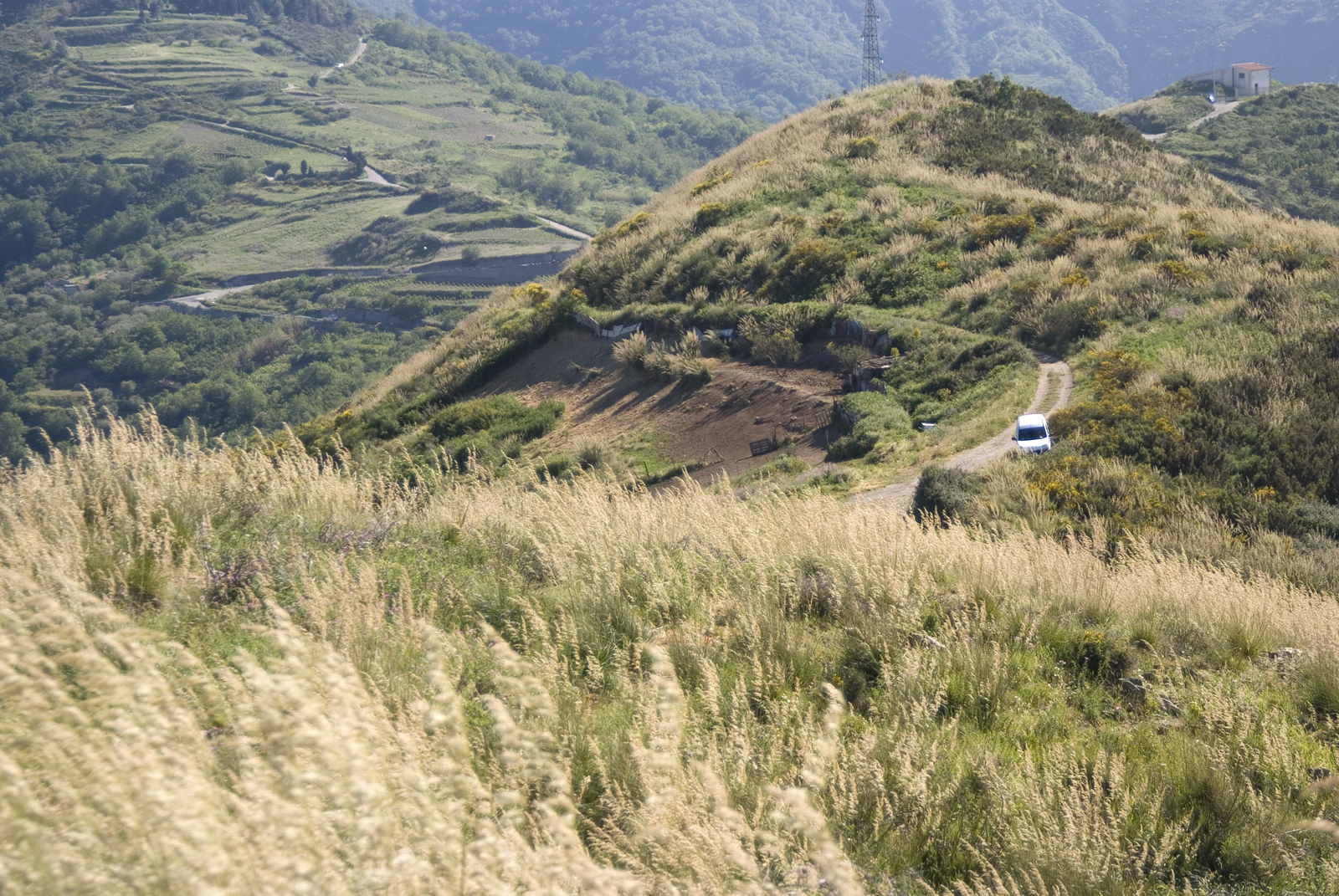
Shepherd's car in the Nebrodi, Sicily

The Nebrodi (Sicilian: Munti Nèbbrudi; Italian: Monti Nebrodi, Italian pronunciation: [ˈnɛːbrodi]; Latin: Nebrōdēs montēs) is a mountain range that runs along the north east of Sicily. Together with the Madonie and the Peloritani, they form the Sicilian Apennines.

The mountains run from the Peloritani on the eastern part of the island to the foothill of the Madonie mountains to the west, facing the Tyrrhenian Sea on the north. Mount Etna, from which it is separated by the rivers Alcantara and Simeto, forms the range's southern border. Several of the peaks are above 1500 meters with the highest being the Monte Soro (1,847 m) and the Serra del Re (1,754 m). The range mostly made up of sandstone and clay rocks, but include also limestone landscapes, like the Rocche del Crasto where is located the Grotta del Lauro abundant of stalactites and stalagmites . Towns that are situated in the mountains include Troina, Nicosia, Mistretta, and a number of other towns in the province of Messina.

== Ecology ==
Much of the mountains are covered by thick forests of cork trees on the lowest slopes giving way to oak and then beech at the higher elevations. Yew trees occur in the beech forests. In many areas the upland forest has been cleared to make mountain pastures.

Salix nebrodensis, a species of willow shrub, is endemic to the Nebrodi. Genista aristata, a species of broom, is native only to the Nebrodi and Madonie mountains.

== Parco dei Nebrodi ==
On 4 August 1993 large areas of the Nebrodi Mountains were made into national parkland. The park covers 856.87 km^{2}. It touches on many of the comuni in the mountains and is one of the largest protected parks in Sicily.
