= Flora of Italy =

Plant species of Italy

The flora of Italy is all the plant life present in the territory of the Italian Republic. The flora of Italy was traditionally estimated to comprise about 5,500 vascular plant species. However, as of 2019, 7,672 species are recorded in the second edition of the flora of Italy and in its digital archives Digital flora of Italy. In particular, 7,031 are autochthonous and 641 are non native species widely naturalized since more than three decades. Additionally, further 468 exotic species have been recorded as adventitious or naturalized in more recent times.

Geobotanically, the Italian flora is shared between the Circumboreal Region and Mediterranean Region. According to the index compiled by the Italian Ministry for the Environment in 2001, 274 vascular plant species were protected. Italy has 1,371 endemic plant species and subspecies.

== Biodiversity ==
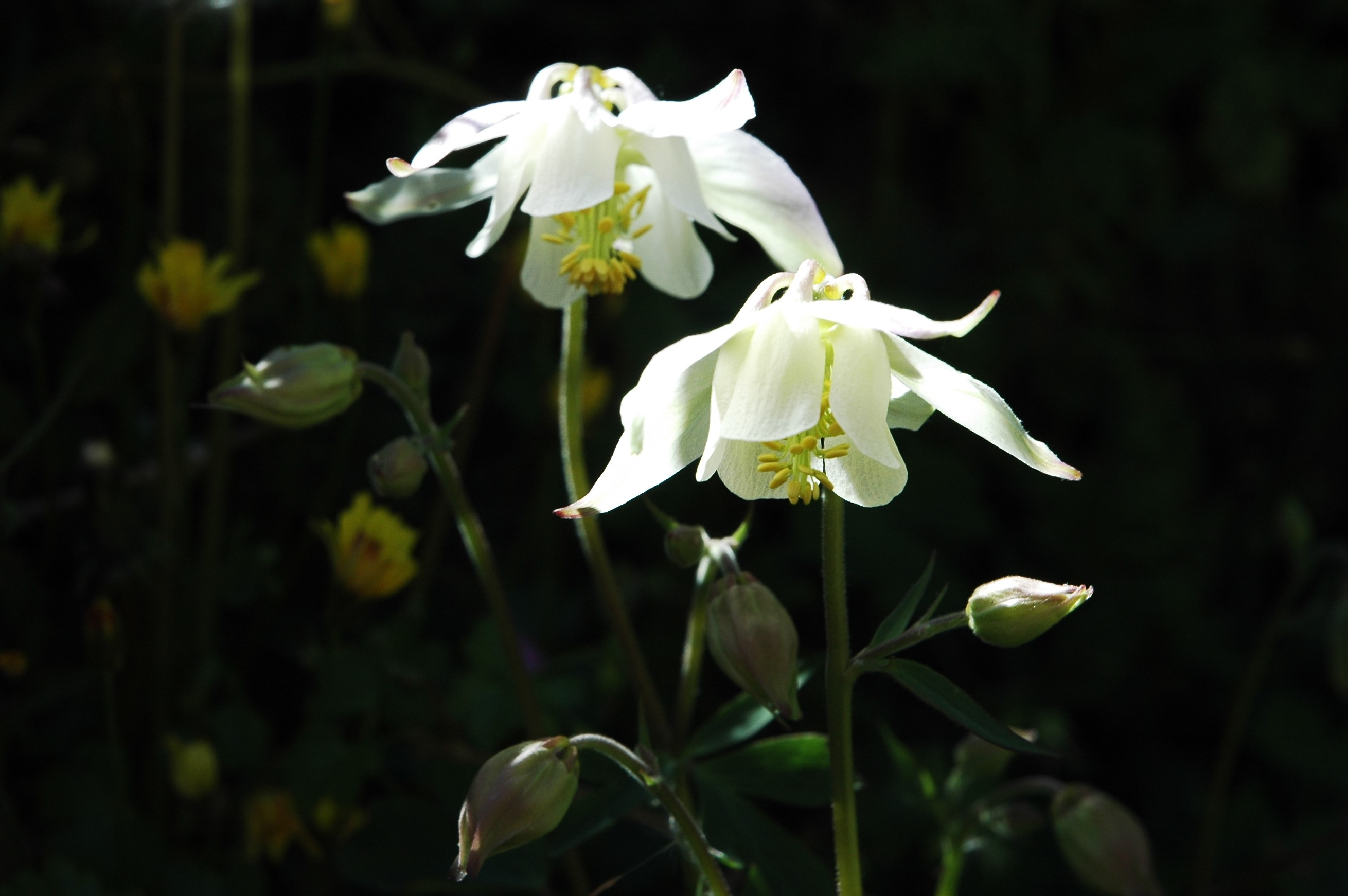
Barbaricina columbine, endemic to Sardinia

Italy is one of the richest European countries in both plant and animal biodiversity, with a population very rich in endemic forms, and has the highest level of biodiversity of both animal and plant species within the European Union. During the Pleistocene glaciations, the Italian territory remained largely free of ice, which allowed the flora and fauna to survive, something that did not happen in the central-northern areas of the continent, and the retreat of the great glaciers has left glacial relict fauna in some mountain locations.

The Italian territory extends over about 10° of latitude, therefore, while remaining in the context of temperate climates without extremes of heat, cold or aridity, the climatic difference between the north and the south of the country is not at all negligible, going from the nival climates of the Alpine peaks, to the cool semi-continental temperate climate of the Po Valley, to the Mediterranean climate of the central-southern coasts and the islands. Italy is predominantly hilly and mountainous in nature of the territory, which has caused a proliferation of ecological niches, close in space but very diversified.

== Geography and climate ==
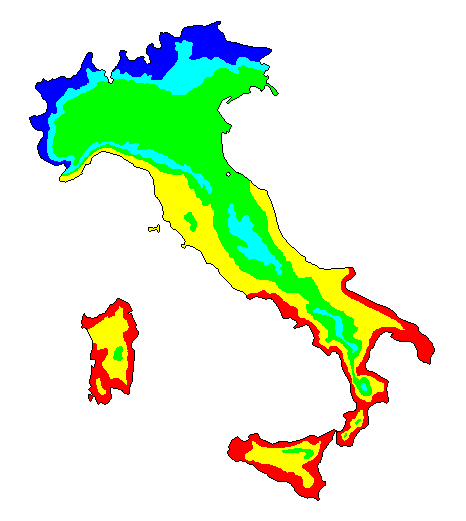
Map of the hardiness zones of Italy. Area of conifers and blueberries Area of beech and raspberries Area of chestnut and vine Area of olive tree Area of citrus

Italy consists of a 1,000 km (620 miles) long peninsula extending out into the central Mediterranean, together with a number of islands to the south and west. The Apennines run north-south through the peninsula connecting the Alps in the north to Etna and the Peloritani mountains in Sicily in the south. The geology is diverse.

Northern Italy is dominated by the Alps and an extensive valley of the Po river which is extensively agricultural and industrialised. Central Italy includes the regions of Tuscany, Umbria, Marche and Lazio. It is dominated by the Apennines, from which a few major rivers flow. There are few natural plains. A process of land reclamation has replaced the coastal swamps and marshes with agricultural land.

Southern Italy includes the regions of Abruzzo, Molise, Apulia, Basilicata, Calabria and Campania. Agriculture and industry are less developed. The main islands are Sicily, Sardinia and the Aeolian Islands.

Because of the length of the Italian Peninsula and the mostly mountainous hinterland, the climate of Italy is highly diverse. In most of the inland northern and central regions, the climate ranges from humid subtropical to humid continental and oceanic. In particular, the climate of the Po Valley geographical region is mostly continental, with harsh winters and hot summers. The coastal areas of Liguria, Tuscany and most of the South generally fit the Mediterranean climate stereotype (Köppen climate classification). Each region has a distinct flora.

== Ecoregions ==
An ecoregion is an ecologically and geographically defined area with characteristic natural communities and species. Different ecoregions are distinguished by different vegetation features. Most of the Italian territory is included in the Mediterranean Basin. Important Italian terrestrial ecoregions include the Illyrian deciduous forests, the Italian sclerophyllous and semi-deciduous forests, the South Apennine mixed montane forests, the Tyrrhenian-Adriatic sclerophyllous and mixed forests, Apennine deciduous montane forests, the Dinaric Mountains mixed forests and the Po Basin mixed forests.

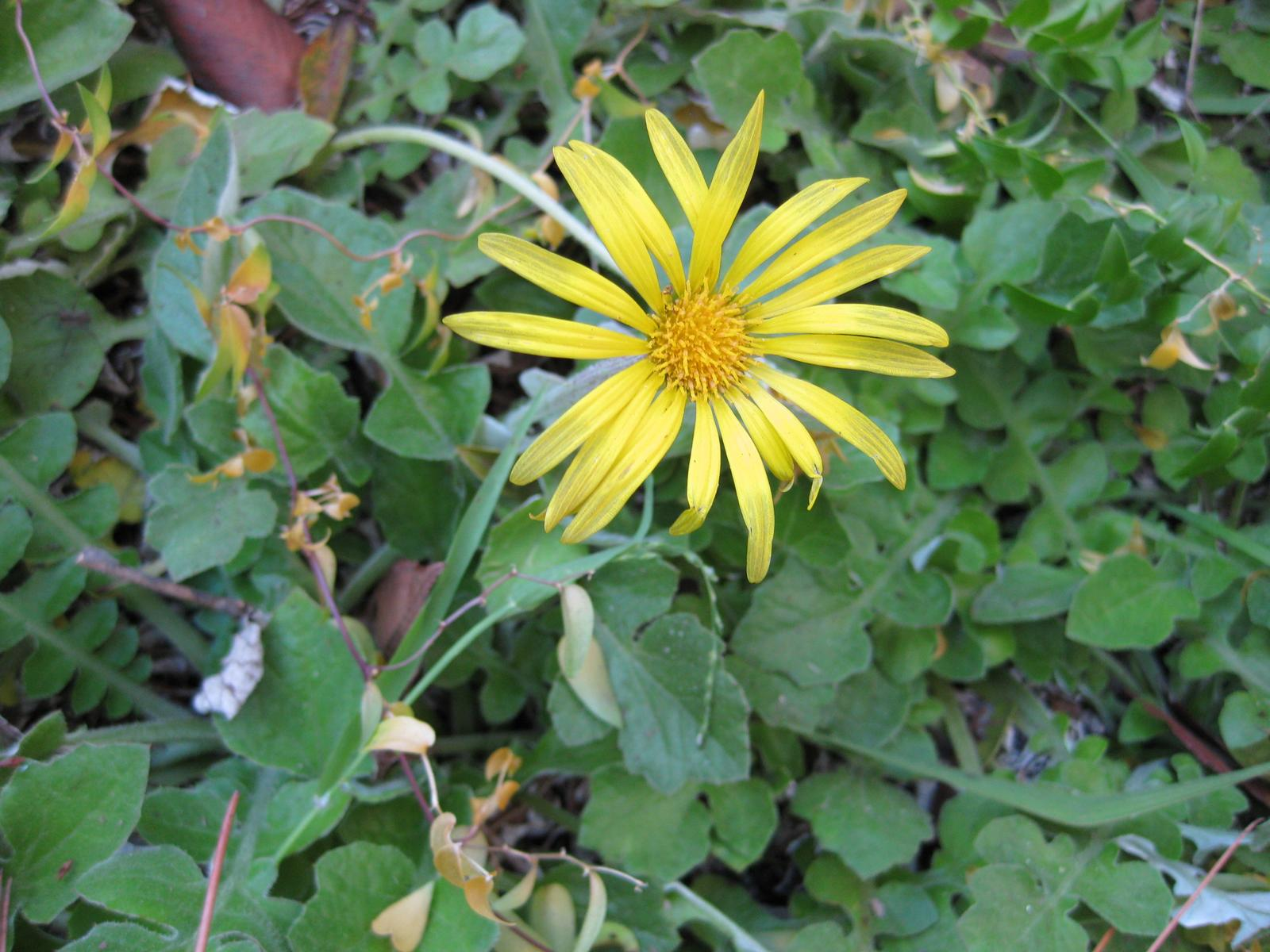
Sea marigold, a critically endangered species endemic to Sicily

In Italy Carlo Blasi et al. identified and mapped two divisions (Temperate and Mediterranean), 13 provinces, 33 sections and approximately 80 subsections. Each unit has an alphanumeric code that indicates its hierarchical level and a full name that indicates its geographic location and main diagnostic factor.

- the Temperate division includes the Alps, the Po Plain, and most of the Apennines. It accounts for 64% of Italy. This area is characterized by almost absent summer aridity and by marked differences between summer and winter temperatures. The natural vegetation mainly consists of forests, with broad-leaved deciduous plants (Quercus, Fagus and Carpinus species).
- the Mediterranean division includes the southern Apennines, the Tyrrhenian and Ionian coasts, the southern Adriatic coast and the Islands. It accounts for almost 36% of the Italian territory. This area is characterized by summer aridity, with precipitations concentrated in autumn and winter. The natural vegetation mainly consists of mixed woods of evergreen and deciduous species, shrublands and Mediterranean maquis.

== The floral composition ==
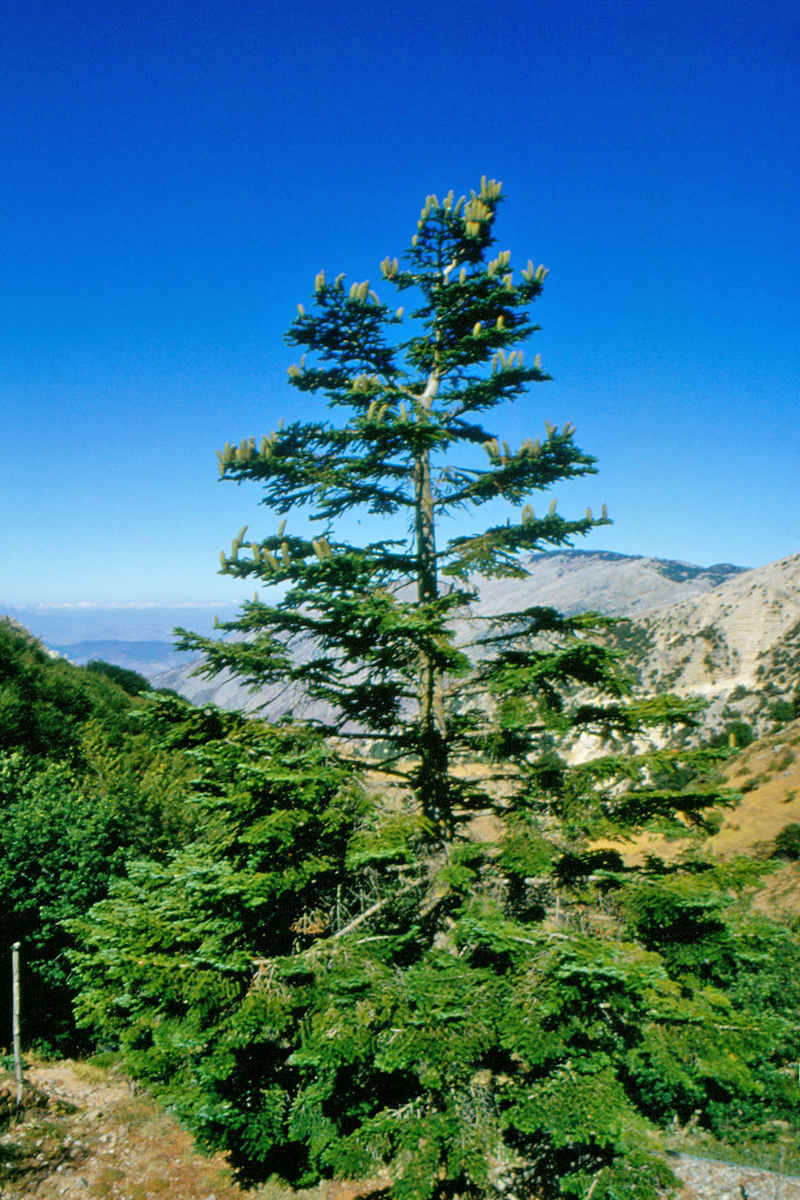
Sicilian Fir, a critically endangered species endemic to Sicily

The native vegetation of Italy reflects the diversity of the physical environment: the differences in geology, the differences of altitude above sea level and the diversity of the climate between the continental and the peninsular Italy, that give rise to various phytoclimatic areas.

The peninsula and islands are dominated by the characteristics of the Mediterranean climate, with mild and rainy winters and very warm and dry summers. On the contrary, the north of Italy has lower temperatures in winter and a more uniform distribution of rainfall during the summer.

The species of plants present in Italy belong to the flora of the continental Europe or to the Mediterranean flora. In some cases Western species can be distinguished (e.g. the Portuguese oak, limited to Western Europe) and eastern species (e.g. the downy oak, present in Eastern Europe).

The last ice age, the Würm Glaciation, in the Alps ended about 12,000 years ago, and one can still recognize its influence on vegetation, in particular by means of glacial relict species. A well known example is the Etna birch (Betula aetniensis), driven in Sicily at a time when the climate was much colder.

Broadly there are three different vegetational zones of forests or bushes in Italy:

- Evergreen vegetation: maquis shrubland (Italian: macchia mediterranea) with densely growing plants and shrubs that always have leaves on. This flora is typical of the dry mediterranean climate, especially along the coast and in the islands. The most common plants are olives (Olea europaea), agrumes (Citrus species), maritime pines (Pinus pinaster), cork oaks (Quercus suber), holm oak, carrubo (Ceratonia siliqua), myrtles (Myrtus communis), strawberry tree (Arbutus unedo), sage, junipers (Juniperus communis, tree heath and bay laurel (Laurus nobilis).(Mediterranean South)
- Broad-leaved vegetation (oaks, beeches, chestnuts): it is typical of the mountain region with a humid climate (Apennines and Prealps). Temperate. The most common plants are Castanea sativa, Fagus sylvatica, the relicts Pinus mugo and Pinus nigra var. italica, Sorbus chamaemespilus, Arctostaphylos uva-ursi, and Vaccinium vitis-idaea. There are also a high number of endemic species increasing at higher elevations. Alpine species include Gentiana nivalis, Androsace alpina, Polygala chamaebuxus, Saxifraga oppositifolia and Carlina acaulis.

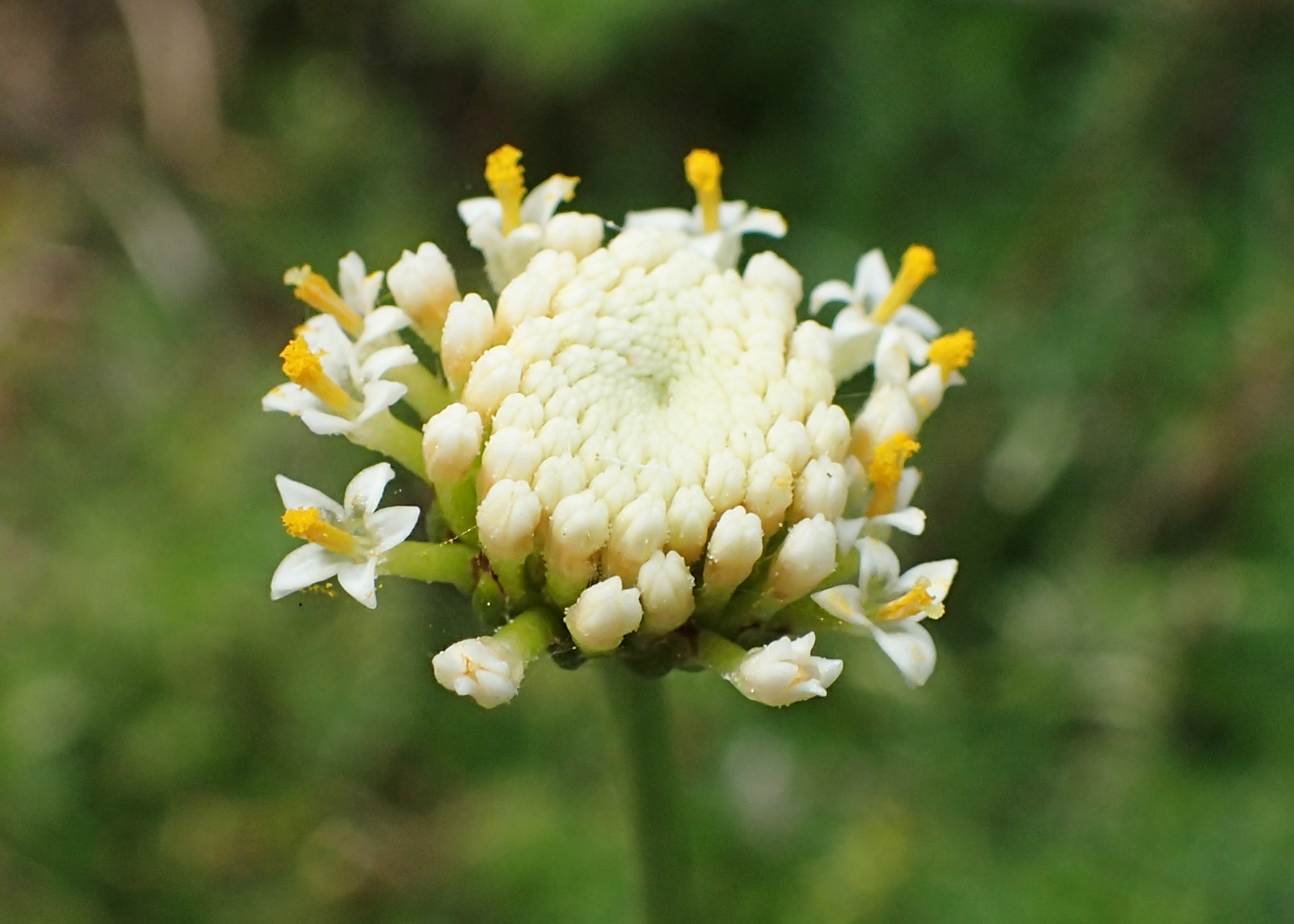
Lavender cotton, endemic to Northwest Italy

- Coniferous vegetation (larches, pines, firs): it is an evergreen vegetation typical of the Alps and of a few high Apennines areas. Temperate. The most common plants present in this phytoclimatic area are Picea abies, Abies alba, Larix decidua, Pinus sylvestris, Pinus nigra, Pinus cembra and Pinus mugo.

In the Po Basin can be found mixed forests that include mixed deciduous oak/hornbeam forests (Quercus robur, Quercus cerris, Carpinus betulus, Ulmus minor, Fraxinus ornus) and Riparian forest, as well as flood-plain vegetation of the Po Basin (Fraxinus oxycarpa, Salix alba, Alnus glutinosa, Ulmus minor, Populus alba, Populus nigra, Quercus robur).

There are also plant associations almost treeless: grasslands, pastures, deserts. In the mountains, gradually, the forest turns in mountain pastures, scattered in various shrubs (e.g. Pinus mugo, rhododendrons, junipers) and dotted with small colorful flowers. Higher up are the montane grasslands and even areas similar to a desert because they have no or almost no vegetation (rocks, glaciers).

== Species richness in Southern Europe ==
Italy has around 6,711 (6,759) species of vascular plants (Conti et al., 2005 An inventory of vascular plants endemic to Italy), preceded only by the Iberian Peninsula and Balearic Islands with around 7,500 vascular plant taxa (species and subspecies) (Castroviejo 2010 Flora Iberica). In Greece, the number of species is around 5,700 (Strid and Tan, 1997 Flora Hellenica) and in France, there are 4,630 species (Walter and Gillett, 1998 1997 IUCN red list of threatened plants). Per unit area Greece is the country with the highest concentration of native plant species.

== Endemic species ==
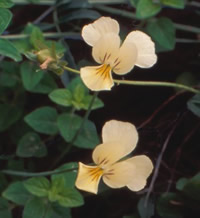
Ucriana violet, endemic to Sicily

Italy has 1,371 endemic plant species and subspecies (18.9% of the total vascular flora). Endemic species include Abies nebrodensis, Allium agrigentinum, Anthemis cupaniana, Calendula maritima, Erysimum etnense, Galium litorale, Petagnaea, Sicilian Fir, Silene hicesiae, Viola ucriana, Zelkova sicula, Aquilegia barbaricina, Aquilegia nuragica, Centaurea gymnocarpa, Centranthus amazonum, Cerastium utriense, Dianthus rupicola, Gagea chrysantha, Galium baldense, Galium glaucophyllum, Genista aetnensis, Hieracium lucidum, Iris benacensis, Iris bicapitata, Iris marsica, Iris pseudopumila, Ophrys calliantha, Orchis brancifortii, Polygala sinisica, Ribes sardoum and Santolina pinnata.

== Threats ==
Habitat loss, fragmentation and degradation are the most significant threats to plant species that occur in Italy. Also changing water flow patterns and over-extraction, increasing droughts due to climate change, pollution and the introduction of alien species threaten the flora. Other threats come from farming (as a result of agricultural expansion and intensification), urbanization and tourism.

The cultivation of plants that give textile fibers (Cannabis sativa, Linum usitatissimum), the cultivation of sugar beet (Beta vulgaris), cereals, potatoes, orchards, vineyards and olive groves have almost replaced the natural vegetation.

The actions of man since Roman times have resulted in the destruction of most of the lowland forests and hills, the expansion of pastures, and the extinction of many species and in the introduction of exotic species which are then naturalized. For example, the Indian fig opuntia (Opuntia ficus-indica), is now common in the warmer parts of the Southern Italy. Also, the invasive false Acacia (Robinia) is widely spread.

== Conservation ==
National and regional parks in Italy

Italy is a signatory to the Berne Convention on the Conservation of European Wildlife and Natural Habitats and the Habitats Directive both affording protection to Italian fauna and flora. National parks cover about 5% of the country, while the total area protected by national parks, regional parks and nature reserves covers about 10.5% of the Italian territory, to which must be added 12% of coasts protected by marine protected areas.

== Notable botanists ==
- Arcangeli, Giovanni. Compendio della flora italiana. Torino: Loescher, 1882.
- Cesati, Vincenzo de, Giovanni Passerini & Giuseppe Gibelli. Compendio della flora italiana. Vol. 1-35. Milano: Vallardi, 1868-1886.
- Fiori, Adriano. Nuova flora analitica d'Italia. Vol. 1-2. Firenze: Ricci, 1923-1929.
- Parlatore, Filippo & Teodoro Caruel. Flora italiana. Vol. 1-10. Firenze: Le Monnier, 1848-1896.
- Sandro Pignatti. Flora d'Italia. Vol. 1-3. Bologna: Edagricole, 1982. ISBN 88-506-2449-2.
- Sandro Pignatti; Riccardo Guarino; Marco La Rosa. Flora d'Italia, 2nd ed. Vol. 1-4. Bologna: Edagricole, Edizioni Agricole di New Business Media 2017-2019.

== Herbaria ==
The following table includes herbaria located in Italy.

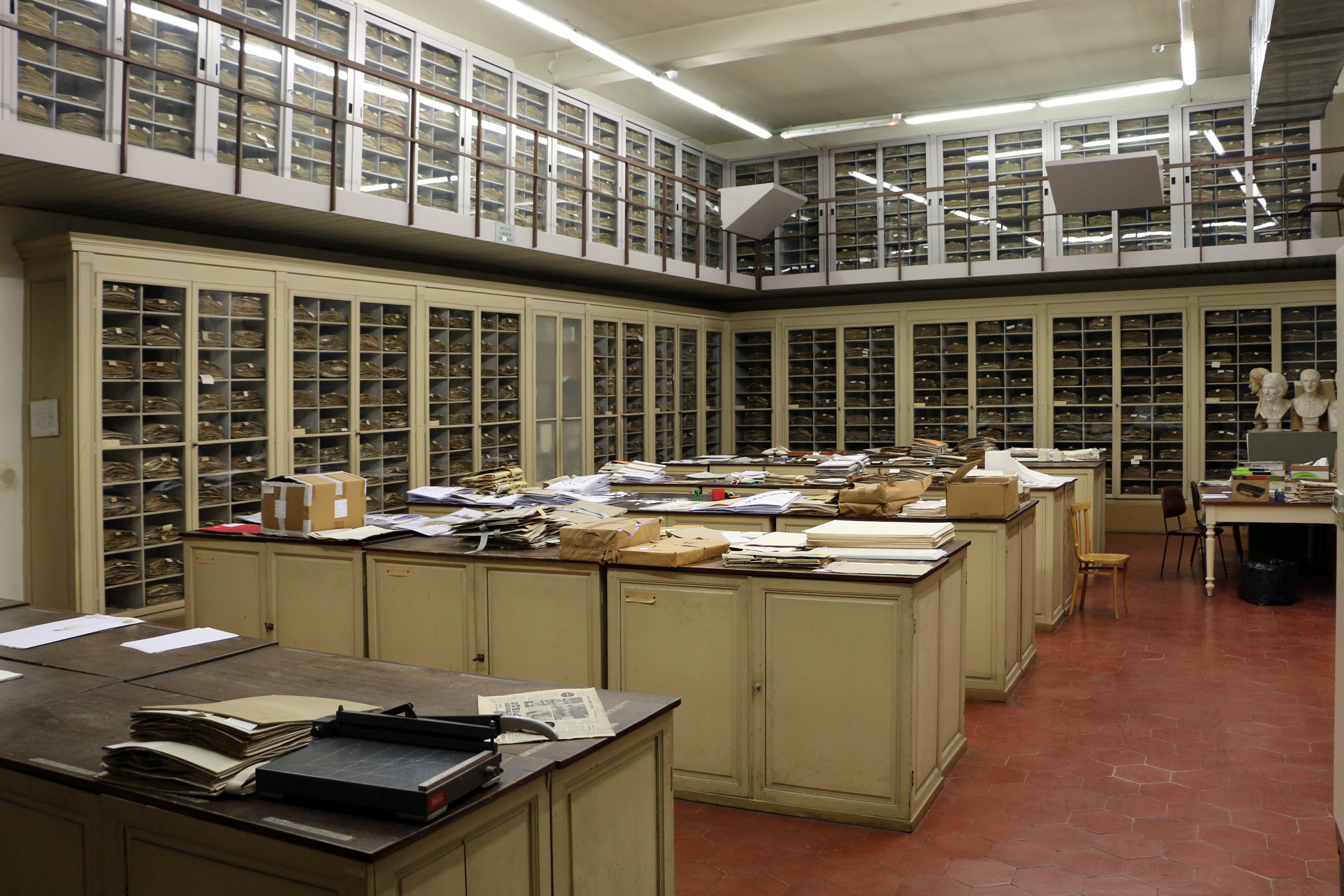
Herbarium of the Museo di Storia Naturale di Firenze

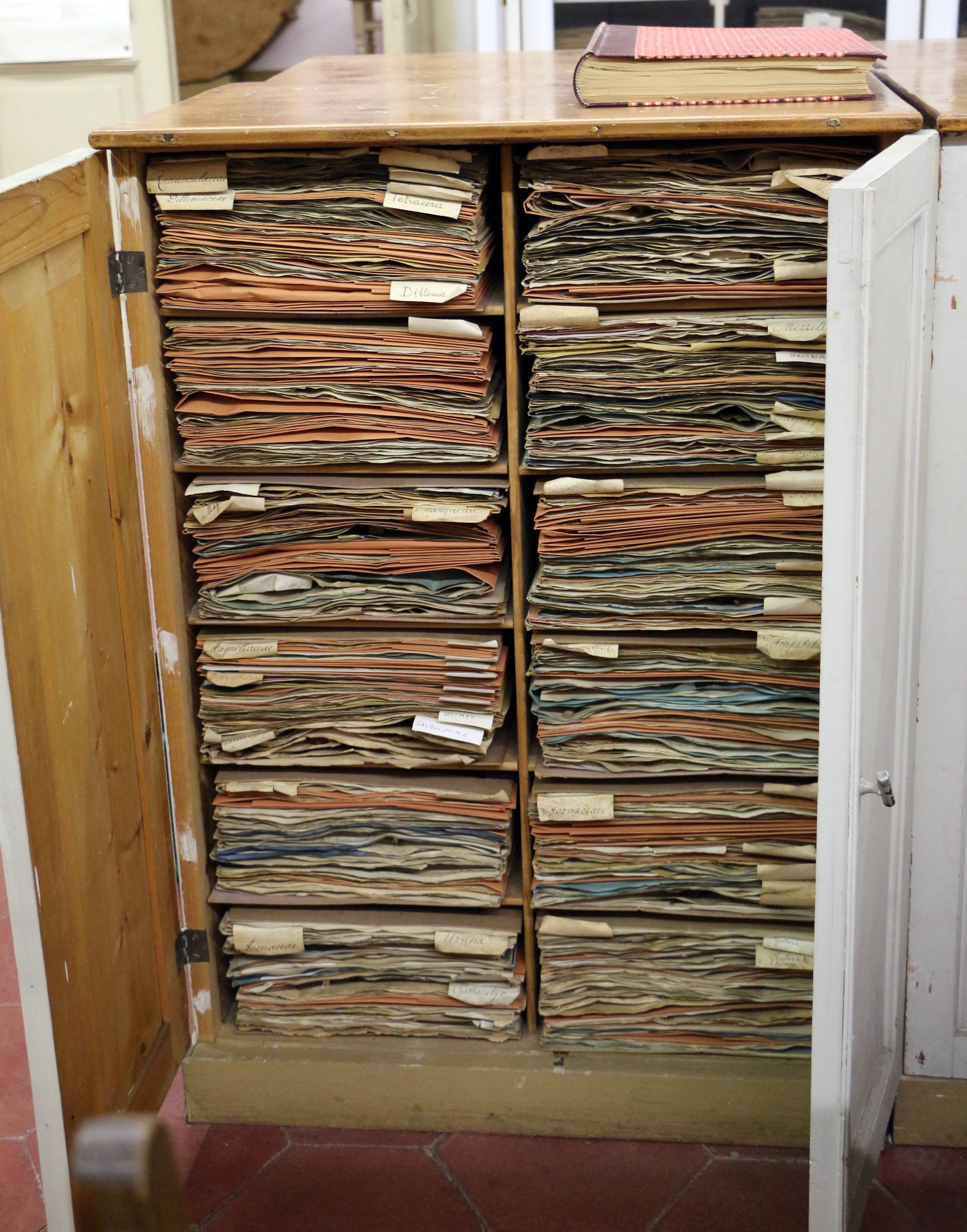
Herbarium of the Museo di Storia Naturale di Firenze

Name	No. Specimens	Abbr.	City	Website
Museo di Storia Naturale di Firenze	3,650,000	FI	Florence	
Università degli Studi di Roma La Sapienza	1,120,000	RO	Rome	
Università degli Studi di Torino	1,000,000	TO	Turin	
Herbarium Mediterraneum Panormitanum	500,000	PAL	Palermo	
Università degli Studi di Padova	300,000	PAD	Padua	
Università di Pisa	300,000	PI	Pisa	
Museo civico di storia naturale di Verona	270,000	VER	Verona	
Università di Camerino	250,000	CAME	Camerino	
Università di Catania	200,000	CAT	Catania	
Centro Studi Erbario Tropicale, Università degli Studi di Firenze	200,000	FT	Florence	
Museo Tridentino di Scienze Naturali	200,000	TR	Trento	
Università degli Studi di Trieste	200,000	TSB	Trieste	
Università di Pavia	180,000	PAV	Pavia	
Università Degli Studi di Napoli Federico II	170,000	NAP	Naples	
Centro Ricerche Floristiche Marche	150,000	PESA	Pesaro	
Università di Bologna	130,000	BOLO	Bologna	
Museo Friulano di Storia Naturale	130,000	MFU	Udine	
Università degli Studi di Roma Tre	118,000	URT	Rome	
Università di Sassari	100,000	SS	Sassari	
Museo Civico di Storia Naturale di Trieste	100,000	TSM	Trieste	
Università degli Studi di Cagliari	80,000	CAG	Cagliari	
Università di Genova	75,000	GE	Genoa	
Università di Siena	75,000	SIENA	Siena	
Università degli Studi di Milano	60,000	MI	Milan	
Museo Civico di Storia Naturale di Genova	55,000	GDOR	Genoa	
Museo Civico di Rovereto	51,000	ROV	Rovereto	
Museo Regionale di Scienze Naturali di Torino	50,000	MRSN	Turin	
Università degli Studi di Napoli	50,000	PORUN	Portici	

== Database ==
The Department of Biology of the University of Trieste houses the National Data Bank for the Italian Flora and Vegetation.

== Botanical gardens ==
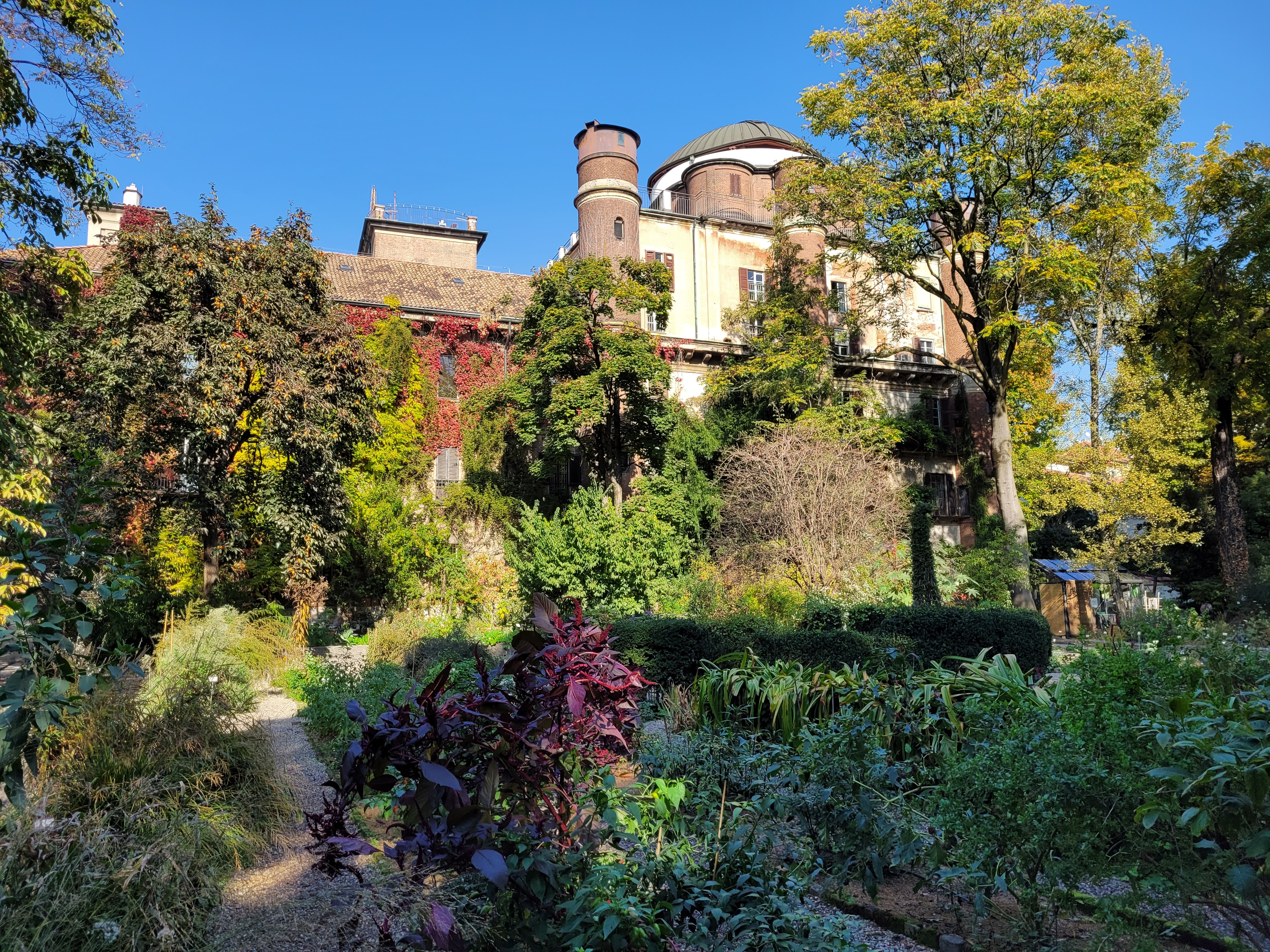
Orto Botanico di Brera, Milan

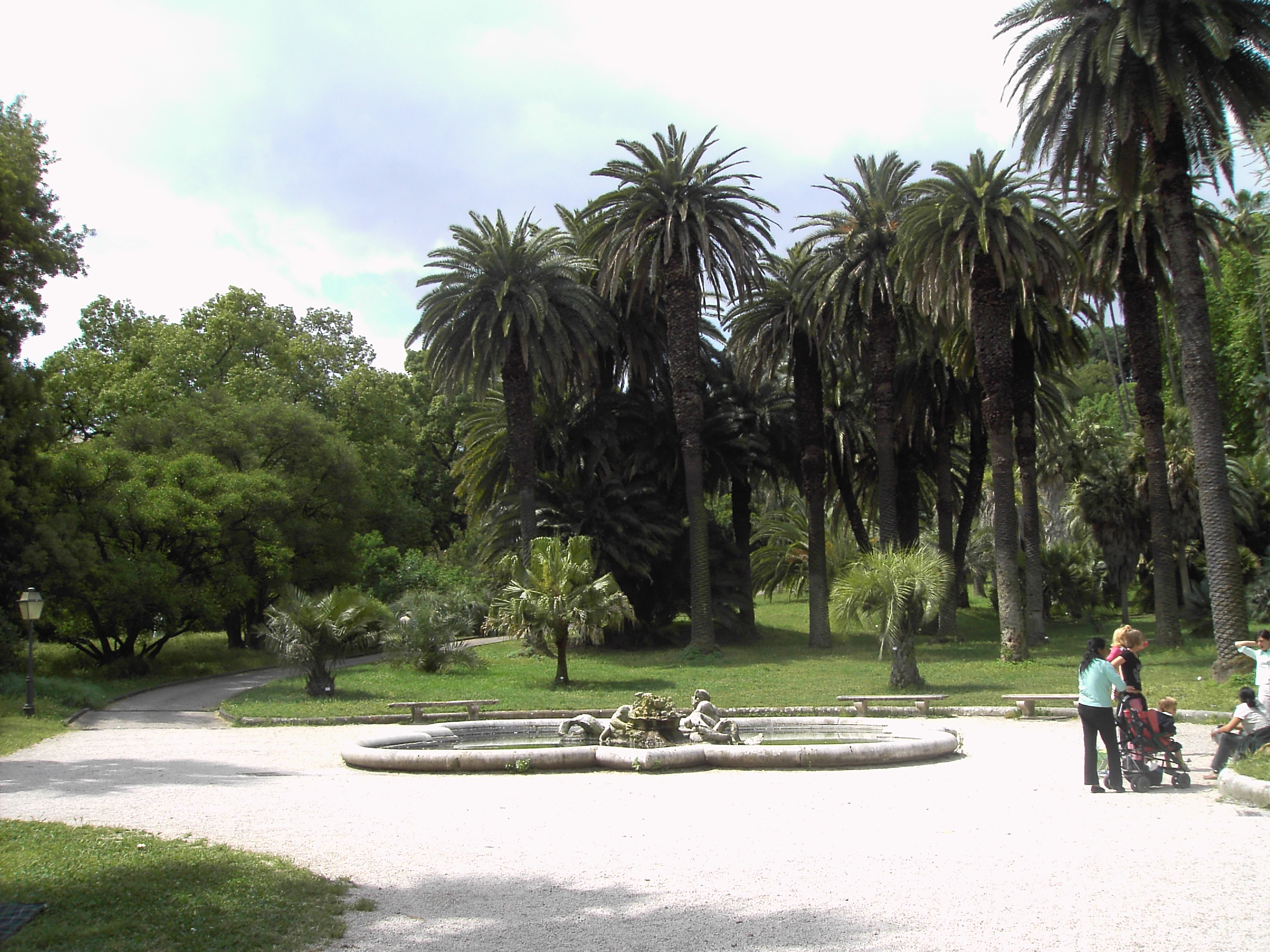
Orto Botanico dell'Università di Roma "La Sapienza"

The most important botanical gardens and arboretums in Italy are:

- Orto Botanico dell'Università di Genova
- Orto Botanico di Padova
- Orto Botanico di Brera, Milan
- Orto Botanico di Cascina Rosa, Milan
- Orto Botanico dell'Università di Bologna
- Orto Botanico dell'Università di Torino
- Giardini Botanici Hanbury, Ventimiglia
- Giardino Botanico Alpino "Rezia", Bormio
- Orto Botanico dell'Università di Roma "La Sapienza"
- Orto Botanico dell'Università di Palermo
- Botanical Garden of Naples
- Orto Botanico dell'Università di Cagliari
- Orto Botanico dell'Università di Catania
- Orto Botanico dell'Università di Trieste
- Orto Botanico di Pisa
- Orto Botanico dell'Università di Bari

== Historic gardens ==
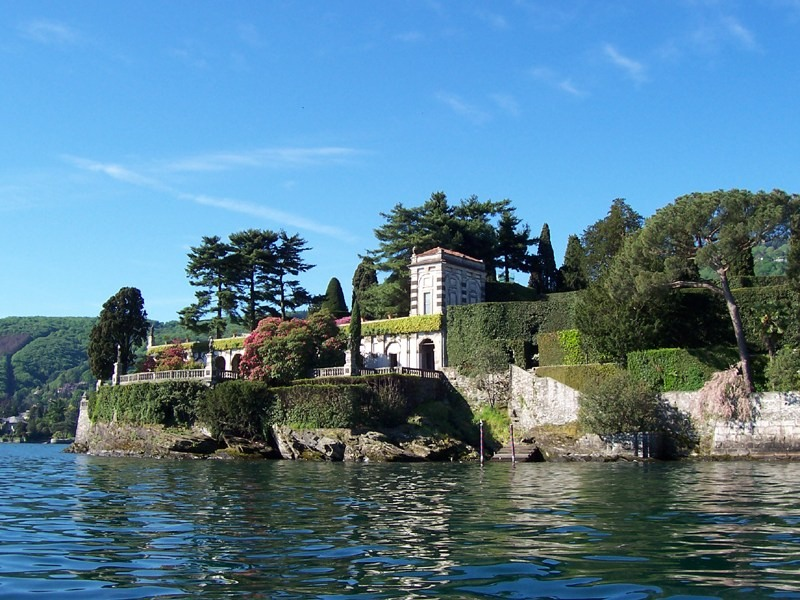
The gardens of Isola Bella, Stresa

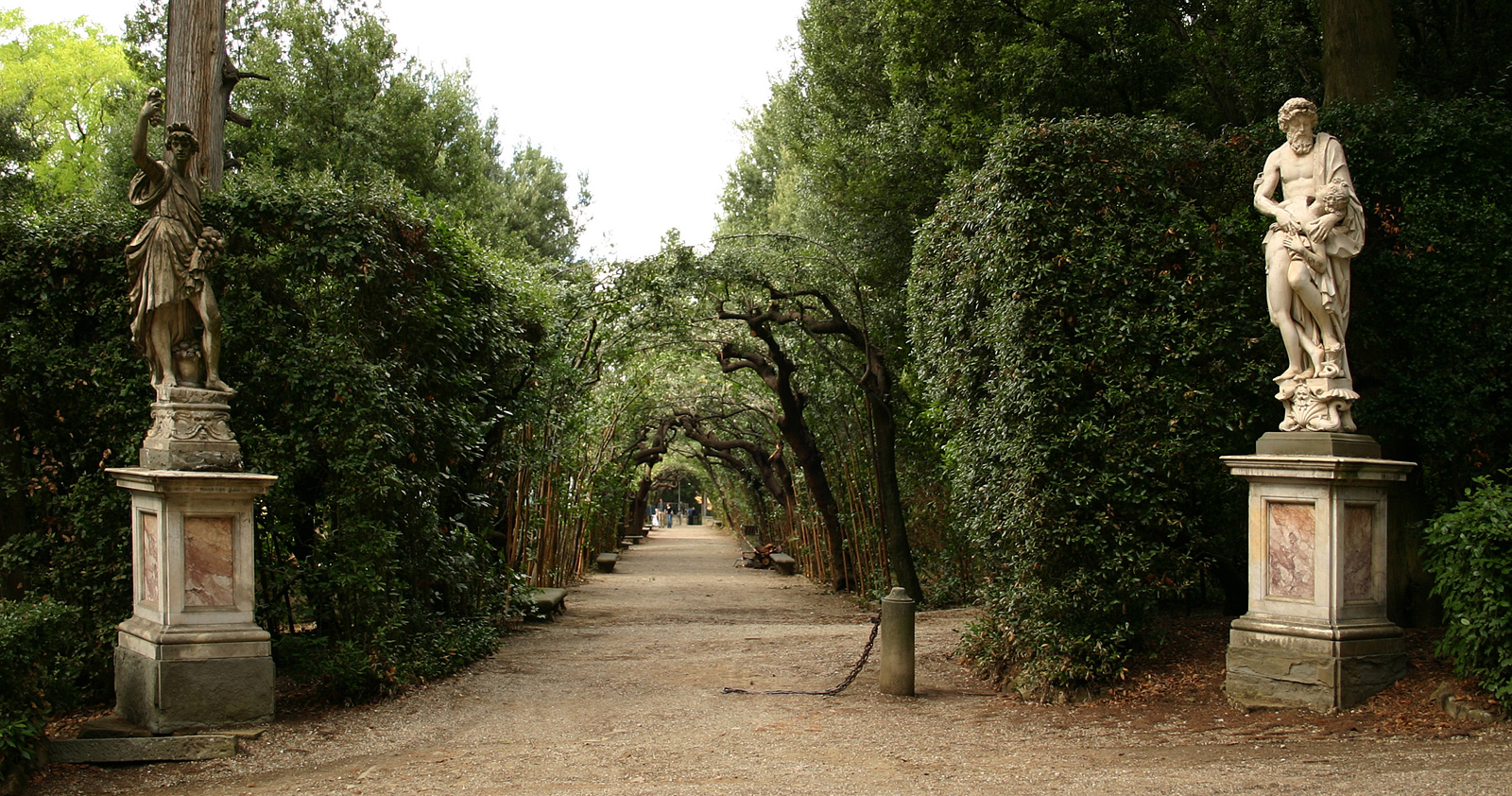
Boboli Gardens, Florence

The Italian garden is stylistically based on symmetry, axial geometry and on the principle of imposing order over nature. It influenced the history of gardening, especially French gardens and English gardens. The Italian garden was influenced by Roman gardens and Italian Renaissance gardens. The most important historic gardens in Italy are:

- Villa Barbarigo, Galzignano Terme
- Trauttmansdorff Castle Gardens, Merano
- Villa d'Este, Tivoli
- Boboli Gardens, Florence
- Isola Bella, Stresa
- Royal Palace of Caserta
- Garden of Ninfa, Cisterna di Latina
- La Mortella, Ischia
- Parco Giardino Sigurtà, Valeggio sul Mincio
- Giardini Botanici di Villa Taranto, Pallanza
- Villa Cetinale, Sovicille
- Villa di Castello, Florence
- Villa Grock, Oneglia
- Villa Carlotta, Tremezzo

== See also ==
- Apennine deciduous montane forests
- Dinaric Mountains mixed forests
- Flora of the Alps
- Geography of Italy
- High Alps
- Illyrian deciduous forests
- Italian sclerophyllous and semi-deciduous forests
- List of national parks of Italy
- Museo del fiore
- Po Basin mixed forests
- South Apennine mixed montane forests
- Tyrrhenian-Adriatic sclerophyllous and mixed forests
- Fauna of Italy
