= Giovanni Arcangeli =

Italian botanist (1840–1921)

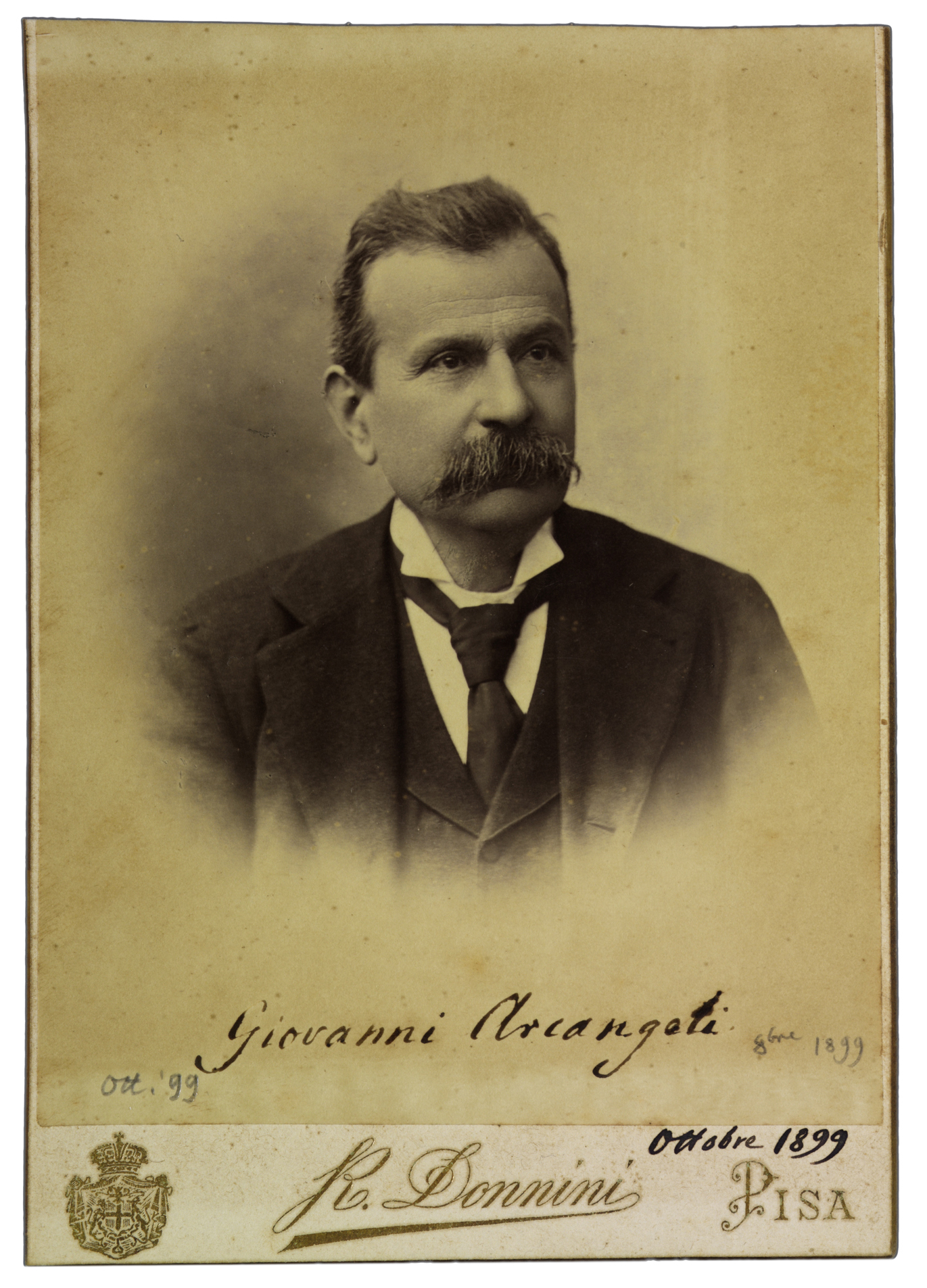
- Born: 18 July 1840
- Died: 16 July 1921 (aged 80)
- Scientific career
- Author abbrev. (botany): Arcang.

Giovanni Arcangeli (18 July 1840 – 16 July 1921) was an Italian botanist from Florence.

In 1862 he earned his degree in natural sciences from the University of Pisa, where he later became an instructor and professor. In 1880 he was a professor of botany at the University of Turin, and in 1882 was appointed director of the Botanical Garden of Pisa.

In 1882 Arcangeli published his best-known work, a highly regarded compendium of Italian flora titled Compendio della flora italiana.

The plant genus Arcangelisia from the family Menispermaceae was named in his honor in 1877. In 1891 Kuntze published Arcangelina but published but this name is now a synonym of Tripogon. Then in 1900, Arcangeliella is a genus of gasteroid fungi in the family Russulaceae was published by Fridiano Cavara. Also Neoarcangelia was published by Berl. in 1900 (part of the Pleurostomataceae family).
