= Orto Botanico dell'Università di Bari =

Botanical garden in Bari, Apulia, Italy

Coordinates: 41.10759°N 16.883073°E

The Orto Botanico di APS Parco Domingo Comunità Empatica e Sostenibile – Bari (in Latin: Hortus botanicus barensis), also known as the Orto Domingo, Orto dei Miracoli, and Hortus Botanicus Barensis, is a botanical garden in Bari, Apulia, Italy. The garden extends over an area of 11,500 m^{2} (1.15 ha), located at via Edoardo Orabona 4 in Bari, in Apulia. It is open Monday through Friday mornings.

The garden was established in 1955, opened in 1960, and in 1964 doubled in size to 11,500 m^{2} (1.15 ha). It is operated by the APS Parco Domingo. The site includes a greenhouse covering an area of about 145 m^{2}, a herbarium with about 40,000 specimens, a hydrophyte area, an experimental area available to researchers, a rock garden, and the Herbarium Horti Botanici Barensis, which contains about 37,000 dried plants.

== Species ==
The garden collections include, among others:

- Aizoaceae – Lithops (about 60 taxa) and similar genera (Conophytum, Dinteranthus, and Gibbaeum)
- Orchidaceae – 33 taxa from the districts of Puglia Gargano, Murgia North-West, Salento and Valle d'Itria. Genera include Aceras, Barlia, Cephalanthera, Dactylorhiza, Himantoglossum, Ophrys, Orchis, Platanthera, and Serapias
- Ornamental and useful plants – Collections of Cycadaceae, Leguminosae, and Musaceae. About 115 taxa of mainly Italian flora, including Grindelia robusta, Levisticum officinale, and Rumex acetosa
- Arecaceae – including Arecastrum romanzoffianum, Butia capitata, Chamaerops humilis, Erythea armata, Jubea chilensis, Livistona chinensis, Rhapis humilis, Sabal palmetto, Phoenix roebelenii, Phoenix dactylifera, Phoenix canariensis, Trachycarpus fortunei, and Washingtonia filifera
- Apulian plants – regional plants including Campanula garganica, Cistus clusii, and Viola graeca
- Four flowerbeds occupied by the genera Abies, Cedrus, Pinus and Cupressus
- Four flowerbeds – arranged symmetrically and bordered by paths on all sides – dedicated mainly to broadleaf species of the genera Acer, Sophora, Acacia, Cercis, Quercus and Tilia
- Aquatic plants
- Papyrus plants, some reaching as much as three meters in height
- Climbing plants such as wisterias, jasmines and bougainvilleas

== See also ==
- List of botanical gardens in Italy
