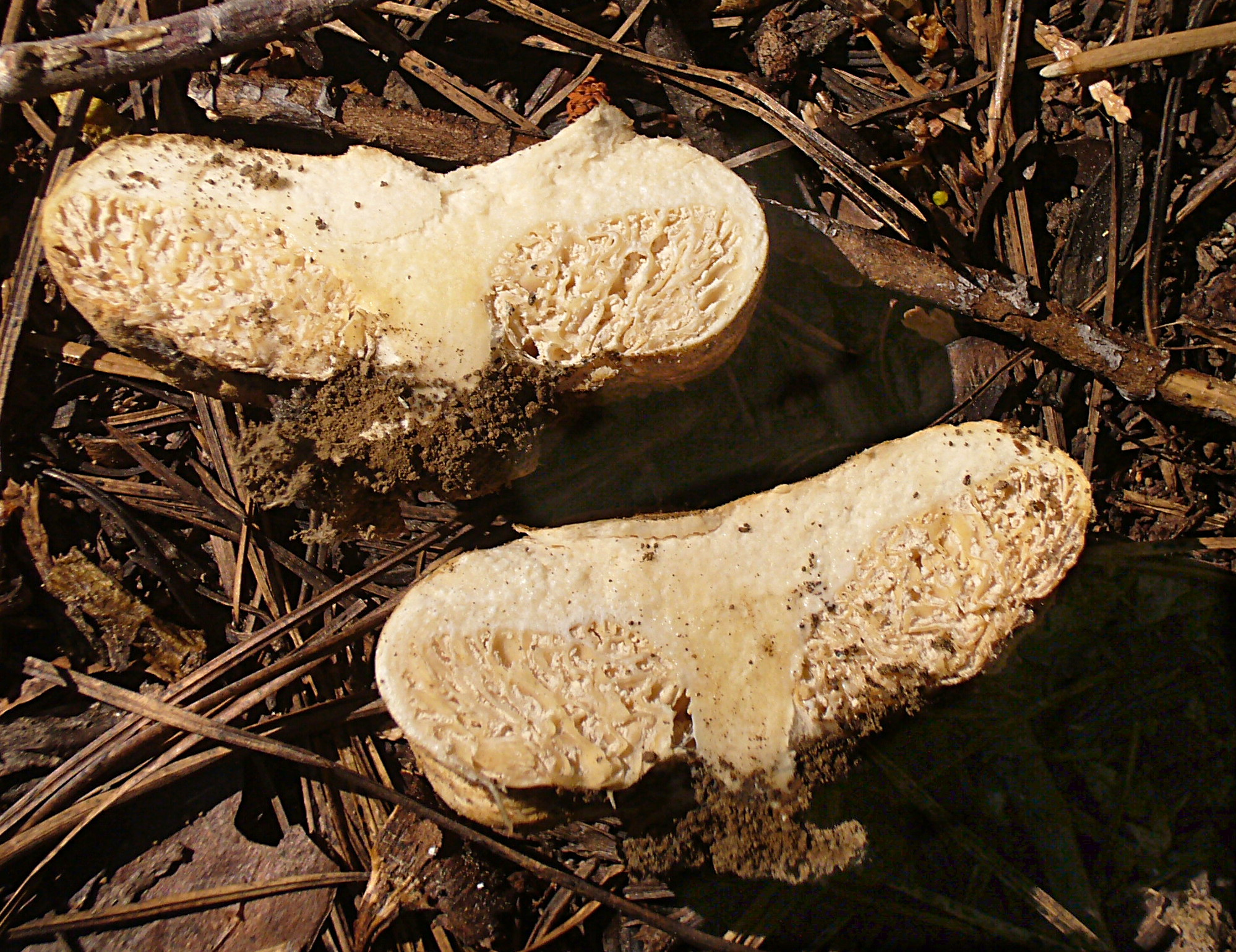
- Arcangeliella crassa

Scientific classification
- Kingdom: Fungi
- Division: Basidiomycota
- Class: Agaricomycetes
- Order: Russulales
- Family: Russulaceae
- Genus: Arcangeliella; Cavara 1900

Type species
- Arcangeliella borziana Cavara 1900

= Arcangeliella =

Genus of fungi

Arcangeliella is a genus of gasteroid fungi in the family Russulaceae. Taxonomic and phylogenetic research has shown that it is very likely a synonym of Lactarius. The type species Arcangeliella borziana was moved to Lactarius in 2003. However, the genus name is still in use for several species for which new combinations have not yet been proposed.

The genus was circumscribed by Fridiano Cavara in Nuovo Giorn. Bot. Ital. ser.2, vol.7 on page 125 in 1900.

The genus name of Arcangeliella is in honour of Giovanni Arcangeli (1840–1921), who was an Italian botanist from Florence.

== Species ==
As accepted by Species Fungorum;

- Arcangeliella ambigua Zeller & C.W. Dodge (1935)
- Arcangeliella beccarii (Petri) Zeller & C.W. Dodge (1935)
- Arcangeliella borziana {{{1}}}
- Arcangeliella brunneola (Harkn.) Zeller & C.W. Dodge (1935)
- Arcangeliella claridgei (Trappe) Trappe & Claridge (2008)
- Arcangeliella corkii (Trappe & Claridge) Trappe & Claridge (2008)
- Arcangeliella curtisii Zeller & C.W. Dodge (1935)
- Arcangeliella daucina (G.W. Beaton, Pegler & T.W.K. Young) J.M. Vidal (2005)
- Arcangeliella ellipsoidea Zeller & C.W. Dodge (1935)
- Arcangeliella laevis (R. Hesse) Zeller & C.W. Dodge (1935)
- Arcangeliella luteocarnea Lloyd (1922)
- Arcangeliella magna (Parks) Zeller (1948)
- Arcangeliella major (J.W. Cribb) J.M. Vidal (2005)
- Arcangeliella mitsueae S. Imai (1957)
- Arcangeliella occidentalis (Harkn.) Zeller & C.W. Dodge (1935)
- Arcangeliella rosea (Harkn.) Zeller & C.W. Dodge (1931)
- Arcangeliella socialis (Harkn.) Zeller & C.W. Dodge (1935)
- Arcangeliella tenax A.H. Sm. & E.L. Wiebe (1963)

Former species; (assume all are Russulaceae family, unless noted)

- A. africana (Lloyd) Zeller & C.W. Dodge (1935) = Neosecotium africanum, Agaricaceae family
- A. alveolata (Cooke & Massee) Zeller & C.W. Dodge (1935) = Zelleromyces alveolatus
- A. asterosperma (Vittad.) Zeller & C.W. Dodge (1935) = Octaviania asterosperma, Boletaceae
- A. asterosperma var. depauperata (Tul. & C. Tul.) Zeller & C.W. Dodge (1935) = Octaviania depauperata, Boletaceae
- A. asterosperma var. hololeuca (R. Hesse) Zeller & C.W. Dodge (1935) = Octaviania asterosperma, Boletaceae
- A. australiensis (Berk. & Broome) C.W. Dodge (1931) = Zelleromyces australiensis
- A. behrii (Harkn.) Zeller & C.W. Dodge (1935) = Xerocomellus behrii, Boletaceae
- A. behrii var. caudata Zeller & C.W. Dodge (1935) = Xerocomellus behrii, Boletaceae
- A. campbelliae Berk. & Broome ex Zeller & C.W. Dodge (1935) = Cortinarius campbelliae, Cortinariaceae
- A. camphorata (Singer & A.H. Sm.) Pegler & T.W.K. Young (1979) = Lactarius silviae,
- A. caudata Zeller & C.W. Dodge (1919) = Chamonixia caudata, Boletaceae
- A. crassa Singer & A.H. Sm. (1961) = Lactarius crassus
- A. cremea Zeller & C.W. Dodge (1935) = Russula dodgei
- A. crichtonii (G.W. Beaton, Pegler & T.W.K. Young) T. Lebel & Castellano (2002) = Lactarius crichtonii
- A. densa R. Heim (1958) = Lactarius densus
- A. densa (R. Heim) Singer & A.H. Sm. (1961) = Lactarius densus
- A. desjardinii Thiers (1984) = Lactarius desjardinii
- A. dolichocaulis Pegler (1982) = Lactarius dolichocaulis
- A. gardneri (Zeller & C.W. Dodge) Zeller & C.W. Dodge (1935) = Lactarius gardneri
- A. giennensis (Mor.-Arr., J. Gómez & Calonge) J.M. Vidal (2005) = Lactarius giennensis
- A. glabrella Zeller & C.W. Dodge (1935) = Zelleromyces glabrellus
- A. hepaticus (G.W. Beaton, Pegler & T.W.K. Young) T. Lebel & Castellano (2002) = Lactarius beatonii
- A. josserandii (Malençon) J.M. Vidal (2005) = Lactarius josserandii
- A. krjukowensis (Bucholtz) Zeller & C.W. Dodge (1935) = Russula krjukowensis
- A. krjukowensis var. michailowskiana (Bucholtz) Zeller & C.W. Dodge (1935) = Russula krjukowensis
- A. lactarioides Zeller (1947) = Lactarius lactarioides
- A. lactifera (B.C. Zhang & Y.N. Yu) J.M. Vidal (2005) = Zelleromyces lactifer
- A. majus (J.W. Cribb) J.M. Vidal (2005) = Arcangeliella major
- A. malaiensis Corner & Hawker (1953) = Zelleromyces malaiensis
- A. nana (Massee & Rodway) Zeller & C.W. Dodge (1935) = Hymenogaster nanus, Hymenogastraceae
- A. nanjingensis (B. Liu & K. Tao) J.M. Vidal (2005) = Russula nanjingensis
- A. oregonensis (Singer & A.H. Sm.) J.M. Vidal (2005) = Zelleromyces oregonensis
- A. papyracea (Singer & A.H. Sm.) J.M. Vidal (2005) = Zelleromyces papyraceus
- A. parva Thiers (1984) = Lactarius paulus
- A. pilosa Zeller & C.W. Dodge (1935) = Russula pilosa
- A. pterospora (E. Horak) J.M. Vidal (2005) = Zelleromyces pterosporus
- A. ramispina (B.C. Zhang & Y.N. Yu) J.M. Vidal (2005) = Zelleromyces ramispinus
- A. ravenelii (Berk. & M.A. Curtis) C.W. Dodge (1931) = Zelleromyces ravenelii
- A. rogersonii (Fogel & States) J.M. Vidal (2005) = Zelleromyces rogersonii
- A. saylorii Thiers (1984) = Lactarius saylorii
- A. scissilis Zeller & C.W. Dodge (1935) = Zelleromyces scissilis
- A. sculptispora (S.L. Mill.) J.M. Vidal (2005) = Zelleromyces sculptisporus
- A. seminuda (Massee & Rodway) Zeller & C.W. Dodge (1937) = Russula seminuda
- A. soederstroemii (Lagerh.) Zeller & C.W. Dodge (1919) = Octaviania soderstromii, Boletaceae
- A. stephensii (Berk.) Zeller & C.W. Dodge (1931) = Lactarius stephensii
- A. stephensii var. borziana (Cavara) Krieglst. (1991) = Lactarius borzianus
- A. tasmanica (Kalchbr. ex Massee) Zeller & C.W. Dodge (1935) = Octaviania tasmanica, Boletaceae
- A. texta (J.W. Cribb) Pegler & T.W.K. Young (1979) = Lactarius textus
- A. variegata Thiers (1979) = Lactarius variegatus
- A. versicaulis (S.L. Mill.) J.M. Vidal (2005) = Zelleromyces versicaulis
- A. violacea (Massee & Rodway) Zeller & C.W. Dodge (1935) = Cortinarius subviolaceus, Cortinariaceae
- A. volemoides K. Mader & A. Mader (1992) = Lactarius borzianus
- A. vulvaria (Petri) Zeller & C.W. Dodge (1935) = Clathrogaster vulvarius, Hysterangiaceae
