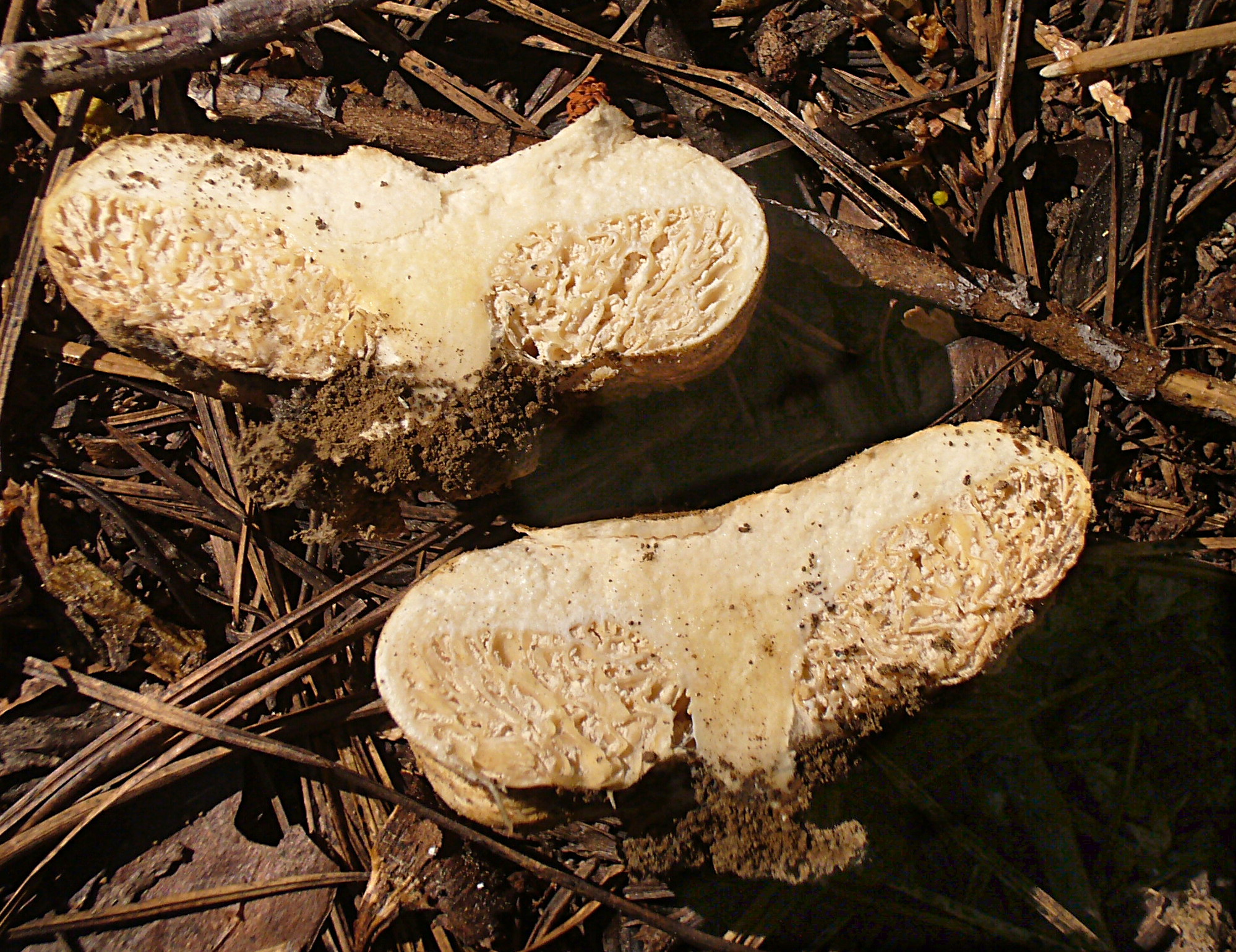

Scientific classification
- Kingdom: Fungi
- Division: Basidiomycota
- Class: Agaricomycetes
- Order: Russulales
- Family: Russulaceae
- Genus: Lactarius
- Species: L. crassus

Binomial name
- Lactarius crassus (Singer & A.H.Sm.) Pierotti 2015

Synonyms
- Gastrolactarius crassus (Singer & A.H.Sm.) J.M.Vidal (2005); Arcangeliella crassa (Singer & A.H.Sm.) (1960)

= Lactarius crassus =

Lactarius crassus
- Mycological characteristics
- Gills on hymenium
- Cap is convex or depressed
- Hymenium attachment is irregular or not applicable
- Stipe is bare
- Spore print is white
- Ecology is mycorrhizal
- Edibility is unknown

Lactarius crassus, commonly known as the gasteroid milk cap, is a North American secotioid fungus species in the family Russulaceae. It was formerly known as part of the Arcangeliella genus, but recent research suggests that the contents of genus Arcangeliella should probably be transferred into the genus Lactarius. It was described from a collection made in Stanislaus National Forest, Northern California.

The buff cap is up to 8 centimetres (3 1/4 in) wide and the stipe is up to 2.5 cm long. The spore mass is collected in the rudimentary gills, which are pinkish to yellowish; a spore print is unobtainable. The flesh has an acrid taste, implying it to be inedible.
