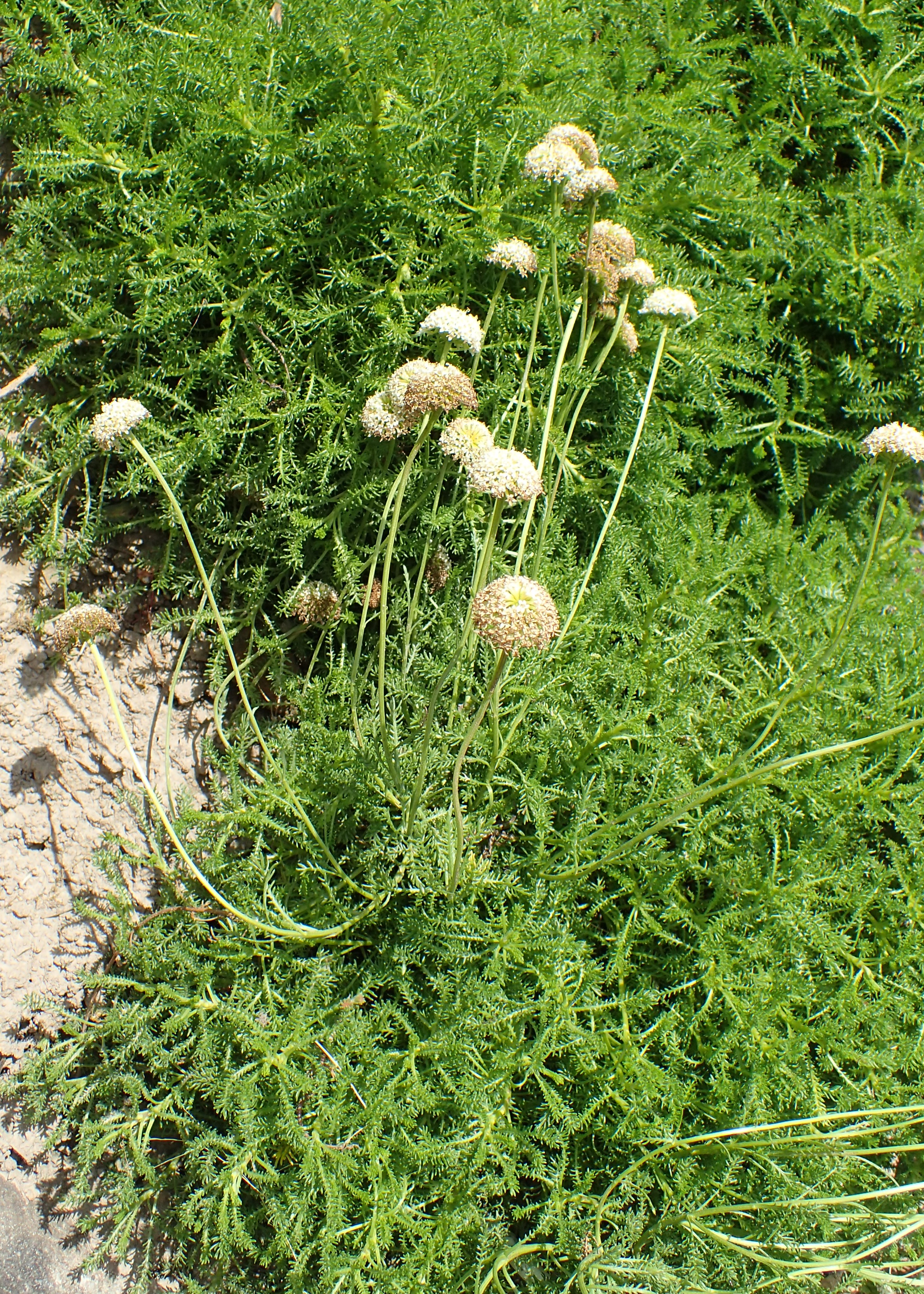
- At the Maria Curie-Skłodowska University botanical garden
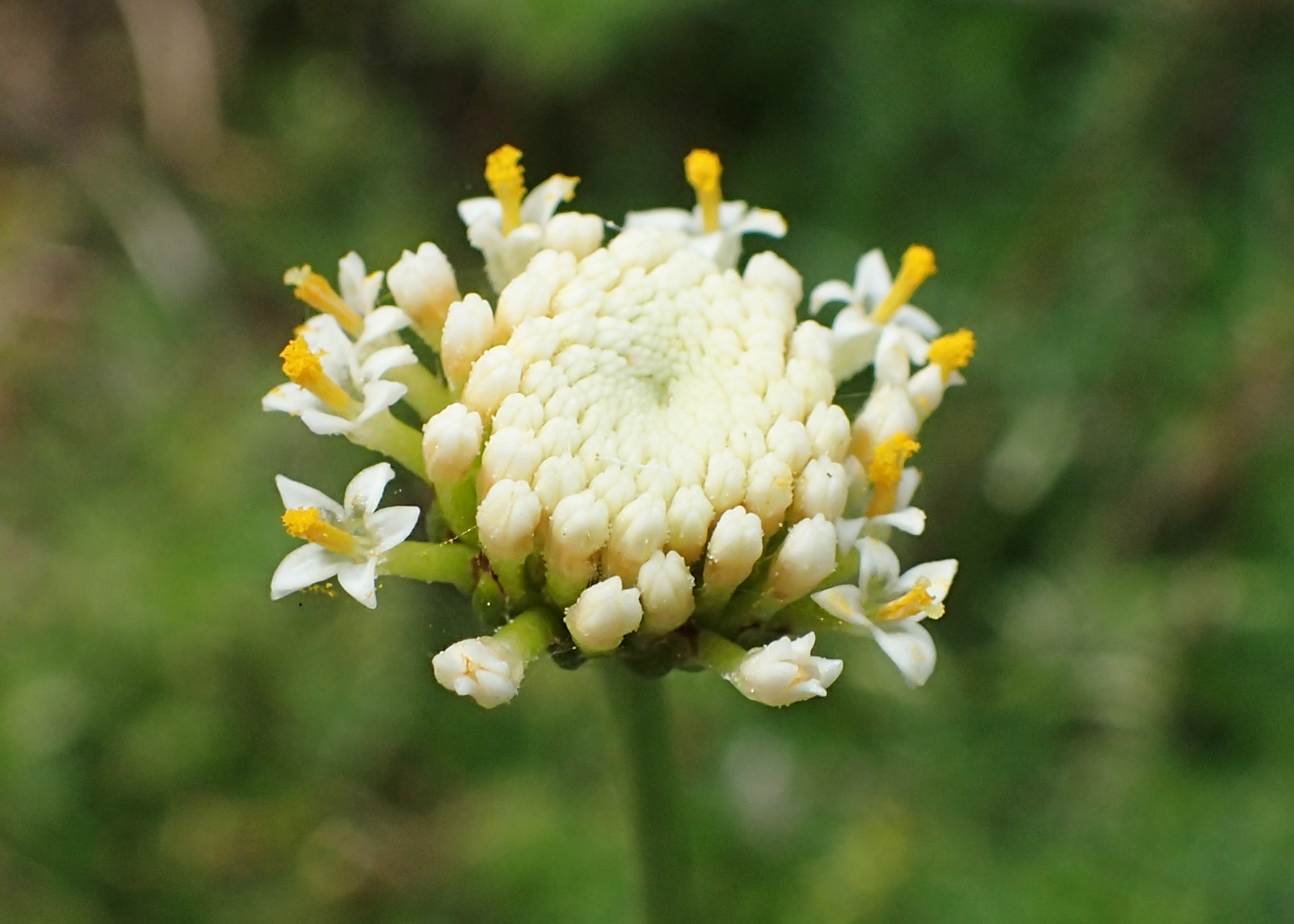
- Close up of inflorescence

Scientific classification
- Kingdom: Plantae
- Clade: Embryophytes
- Clade: Tracheophytes
- Clade: Angiosperms
- Clade: Eudicots
- Clade: Asterids
- Order: Asterales
- Family: Asteraceae
- Genus: Santolina
- Species: S. pinnata

Binomial name
- Santolina pinnata Viv.

Synonyms
- Santolina leucantha Bertol.

= Santolina pinnata =

Species of flowering plant

Santolina pinnata, called lavender cotton along with other members of its genus, is a species of flowering plant in the family Asteraceae, native to northwest Italy. Its putative subspecies Santolina pinnata subsp. neapolitana, the rosemary-leaved lavender cotton, has gained the Royal Horticultural Society's Award of Garden Merit.
