= Galium glaucophyllum =

Sardinian bedstraw

Scientific classification
- Kingdom: Plantae
- Clade: Tracheophytes
- Clade: Angiosperms
- Clade: Eudicots
- Clade: Asterids
- Order: Gentianales
- Family: Rubiaceae
- Genus: Galium
- Species: G. glaucophyllum

Binomial name
- Galium glaucophyllum Em.Schmid

Species of plant

Galium glaucophyllum, the Sardinian bedstraw, is a species of plant in the family Rubiaceae. It is endemic to the island of Sardinia in the Mediterranean.

Galium glaucophyllum is an erect to recumbent, perennial herb up to 50 cm tall. Leaves are generally in whorls of 6, narrowly lanceolate and waxy, generally thick and succulent. Flowers are white, in large terminal panicles.
