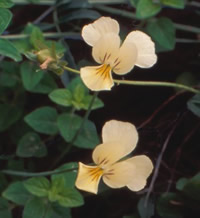

Conservation status
- Critically Endangered (IUCN 3.1)

Scientific classification
- Kingdom: Plantae
- Clade: Tracheophytes
- Clade: Angiosperms
- Clade: Eudicots
- Clade: Rosids
- Order: Malpighiales
- Family: Violaceae
- Genus: Viola
- Species: V. ucriana

Binomial name
- Viola ucriana Erben & Raimondo

= Viola ucriana =

Species of flowering plant

Viola ucriana is a species of plant in the Violaceae family. It is a violet that is endemic to Sicily in Italy, where its known in Italian as Viola di Ucria.

== Distribution ==
Viola ucriana is only found on Mount Pizzuta, near Palermo in north-western Sicily, growing above the Piana degli Albanesi at an elevation of 800–1,300 metres (2,600–4,300 ft). Its natural habitats are in Mediterranean shrubby vegetation and rocky areas here.

Endangered

The only known populations are in two localities, covering a total area of 0.2 square kilometres (0.077 mi^{2}). It is an IUCN Red List Critically Endangered plant species and IUCN Top 50 Campaign Mediterranean Island Plants, threatened by habitat loss.

== Description ==
Viola ucriana is perennial, evergreen herbaceous plant, with elongated upper leaves and lower leaves gathered forming a cushion at the base. The greyish green leaves are partially hairy. The flowers are yellow, with yellowish-green spur. The plants predominantly flowers in late Spring, between April and June.

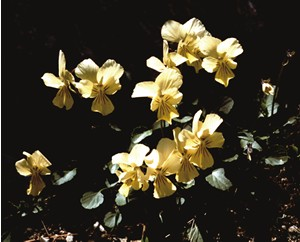
The Viola di Ucria of Sicily.
