= Museo del fiore =

Museum in Lazio, Italy

Coordinates: 42.7397°N 11.9244°E

Museo del Fiore
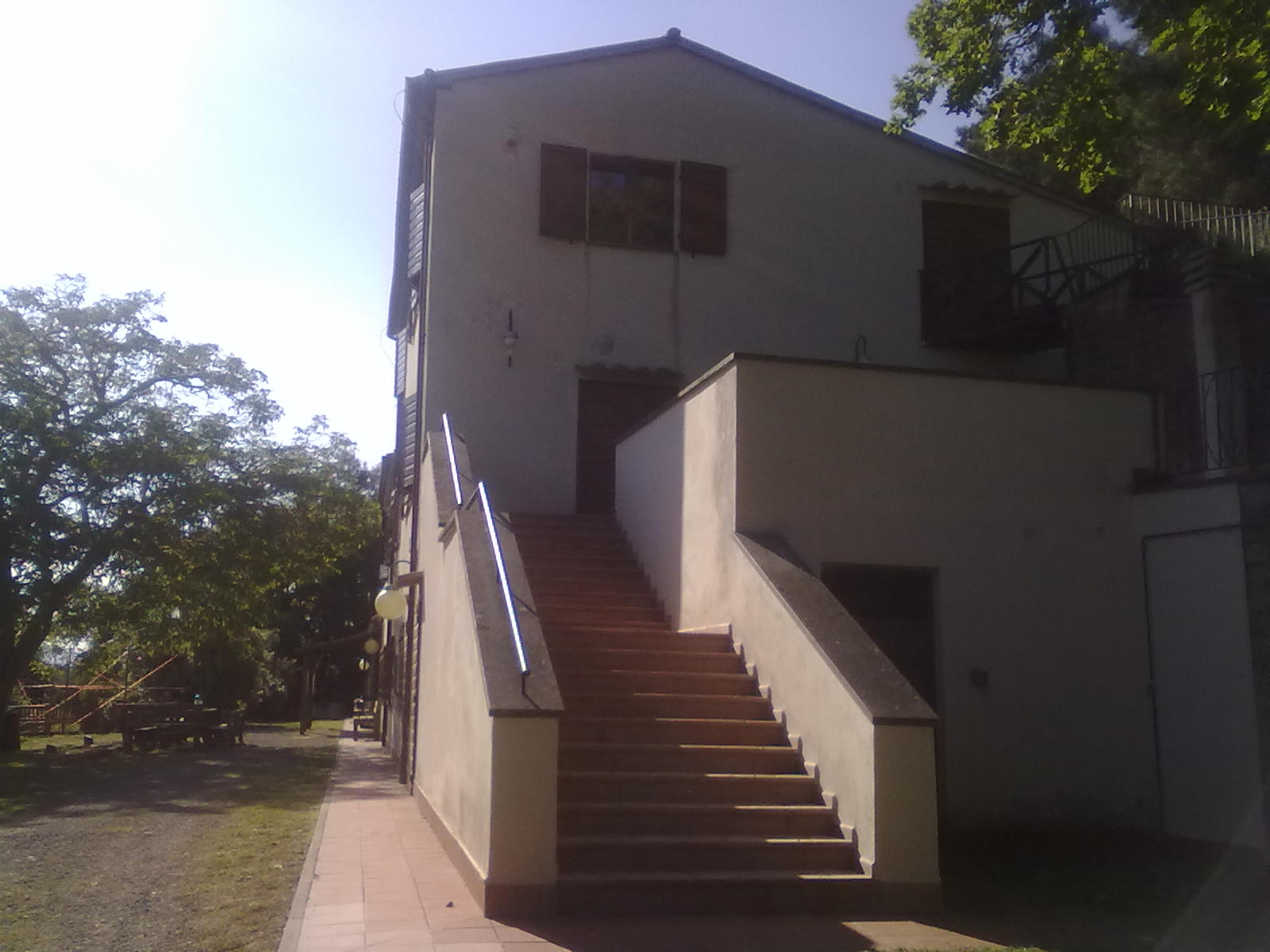
- Established: 1995
- Location: Monte Rufeno natural reserve, Viterbo
- Type: Naturalistic

The Museo del Fiore is a small naturalistic, multimedial and interactive museum, located in Italy, in the woods of the Monte Rufeno natural reserve which is 10 km from Acquapendente (Viterbo) and 2 km from the characteristic medieval city of Torre Alfina. It is inside an old rural building, "Casale Giardino". With more than 1,000 species of known plants in its territories and rare animals, the Monte Rufeno natural reserve, at the border with Umbria and Tuscany, is an area with a large variety of plants and wildlife.

The museum was created thanks to the many blooms of the reserve and the deep link that flowers and plants have within the local culture, which is expressed with the Pugnaloni of Acquapendente (a big mosaic composed with petals and leaves inspired by the dream of freedom from the oppression, made in honor of Our Lady of the Flower, which is celebrated every year on the third Sunday of May).

== Aims ==
The museum aims to raise awareness of the environmental heritage of the area and function as an archive of biodiversity. It offers activities and meetings with school and families that combine the discovery and knowledge of the natural world with the intention to conserve nature. Visiting the area is easy: the flower trail is a loop route which takes the visitors to different stops, to the botanical garden and the picnic area. The museum also organizes summer camps.

== Sections ==
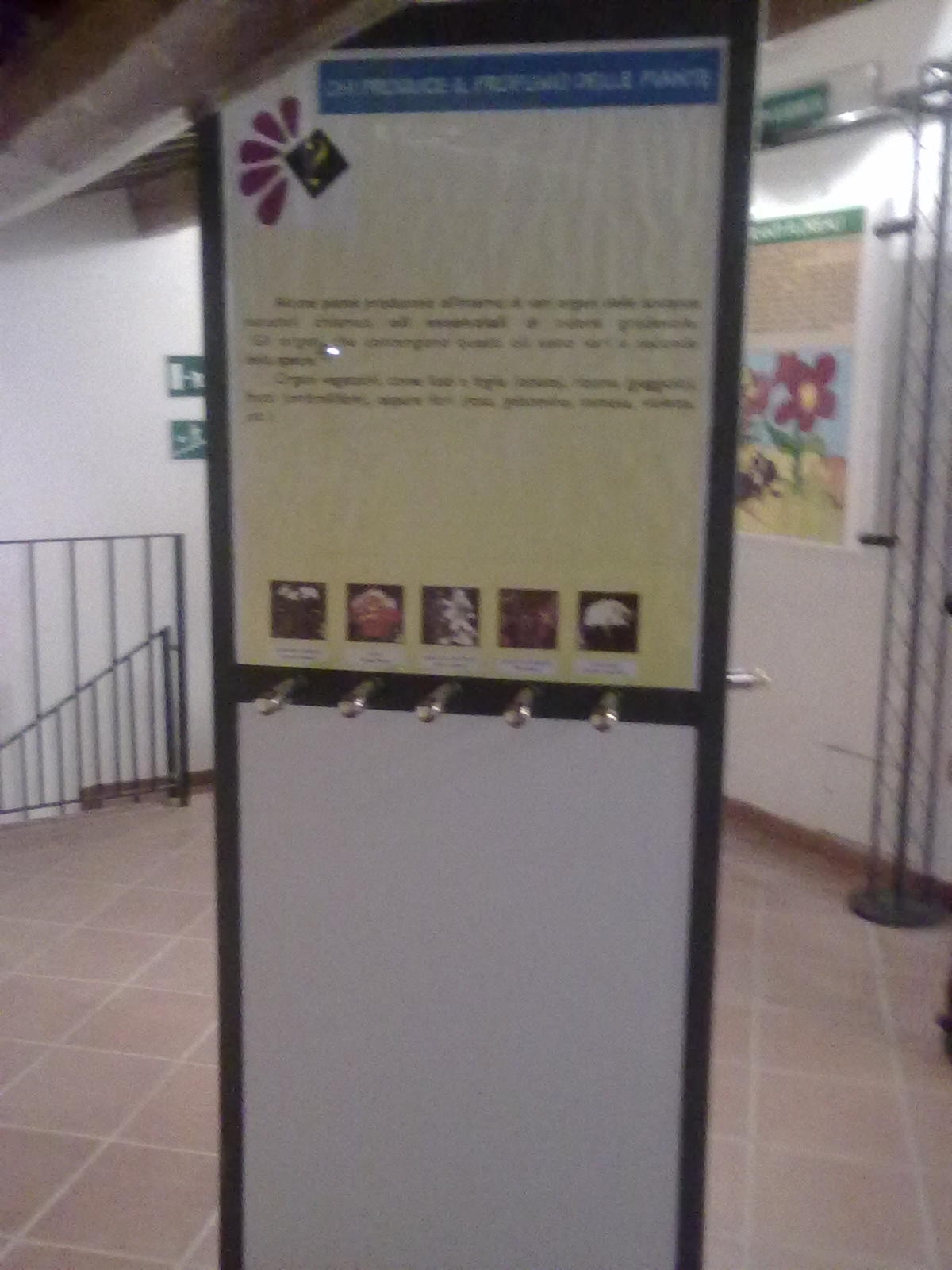
Perfume box

The Museum of Flowers is divided into several sections, each covering different themes and using a variety of media: photos, illustrations, models, panels and tools. The museum is equipped with laboratories, a projection room, and play room, to allow visitors to observe and interact directly with nature.

=== The World of flowers ===
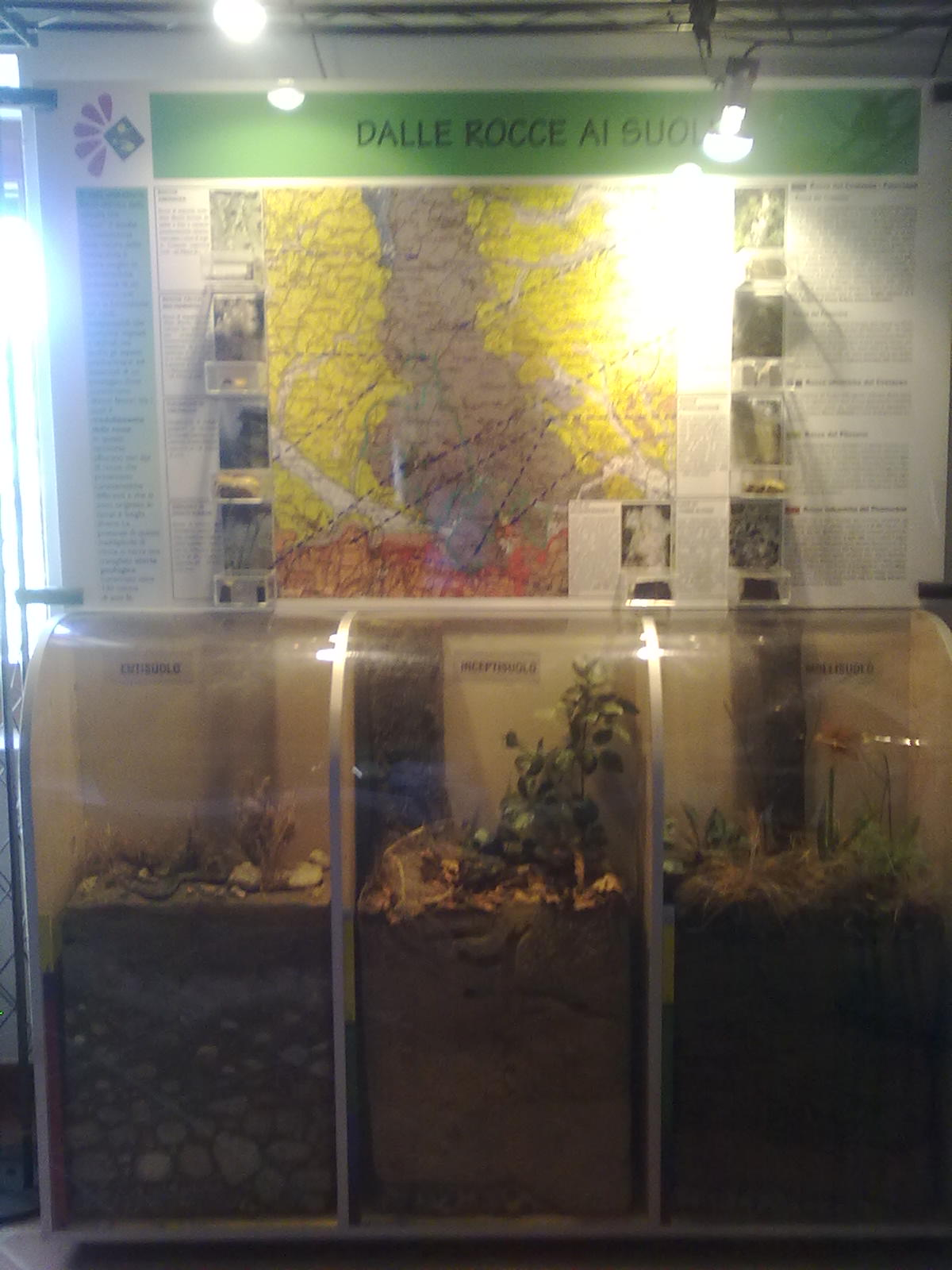
Instruments museum

In this section are plastic reconstructions of flowers and insects. It aims to help discover the secrets of the flowers and to understand the importance of flowers and of nature. In this part of the museum visitors can also find out how plants and flowers change over time and how they react to different habitats.

=== The flowers of the Natural Reserve ===
The centre of this section is a herbarium which contains over 300 specimens of dried plants representing the local flora.

=== The evolution of plant forms and flowers ===
This section allows the visitors to understand deeply what a flower is and how it works, through 3D reproductions of a cell and different flowers. The "evolution tree" demonstrates the origin of the flowers, from primitive forms such as the magnolia to more complex ones, like orchids.

=== Flowers and insects ===
This section tries to explain why the nature makes flowers so beautiful and fragrant. The answer is simple: to attract insect which, unaware, move pollen from one plant to the next, allowing the plants to reproduce.

=== The ecological relations ===
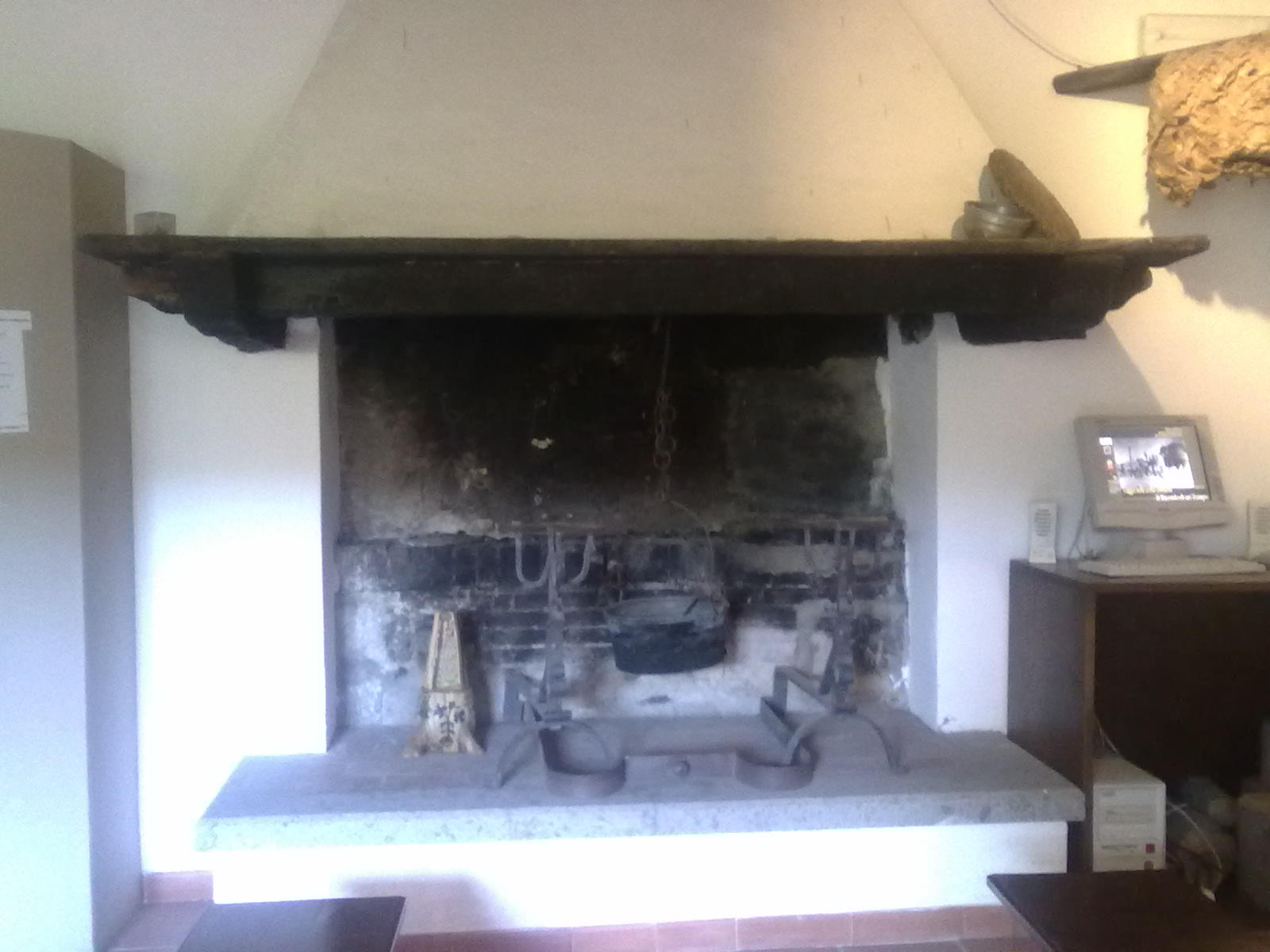
The fireplace

Flowers are a key part of the life and are closely linked to other natural elements such as soil, water, rocks, wind animals, and mushrooms. The museum offers the opportunity to admire the beauty of nature thanks to its exhibitions of trees, soil and plants. Visitors can also learn the way bees live and interact in their social system, enjoying a series of comprehensive panels on the large outdoor terrace. Children can listen to stories and legends of local populations.

=== The flowers and man ===
This section shows a great multimedia daisy whose petals are each a workstation. The workstations are multimedia archives which analyse the relationship between man and flowers in mythology, religion, folklore and history. The section ends with an insight of the local celebration of Pugnaloni.

=== Curiosity shop ===
In this section visitors can smell the fragrances of many endangered plants and can discover the importance of conversation of endangered species. Many plants bear surprising flowers. In this room the clock of flowers marks the daily life of plants: some flowers open at night, and others come to life at dawn.

=== Educational workshop and playroom ===
In the laboratory children and adults can have a close look at nature through microscopes, instruments and artefacts.

=== The flower trail and outdoor spaces ===
Outdoor a long path guides the visitors to discover the features of local plants and flowers. It is 3 kilometers long and full of informative panels. The path leads to the beautiful old mell, now restored. Finally, in the large garden surrounding the museum, is a picnic area with tables.

== Gallery ==
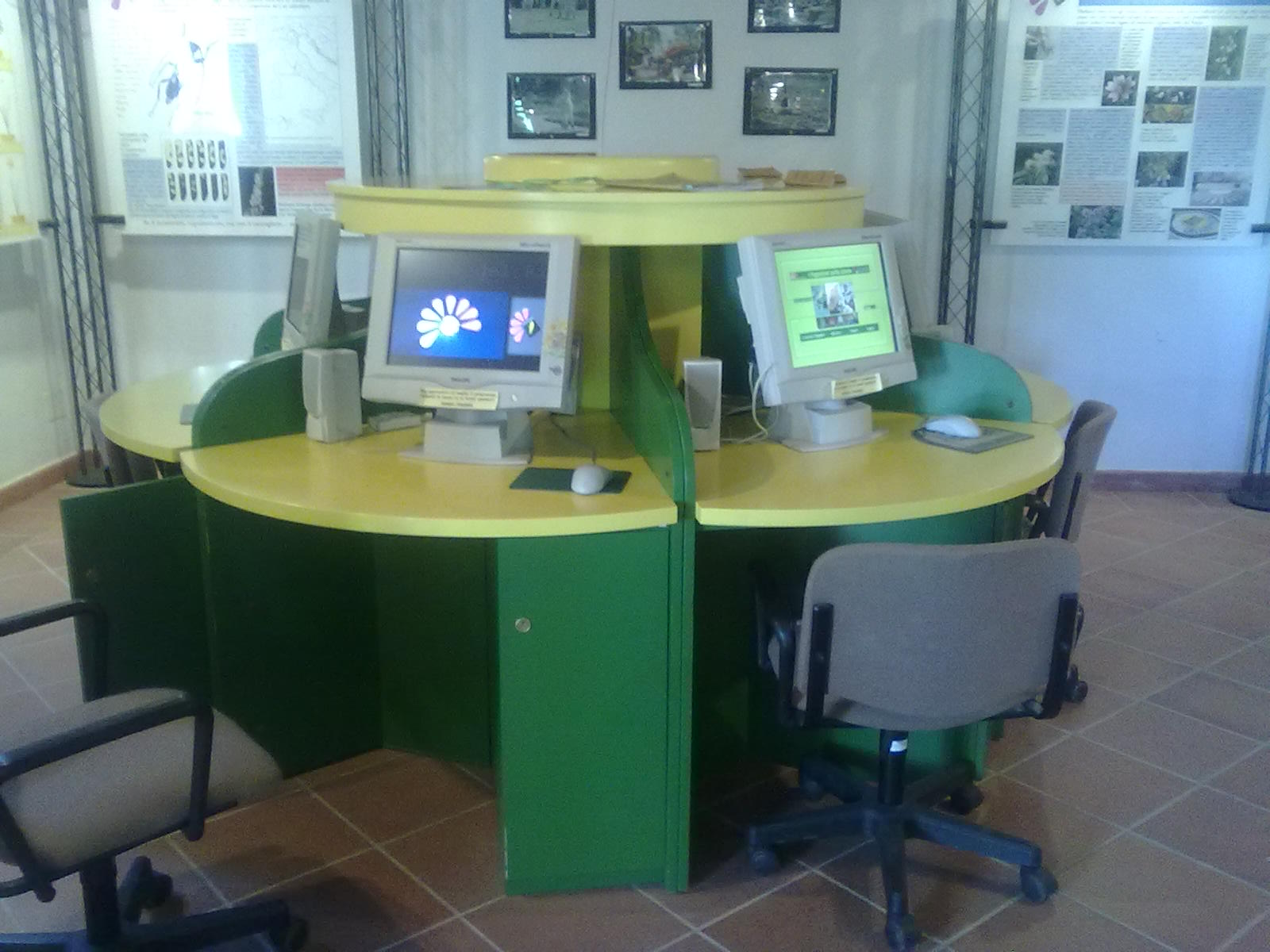

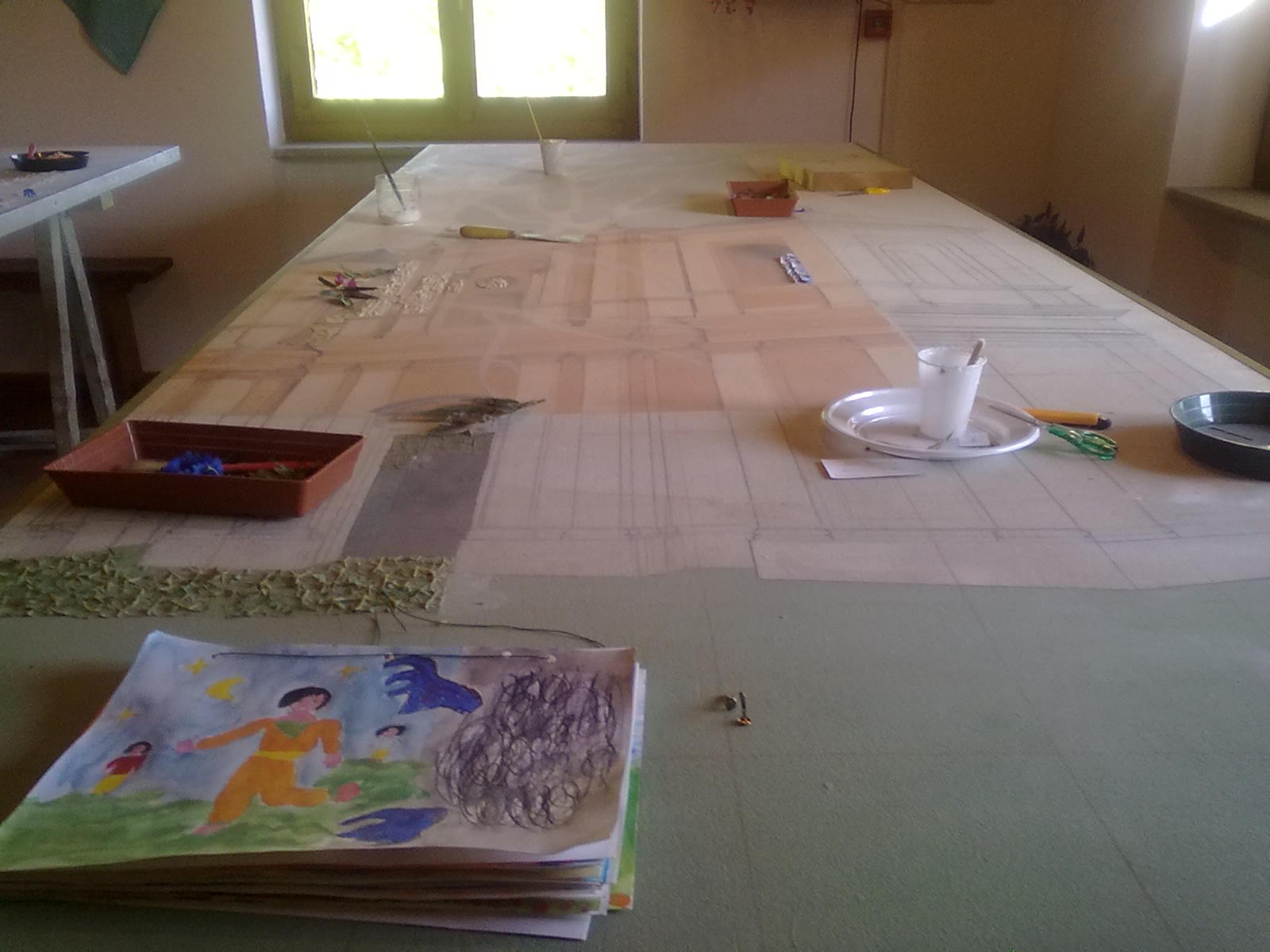

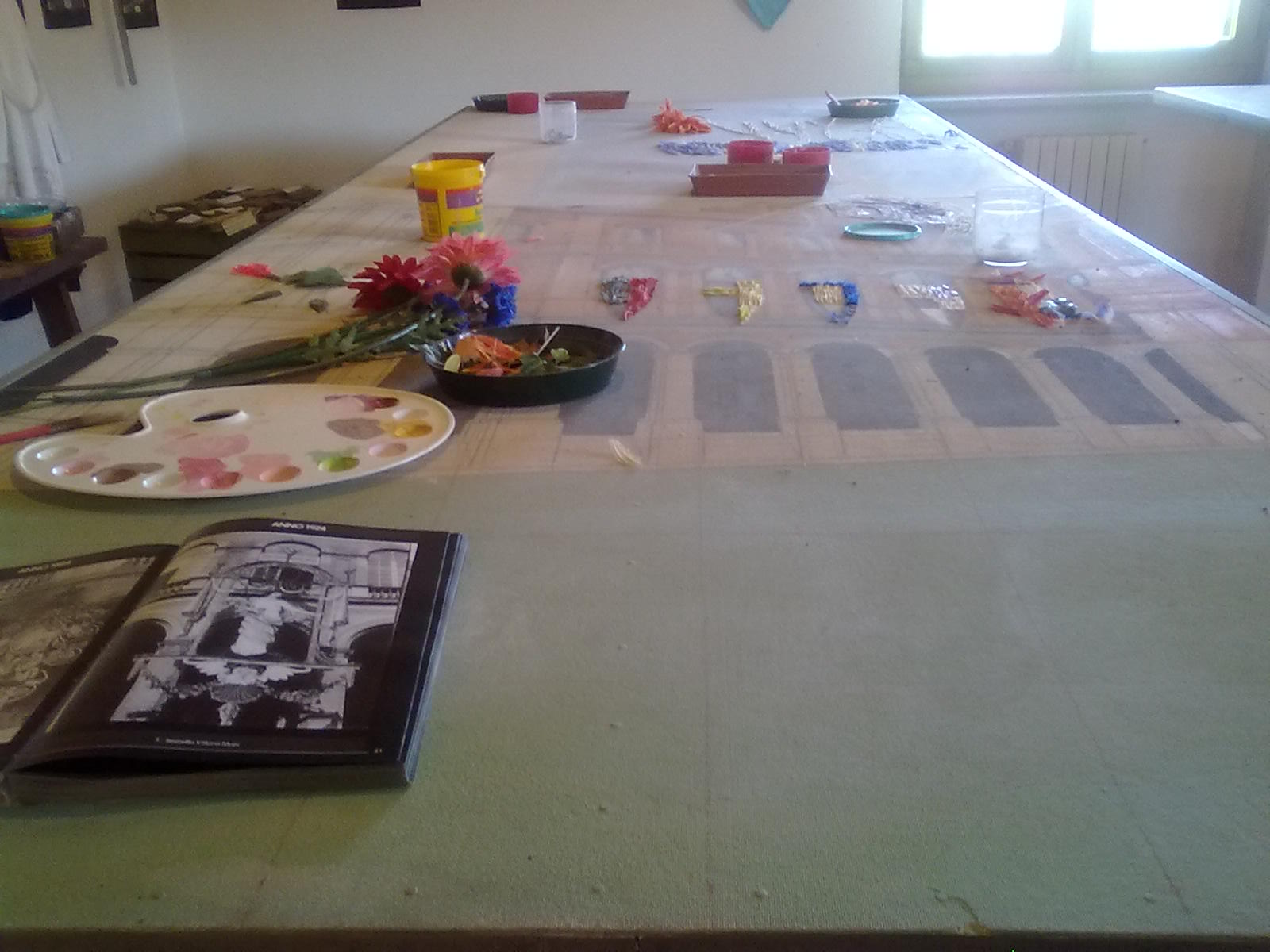

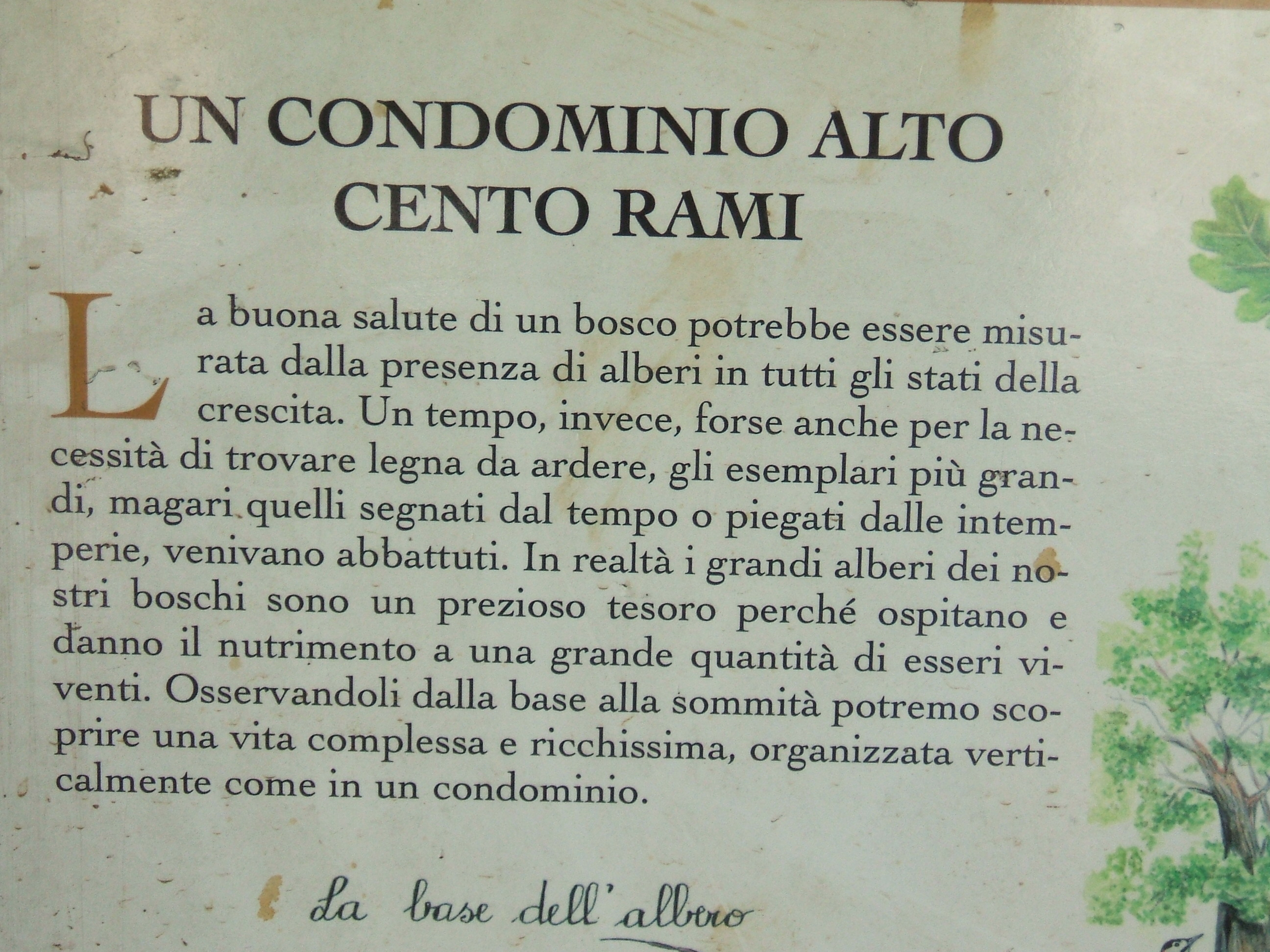

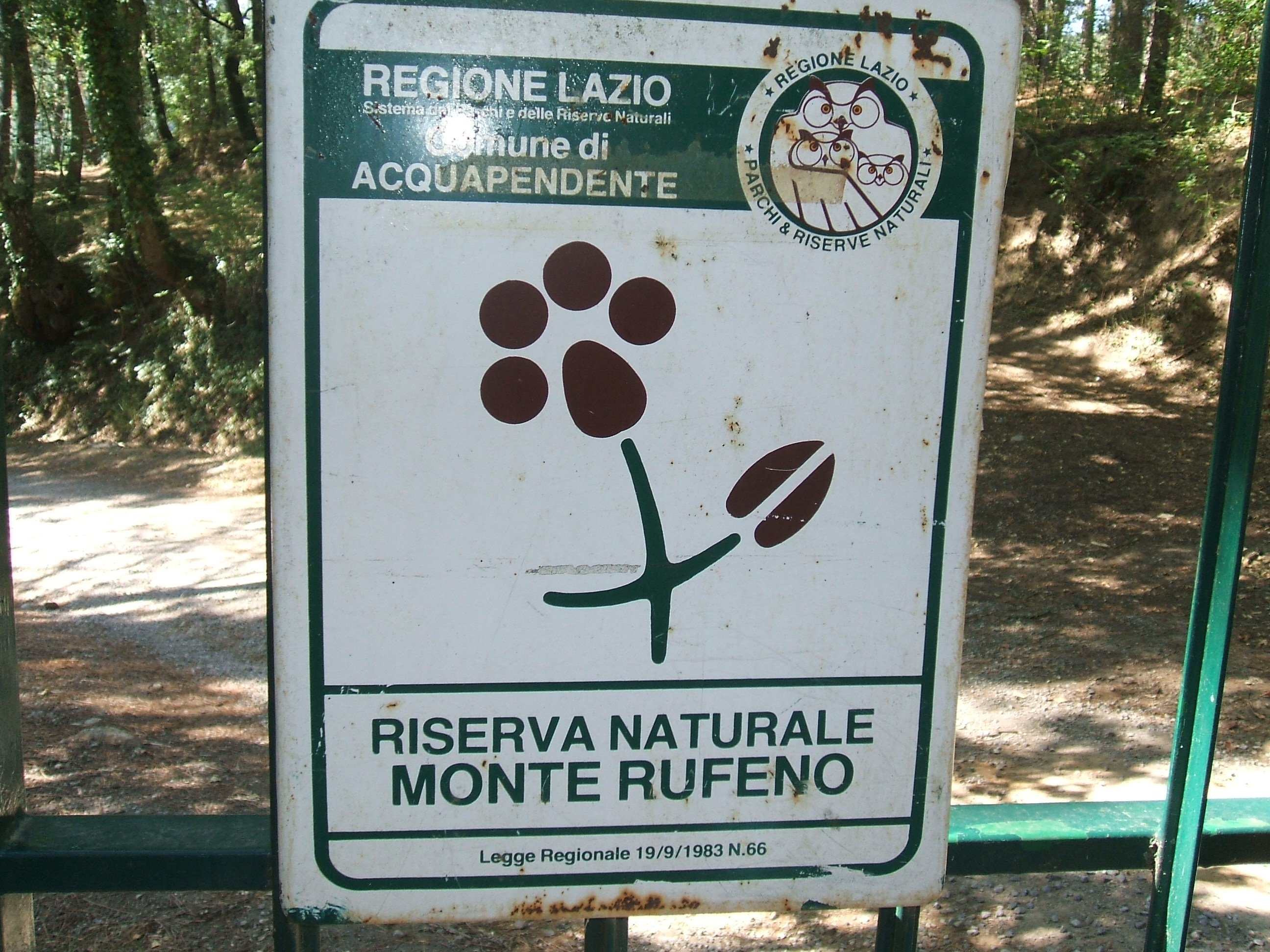

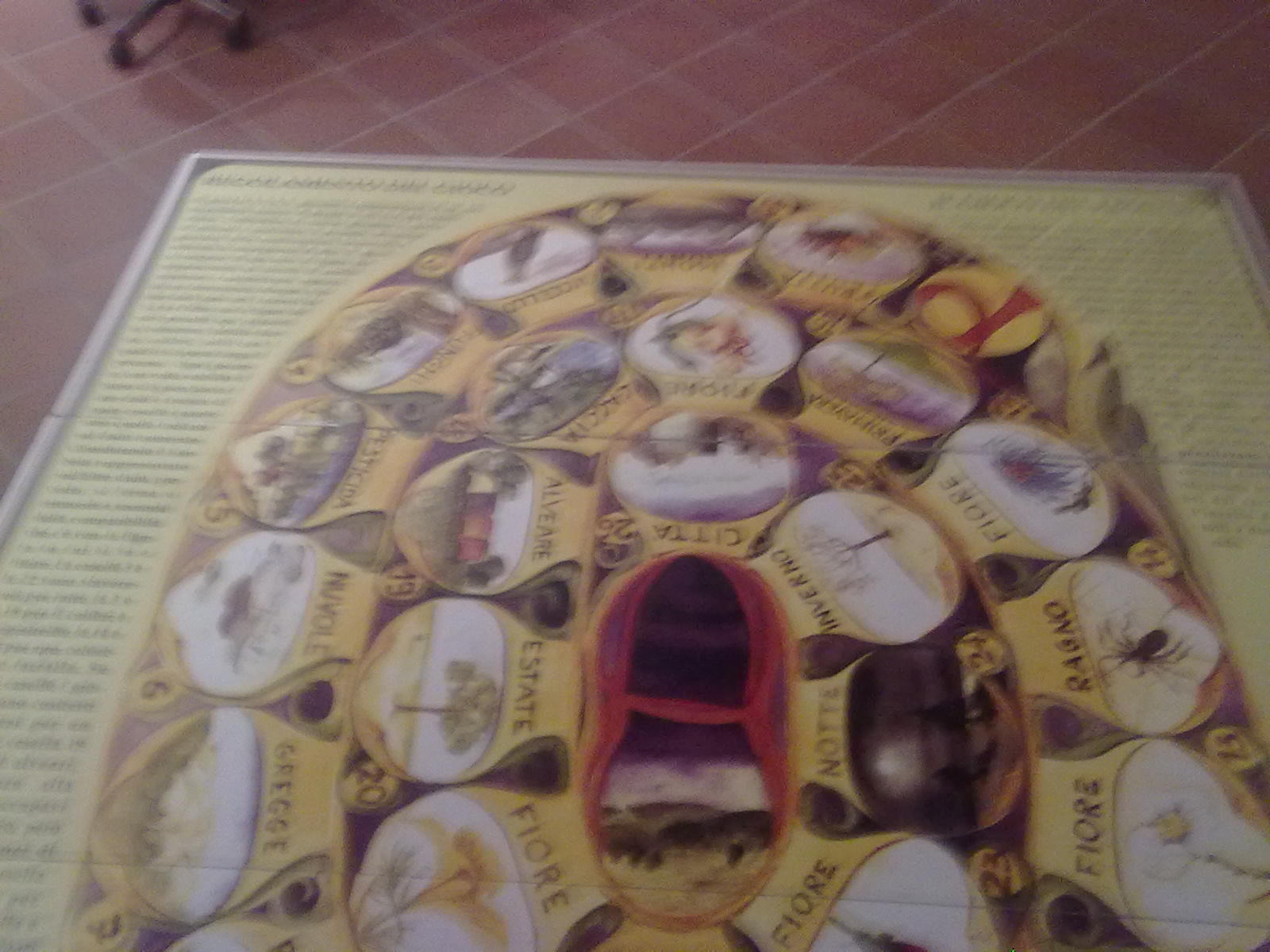

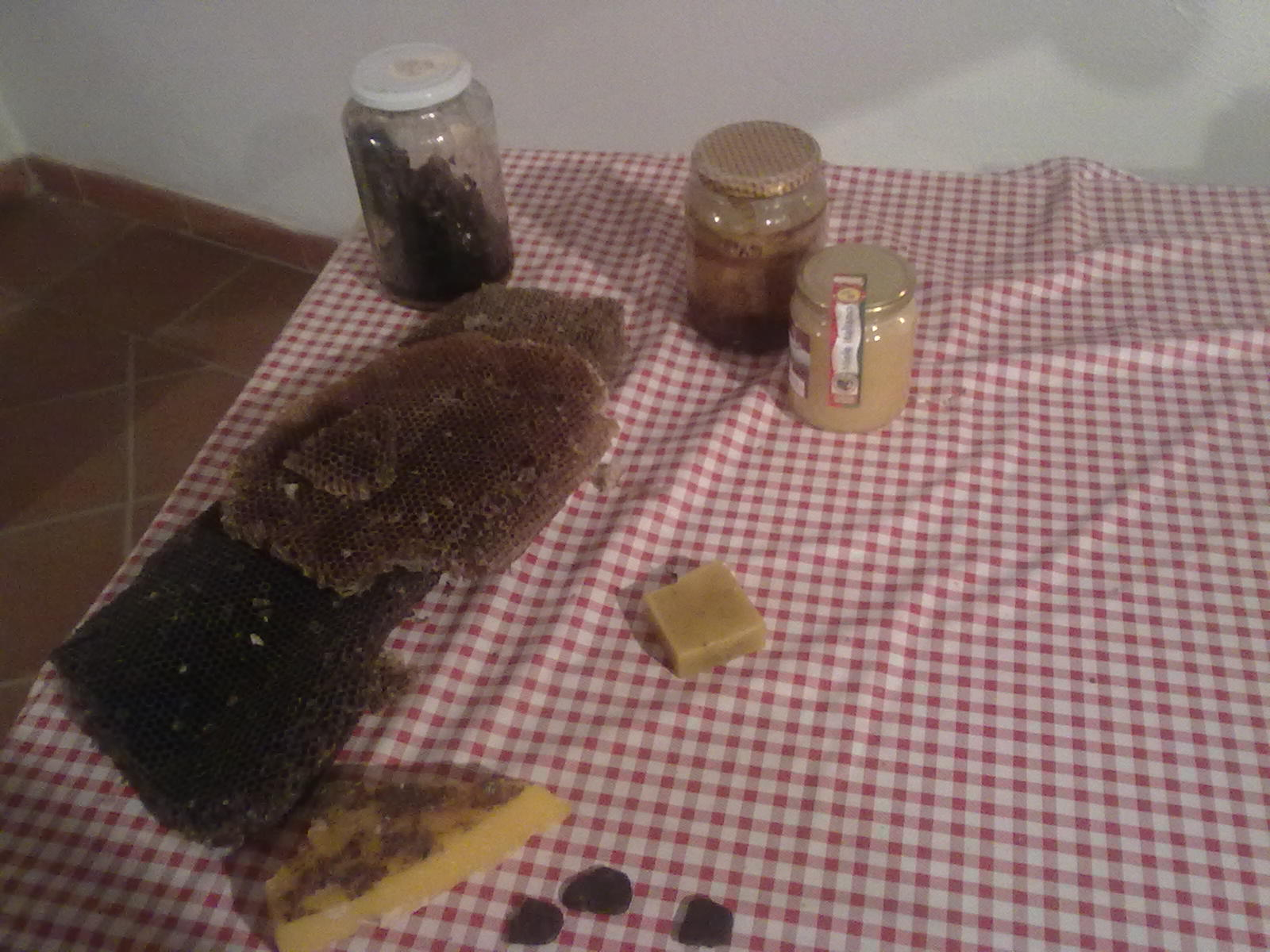

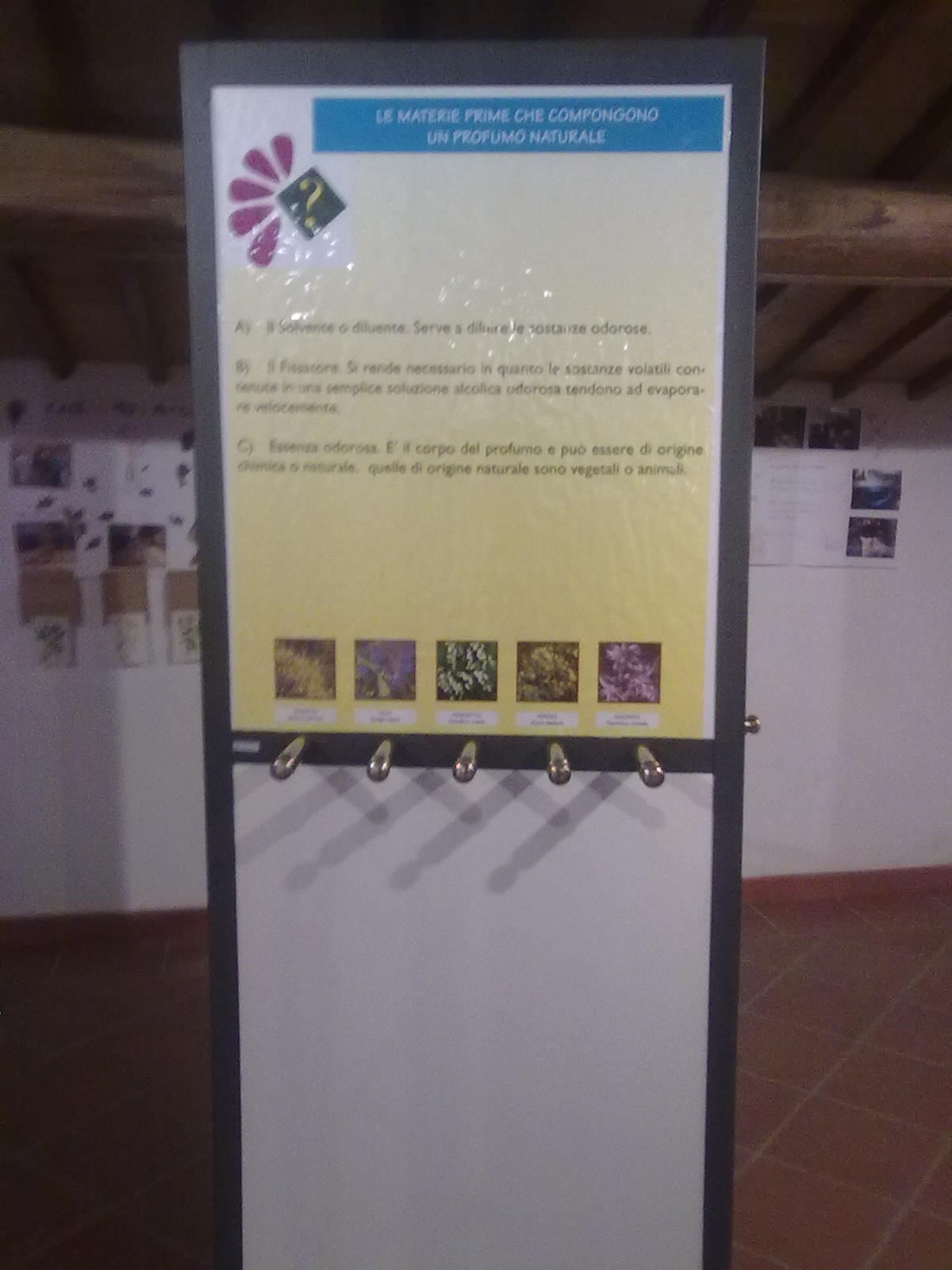

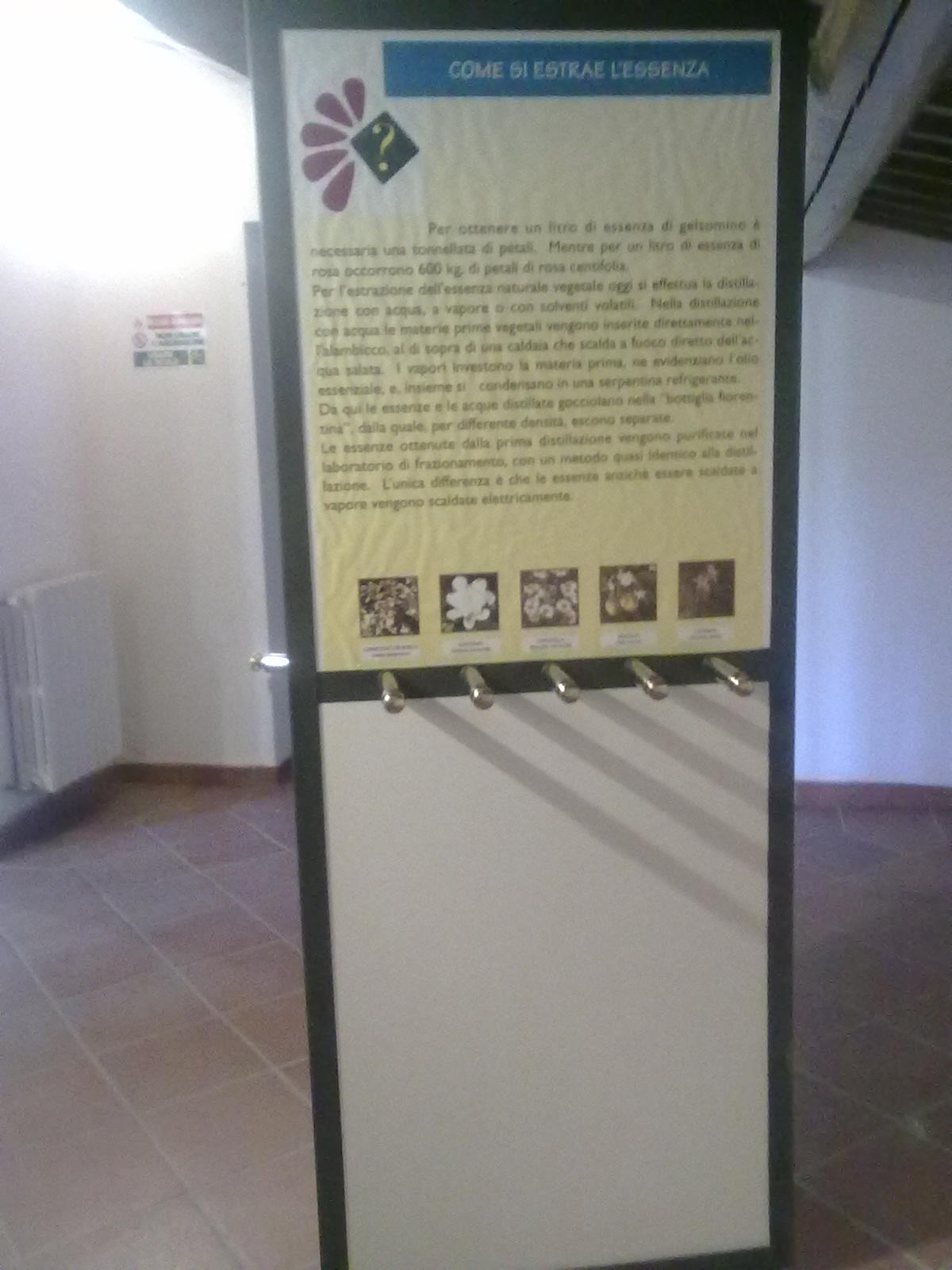
