= Galium baldense =

Scientific classification
- Kingdom: Plantae
- Clade: Tracheophytes
- Clade: Angiosperms
- Clade: Eudicots
- Clade: Asterids
- Order: Gentianales
- Family: Rubiaceae
- Genus: Galium
- Species: G. baldense

Binomial name
- Galium baldense Spreng.

Species of plant

Galium baldense is a plant species in the family Rubiaceae. It is endemic to the mountains of northern Italy, provinces of Lombardia, Trentino-Alto Adige, Veneto, and Friuli-Venezia Giulia.
