= Endangered plants of Europe =

Endangered plants of Europe, the list below contains plants that dwell in or migrate to any region in Europe and any nearby islands of the Atlantic Ocean. This includes plants that are found in the East Atlantic Ocean (Azores), Iceland, the Adriatic Sea, the Sea of Azov, the Black and Caspian Sea, Corsica, Cyprus, Palearctic, Russia, Eurasia, North African Coast, the Mediterranean Sea and islands located in the Mediterranean Sea, and the islands of Spain (Canary, Balearic). As of 2007, twenty-one percent of Europe's vascular plant species (flowering plants, conifers and ferns) are classified as threatened, according to the IUCN. The list below was compiled from data on the IUCN Red List of Endangered Species (IUCN) and "Earth's Endangered Creatures" (Online). The International Union for Conservation of Nature, identifies species in need of attention before approaching extinction and works to increase prevention of extinction. The list below includes vulnerable (VU), endangered (EN), critically endangered (CR), and recently extinct (EX) species.

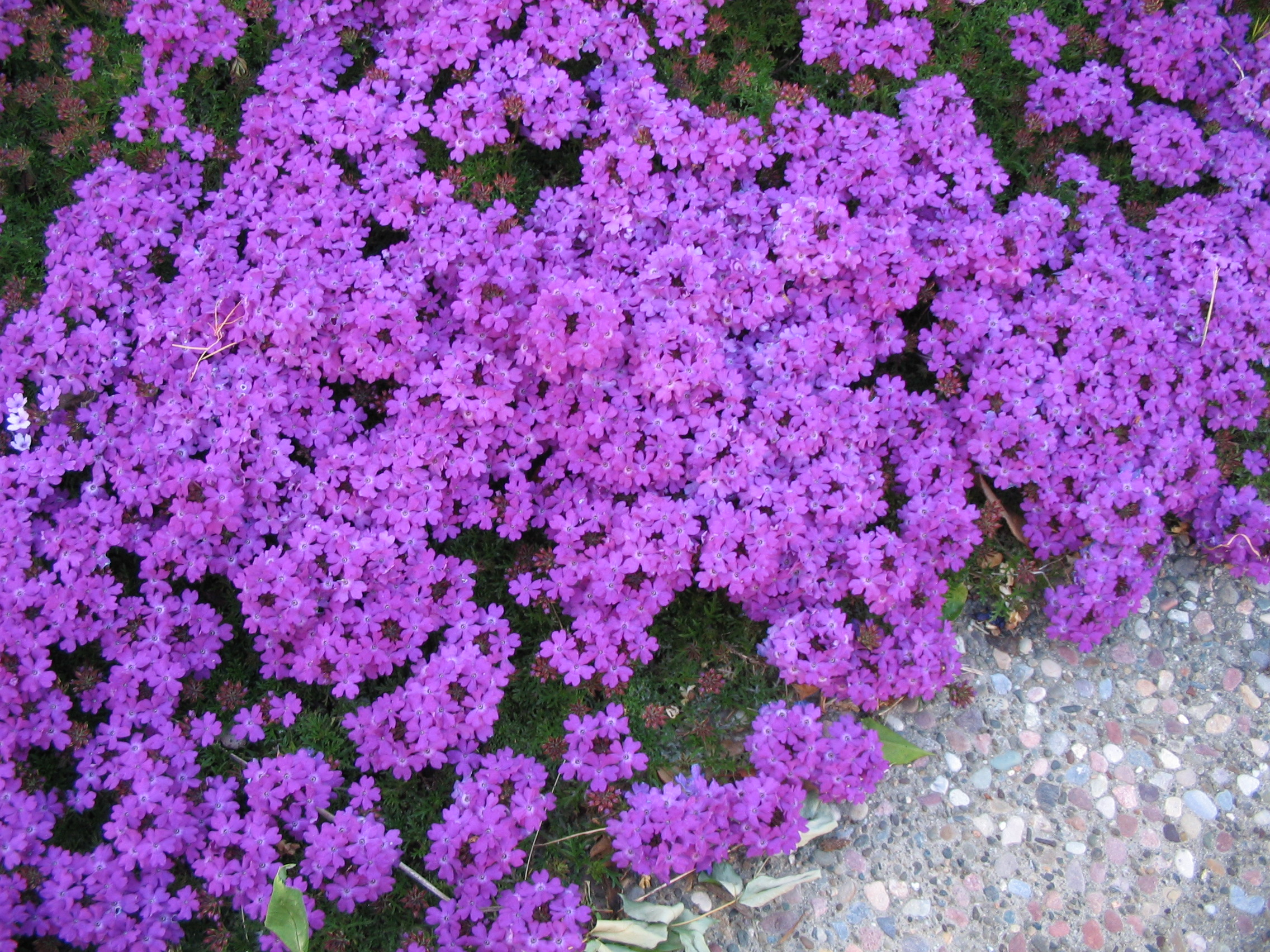
Antirrhinum subbaeticum.

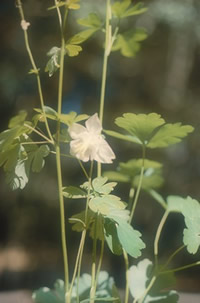
The Barbaricina Colombine or Aquilegia barbaricina.

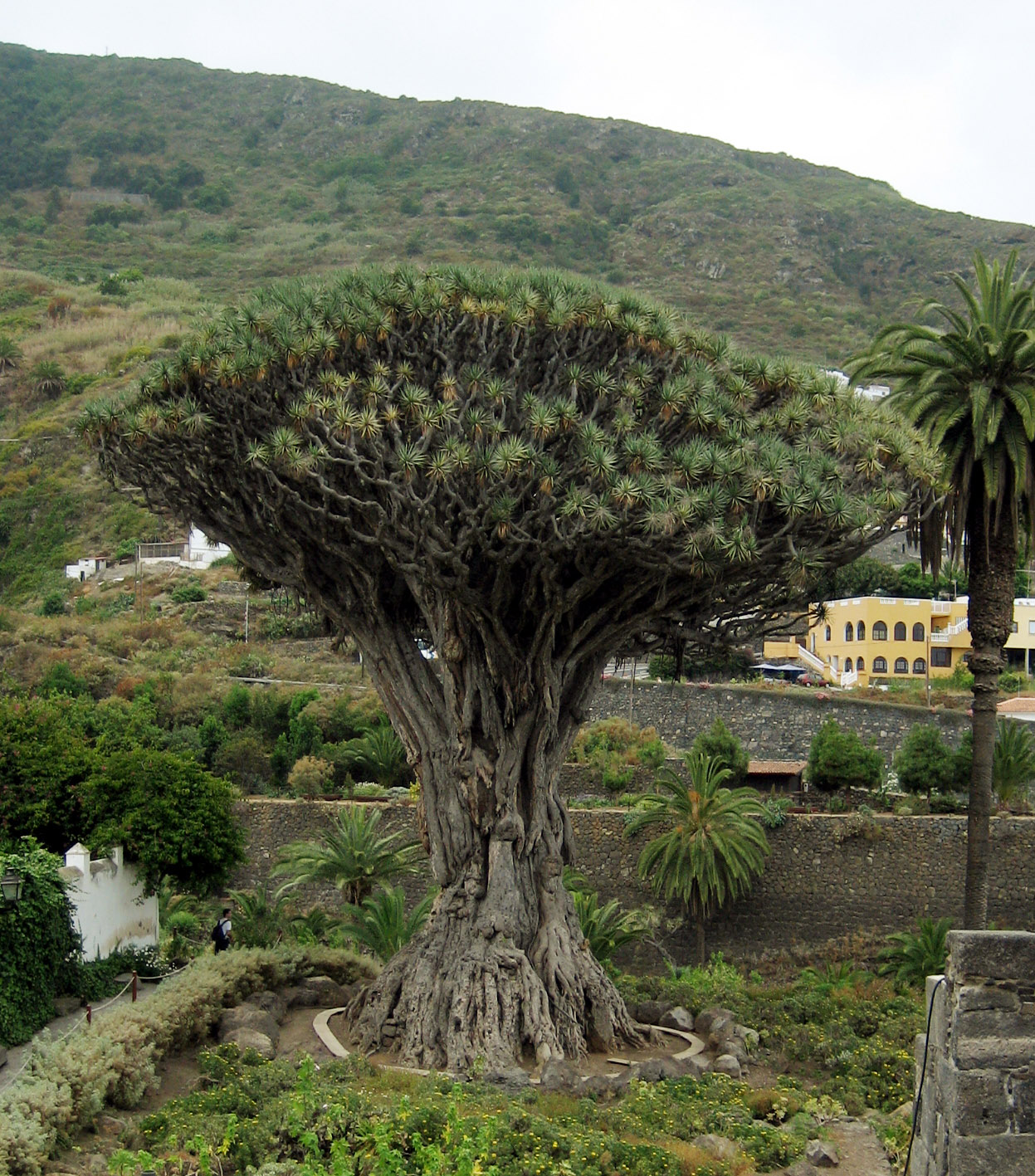
The Dragon Tree or Dracaena.

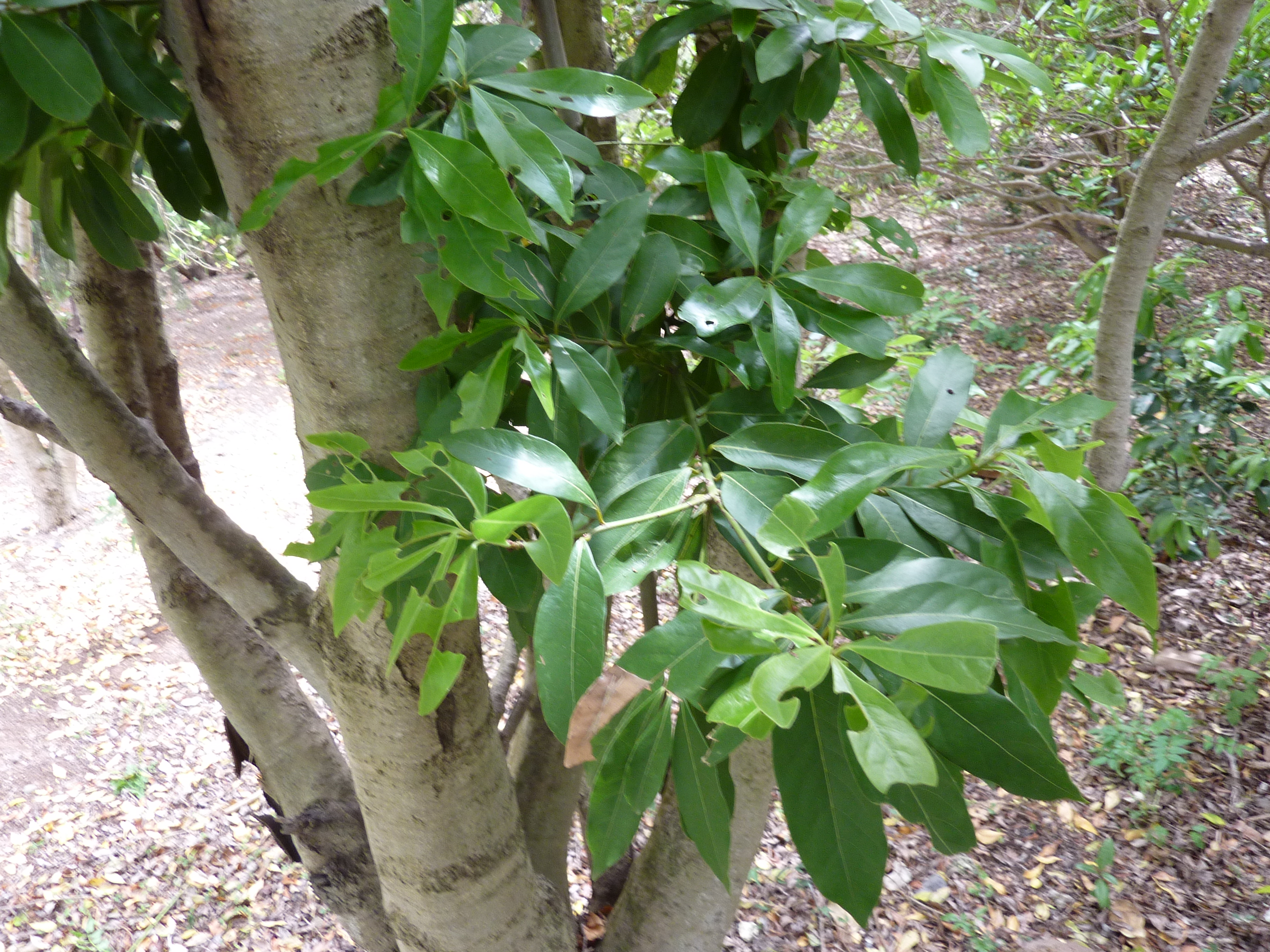
Heberdeniaexcelsa.

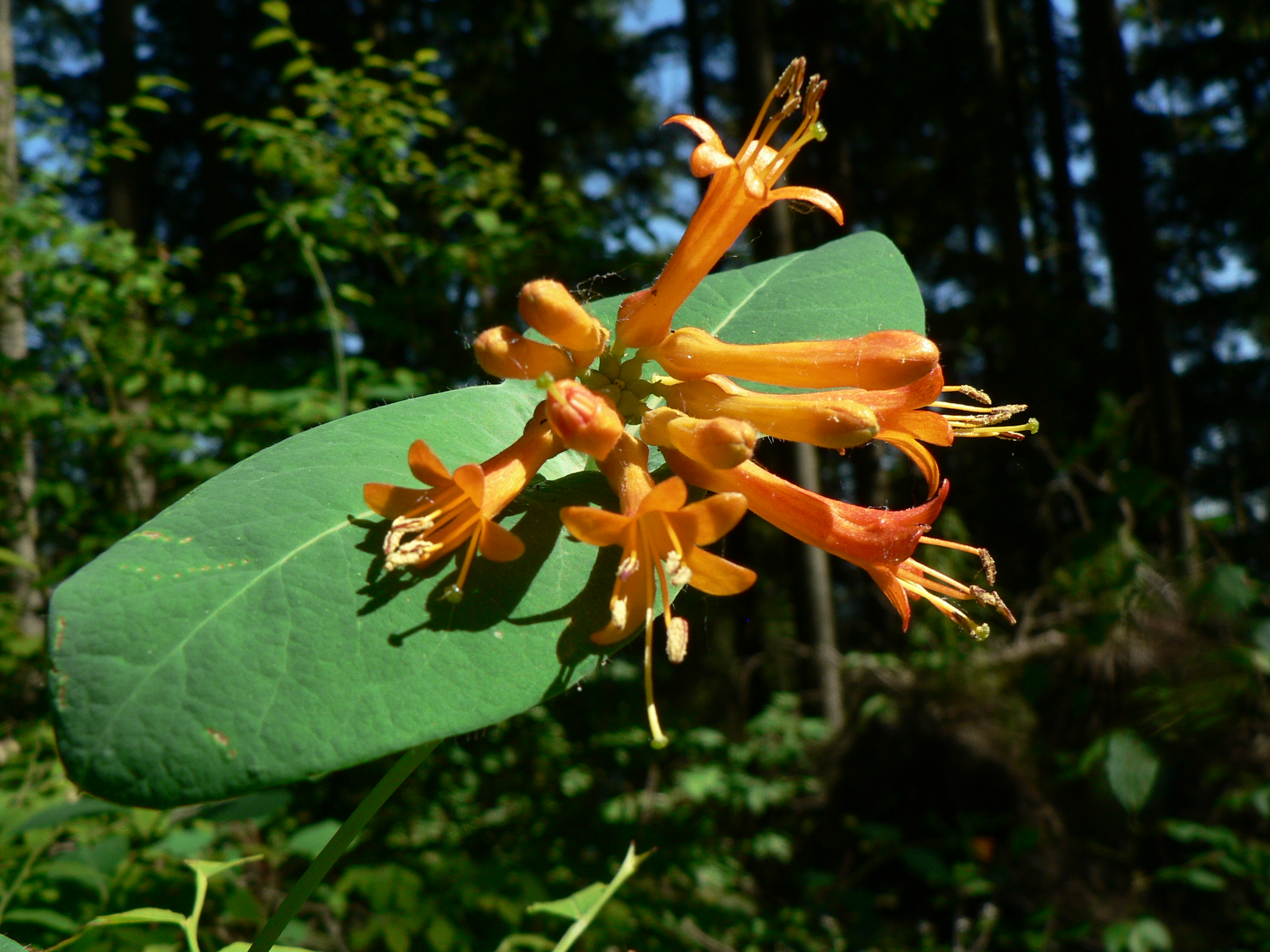
The Lonicera Ciliosa is a species of Honeysuckle.

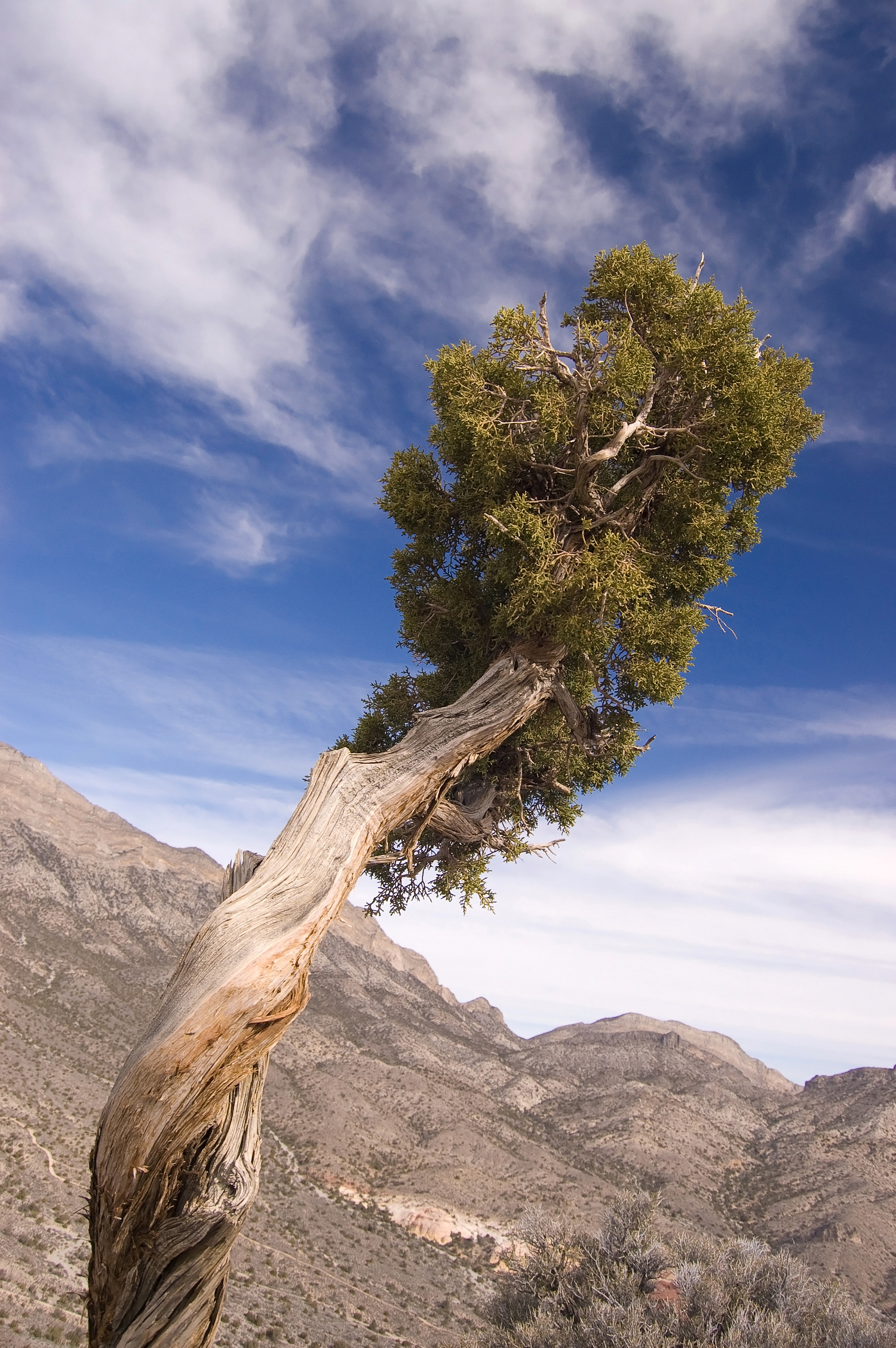
Juniper.

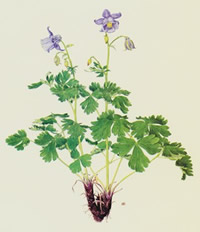
The Nuragica Columbine is threatened in Spain.Aquilegia nuragica.

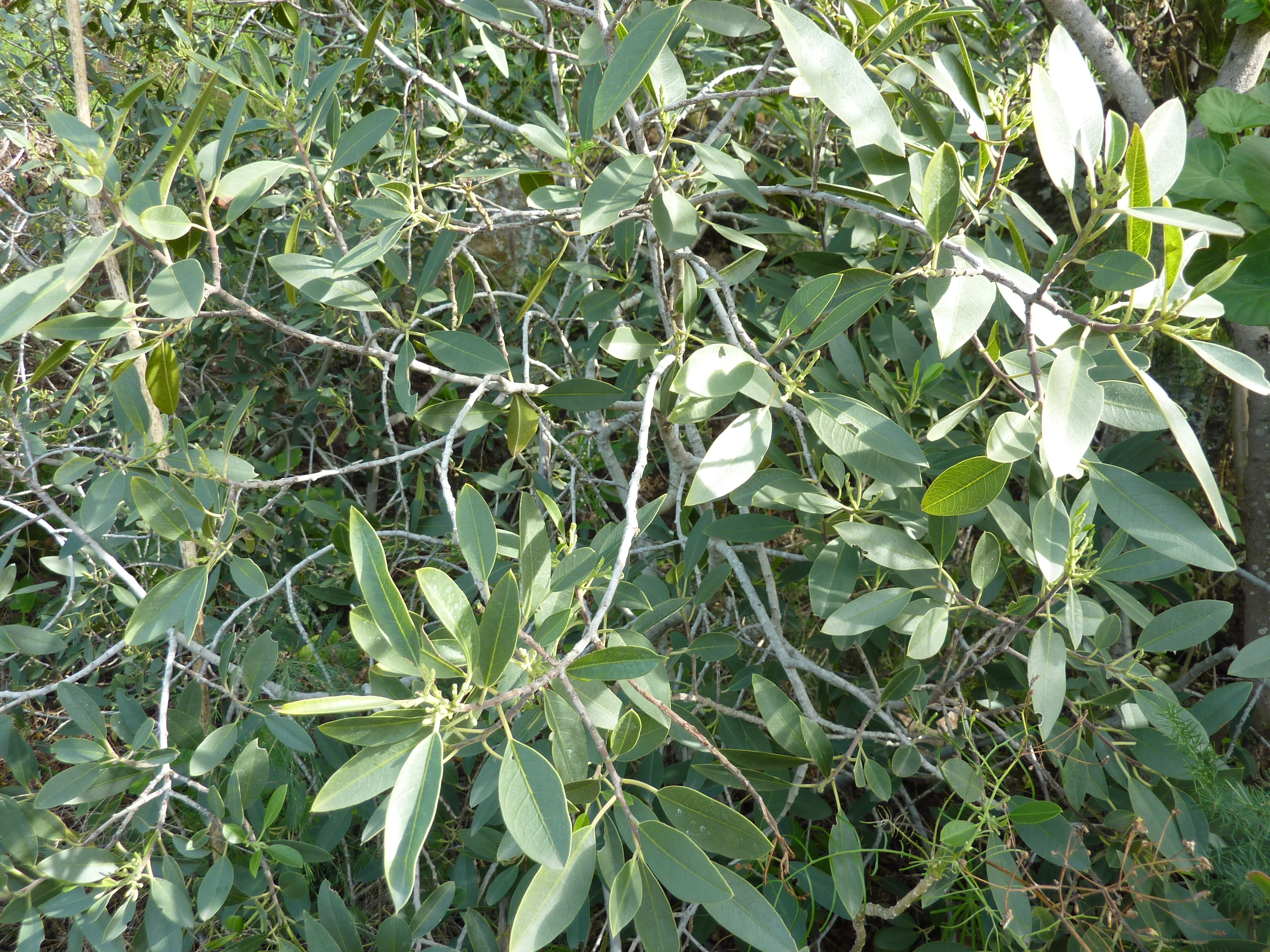
Rhamnus integrifolia.

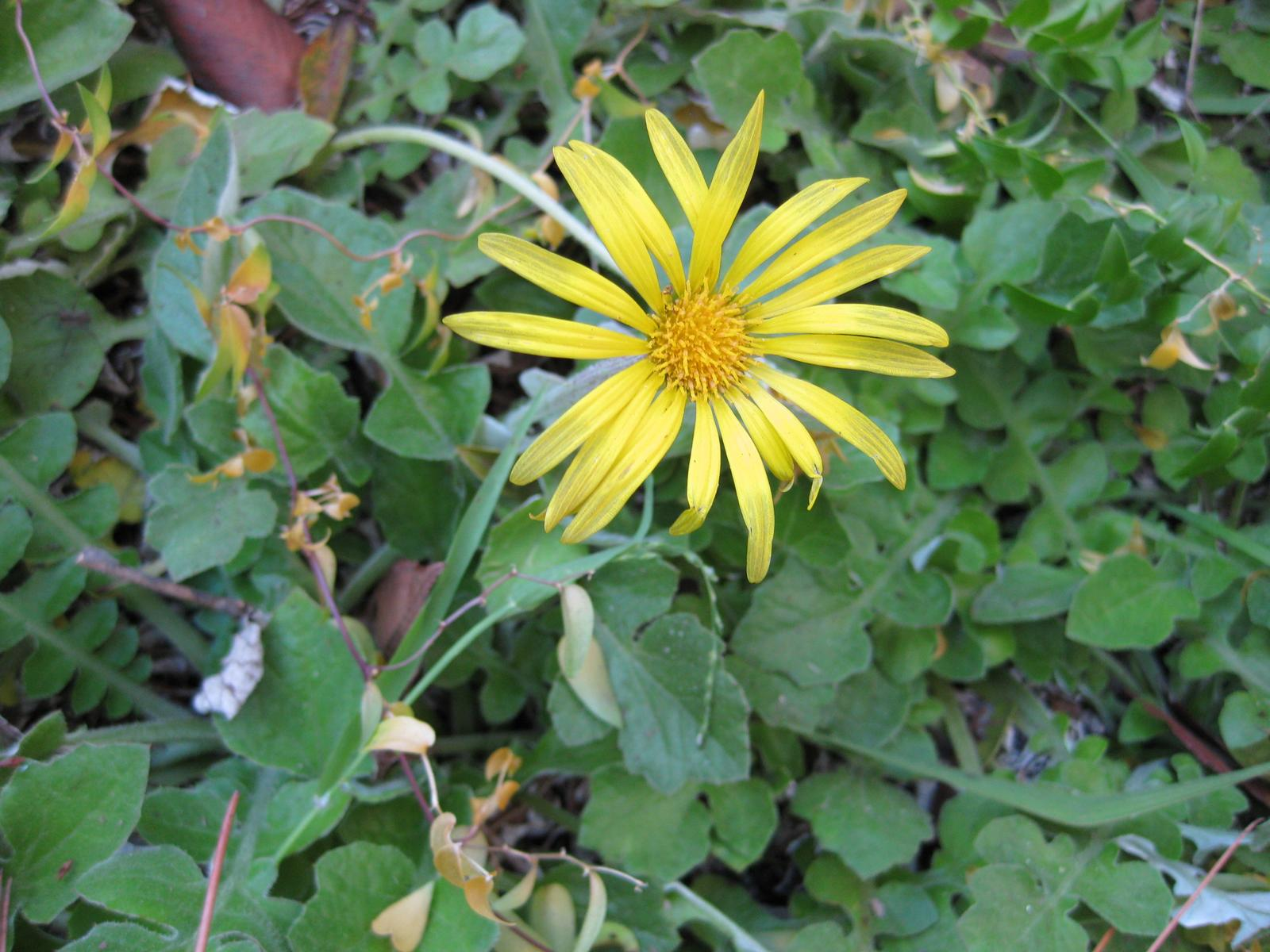
Sea Marigold.

== Threatened plants of Europe and their locations ==
PLANT NAME	STATUS	RANGE/REGION
Akamas Centaury (Centaurea akamantis)	CR	Cyprus
Allium iatrouinum	CR	Greece
Antirrhinum subbaeticum	EN	It originated from Italy but was introduced into Spain
Apid den Bermejo (Apium bermejoi)	CR	Spain
Arran Service-tree (Sorbus pseudofennica)	CR	United Kingdom
Astragalus cavanillesii	CR	Spain
Avon Gorge Whitebeam (Sorbus avonensis)	CR	United Kingdom
Azores Juniper (Juniperus brevifolia)	VU	Portugal (Azores)
Barbaricina Colombine (Aquilegia barbaricina)	CR	Italy
Berberis maderensis	CR	Portugal
Betula celtiberica	???	Spain (possibly Great Britain)
Betula klokovii	CR	Ukraine
Brimeura duvigneaudii	CR	Spain
Bryoxiphium madeirense	EN	Portugal
Buglosse Crépu (Anchusa crispa)	CR	France, Italy
Bully Tree (Sideroxylon marginatum)	CR	Cape Verde, Portugal, Spain
Bupleuro delle (Bupleurum elatum)	CR	Madoni Italy
Bupleuro di Marettimo (Bupleurum dianthifolium)	CR	Italy
Calligonum triste	CR	Kazakhstan
Canary Islands Juniper (Juniperus cedrus)	CR	Portugal (Madeira); Spain (Canary Is.)
Canary Strawberry Tree (Arbutus canariensis)	???	Spain (Canary Islands)
Canutillo del Teide (Silene nocteolens)	CR	Spain (Canary Is.)
Cardón de Jandía (Euphorbia handiensis)	VU	Spain (Canary Is.)
Carum foetidum	???	Algeria, Spain
Casey's Larkspur (Delphinium caseyi)	CR	Cyprus
Centranthus amazonum	CR	Italy (Sardegna)
Centaurea borjae	EN	Spain
Centranthus trinervis	EN	France
Cerastium sventenii	EN	Spain (Canary Islands)
Cheddar Whitebeam (Sorbus cheddarensis)	CR	United Kingdom
Cineraria (Senecio elodes)	EN	Spain
Conservilla Majorera (Salvia herbanica)	CR	Spain (Canary Is.)
Cornish Path Moss (Ditrichum cornubicum)	CR	United Kingdom
Cretan Zelkova (Zelkova abelicea)	EN	Greece
Crimean Rowan (Sorbus tauricola)	CR	Ukraine
Cyprus Cedar (Cedrus brevifolia)	VU	Cyprus
Derbyshire Feather-moss (Thamnobryum angustifolium)	CR	United Kingdom
Distichophyllum carinatum	CR	Austria, Germany and Switzerland
Dracaena draco (Canary Islands dragon tree)	EN	Portugal (Madeira), Spain (Canary Islands)
Echinodium setigerum	EN	Portugal (Madeira)
Echinodium spinosum	EN	Portugal (Madeira) and Spain (Canary Is.)
Echium acanthocarpum	CR	Spain (Canary Islands)
Echium callithyrsum	VU	Spain (Canary Is.)
Echium gentianoides	VU	Spain (Canary Is.)
Echium handiense	CR	Spain (Canary Is.)
Echium portosanctense	CR	Portugal
Erysimum kykkoticum	CR	Cyprus
Evans's Whitebeam (Sorbus evansii)	CR	United Kingdom
Falsa Sanicola (Petagnaea gussonei)	EN	Italy
Flueggea anatolica	EN	Turkey
Gradsteinia torrenticola	VU	Spain
Gyrocaryum oppositifolium	VU	Spain
Harz' Mehlbeere (Sorbus harziana)	CR	Germany
Heberdenia excelsa	VU	Portugal (Madeira), Spain (Canary Islands)
Helianthemum guerrae	EN	Spain
Maltese Everlasting (Helichrysum melitense)	CR	Malta
Medicago citrina	CR	Spain
Hieracium lucidum	CR	Italy
Horstrissea dolinicola	CR	Greece
Jaramago de Alboran (Diplotaxis siettiana)	CR	Spain
Jasione mansanetiana	EN	Spain
Kythrean Sage (Salvia veneris)	CR	Cyprus
Lamyropsis microcephala	CR	Italy
Larkspur (Delphinium iris)	CR	Turkey
Ligusticum huteri	CR	Spain
Limonium strictissimum	EN	France, Italy
Lithodora nitida	EN	Spain
Llangollen Whitebeam (Sorbus cuneifolia)	EN	United Kingdom
Llanthony Whitebeam (Sorbus stenophylla)	EN	United Kingdom
Lonicera karataviensis	CR	Kazakhstan
Lunetiere de Rotges (Biscutella rotgesii)	CR	France
Lysimachia minoricensis	EW (Extinct in the Wild)	Spain
Maltase Cliff-orache	EN	Malta
Maltese Centaury (Cheirolophus crassifolius)	CR	Malta
Malus niedzwetzkyana	EN	Afghanistan, China, Kazakhstan, Kyrgyzstan, Tajikistan, Uzbekistan
Manzanilla de Sierra Nevada (Artemisia granatensis)	EN	Spain
Maura Scannell's Whitebeam (Sorbus scannelliana)	CR	Ireland
Meierotts Mehlbeere (Sorbus meierottii)	CR	Germany
Megrelian Birch (Betula megrelica)	CR	Georgia
Minuartia dirphya	CR	Greece
Moehringia fontqueri	EN	Spain
Morris Squill (Scilla morrisii)	EN	Cyprus
Myrica rivas-martinezii	CR	Spain (Canary Islands)
Narcissus gaditanus	???	Portugal, Spain
Narcissus lusitanicus	VU	Portugal, Spain
Narcissus nevadensis	EN	Spain
Narcissus willkommii	EN	Portugal
Naufraga balearica	CR	Spain
Nees’ Hornwort (Anthoceros neesii)	CR	Austria, Czech Republic, Germany, Poland
No Parking Tree (Sorbus admonitor)	EN	United Kingdom
Nuragica Columbine (Aquilegia nuragica)	CR	Italy
Ochyraea tatrensis	CR	Slovakia
Orthotrichum handiense	CR	Spain (Canary Is.)
Pleiomeris canariensis	CR	Spain (Canary Islands)
Polygala helenae	CR	Greece (East Aegean Is.)
Polygala sinisica	CR	Italy
Pyrus anatolica	???	Turkey
Radula jonesii	EN	Portugal, Spain (Canary Islands)
Rhamnus integrifolia	???	Spain (Canary Islands)
Riccia atlantica	CR	Portugal (Madeira)
Salviablanca de Doramas (Sideritis discolor)	CR	Spain (Canary Is.)
Salix canariensis	???	Portugal (Madeira); Spain (Canary Is.)
Salix xanthicola	VU	Bulgaria, Greece
Saponaria jagelii	CR	Greece
Sardinian Currant (Ribes sardoum)	CR	Italy
Scapania sphaerifera	CR	Russia
Schuwerk Mehlbeere (Sorbus schuwerkiorum)	CR	Germany
Sea Marigold (Calendula maritima)	CR	Italy
Serbian Spruce (Picea omorika)	EN	Bosnia and Herzegovina
Ship Rock Whitebeam (Sorbus parviloba)	CR	United Kingdom
Shrubby Buckwheat (Atraphaxis muschketowi)	EN	Kazakhstan, Kyrgyzstan
Sibiraea tianschanica	CR	Kazakhstan, Kyrgyzstan
Sicilian Fir (Abies nebrodensis)	CR	Italy
Silene de Ifac (Silene hifacensis)	EN	Spain and Baleares
Silene marizii	???	Portugal, Spain
Silene orphanidis	EN	Greece
Solenanthus reverchonii	CR	Spain
Sorbus barrandienica	CR	Czechia
Sorbus busambarensis	CR	Italy
Sorbus cucullifera	CR	Austria, Czechia
Sorbus thayensis	CR	Austria, Czechia
Sorbus milensis	CR	Czechia
Sorbus moravica	CR	Czechia
Sorbus pauca	CR	Czechia
Sorbus portae-bohemicae	CR	Czechia
Sorbus spectans	CR	United Kingdom
Sorbus tobani	CR	Hungary
Sorbus rhodanthera	CR	Czechia
Spiraeanthus schrenkianus	EN	Kazakhstan, Kyrgyzstan
Star Thistle (Centaurea corensis)	CR	Italy
Stonecress (Aethionema retsina)	CR	Greece
Succisella andreae-molinae	EN	Spain
Teucrium balthazaris	???	Spain
Thin-Leaved Whitebeam (Sorbus leptophylla)	EN	United Kingdom
Troodos Rockcress (Arabis kennedyae)	CR	Cyprus
Twin Cliffs Whitebeam (Sorbus eminentoides)	CR	United Kingdom
Urartuan Milkwort (Polygala urartu)	EN	Armenia
White's Whitebeam (Sorbus whiteana)	CR	United Kingdom
Würzburger Mehlbeere (Sorbus herbipolitana)	CR	Germany
Yesquera Roja (Helichrysum monogynum)	EN	Spain (Canary Is.)
Yesquera Amarilla (Helichrysum gossypinum)	VU	Spain (Canary Is.)
Yorkshire Feather-moss (Thamnobryum cataractarum)	CR	United Kingdom
Zelkova sicula	CR	Italy

== Conservation ==
Propragation has been conducted using in-vitro techniques in facilities across the country. This method of conservation is used in parts of the world to preserve plants for as long as possible. In-vitro propagation has allowed material to be kept in in-vitro gene banks, and this will expand with deeper developments in cryopreservation technology.

An increasing number of botanic gardens now have in-vitro facilities, and information on techniques is distributed between these in addition to cultures.

== See also ==
- Threatened mammals of Europe
