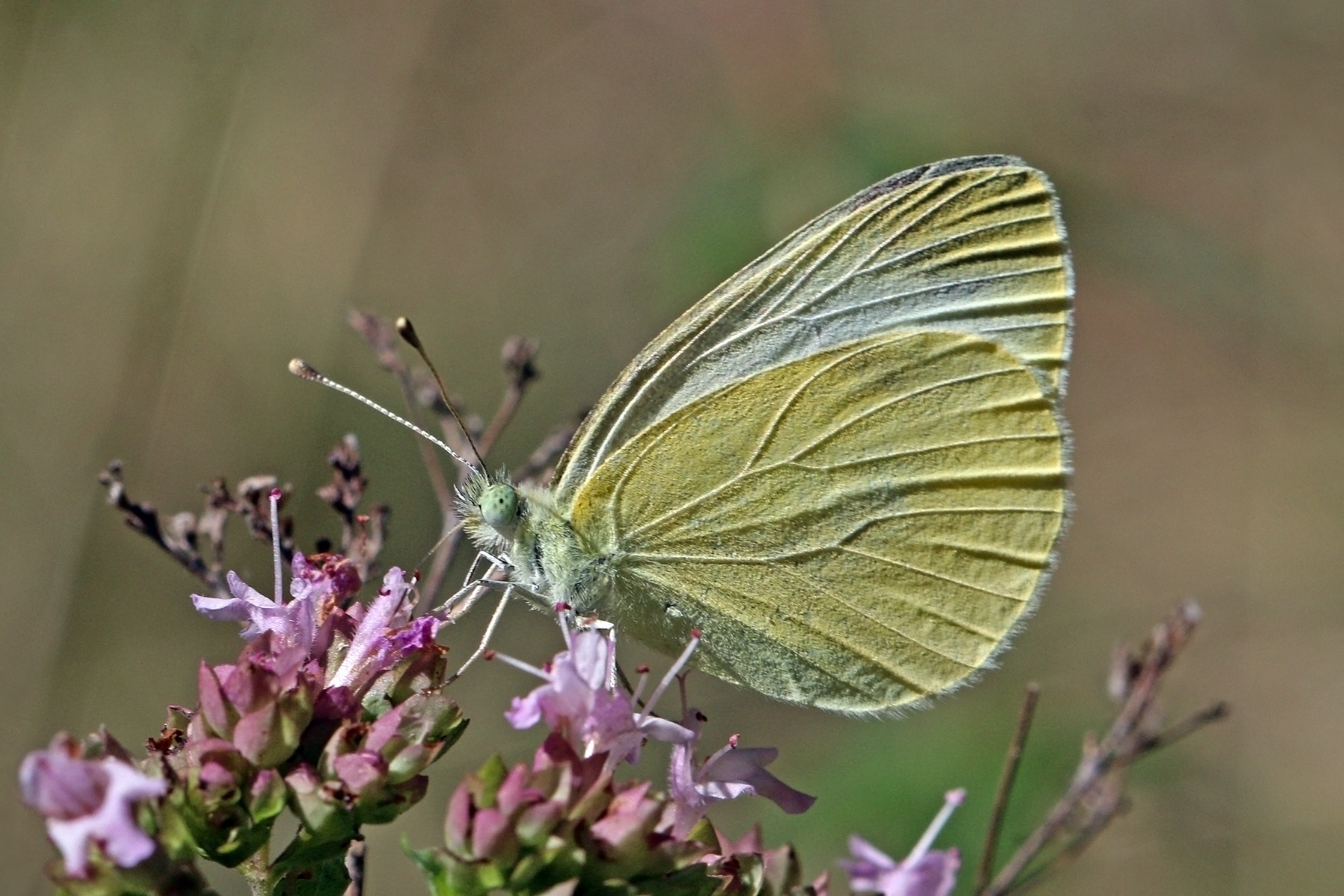
- In Bulgaria

Scientific classification
- Kingdom: Animalia
- Phylum: Arthropoda
- Clade: Pancrustacea
- Class: Insecta
- Order: Lepidoptera
- Family: Pieridae
- Genus: Pieris
- Species: P. ergane

Binomial name
- Pieris ergane (Geyer, [1828])

= Pieris ergane =

Mountain small white

Species of butterfly

Pieris ergane, the mountain small white, is a butterfly of the family Pieridae. It is found in Southern Europe, Asia Minor, Syria, Iraq, Iran and Transcaucasia.

== Description in Seitz ==
[The length of the forewings is 19–24 mm.] P. ergane Hhn. (= narcaea Frr) (20 d), from South-East Europe and Asia Minor, is beneath devoid of black markings in male and female. The seasonal forms appear to differ only slightly; however, we have not been able to ascertain anything certain on that point. — longomaculata Rostagno is yellowish white above, the black spots of forewing are deeper in colour, larger, prolonged, the forewing beneath is straw- colour, with chrome -yellow apical spot, the hindwing beneath being also chrome -yellow. — In female ab. magnimaculata Rostagno the black spots are still more developed than in longomaculata, while in male ab. semimaculata Rostagno the upperside of forewing, except the dark apical spot, is entirely white. These 3 forms have been observed in Central Italy. — Larva dull blue-green, head bluish green, the whole body dotted with numerous small black white-hairy warts, mouth-parts pale brown, the stigma-line represented on each segment only by a yellow spot, in which is situated the dark-brown-edged light brown stigma, thoracical legs coloured like the body, claws light brown, prolegs with light brown soles (Spuler).

== Biology ==
Adults are on wing from April to September in two to three generations

The larvae feed on Aethionema saxatile and Aethionema orbiculatum.
