= Harpalus modestus =

Scientific classification
- Kingdom: Animalia
- Phylum: Arthropoda
- Clade: Pancrustacea
- Class: Insecta
- Order: Coleoptera
- Suborder: Adephaga
- Family: Carabidae
- Genus: Harpalus
- Species: H. modestus

Binomial name
- Harpalus modestus Dejean, 1829

Synonyms
- Harpalus flavitarsis Dejean, 1829

Species of beetle

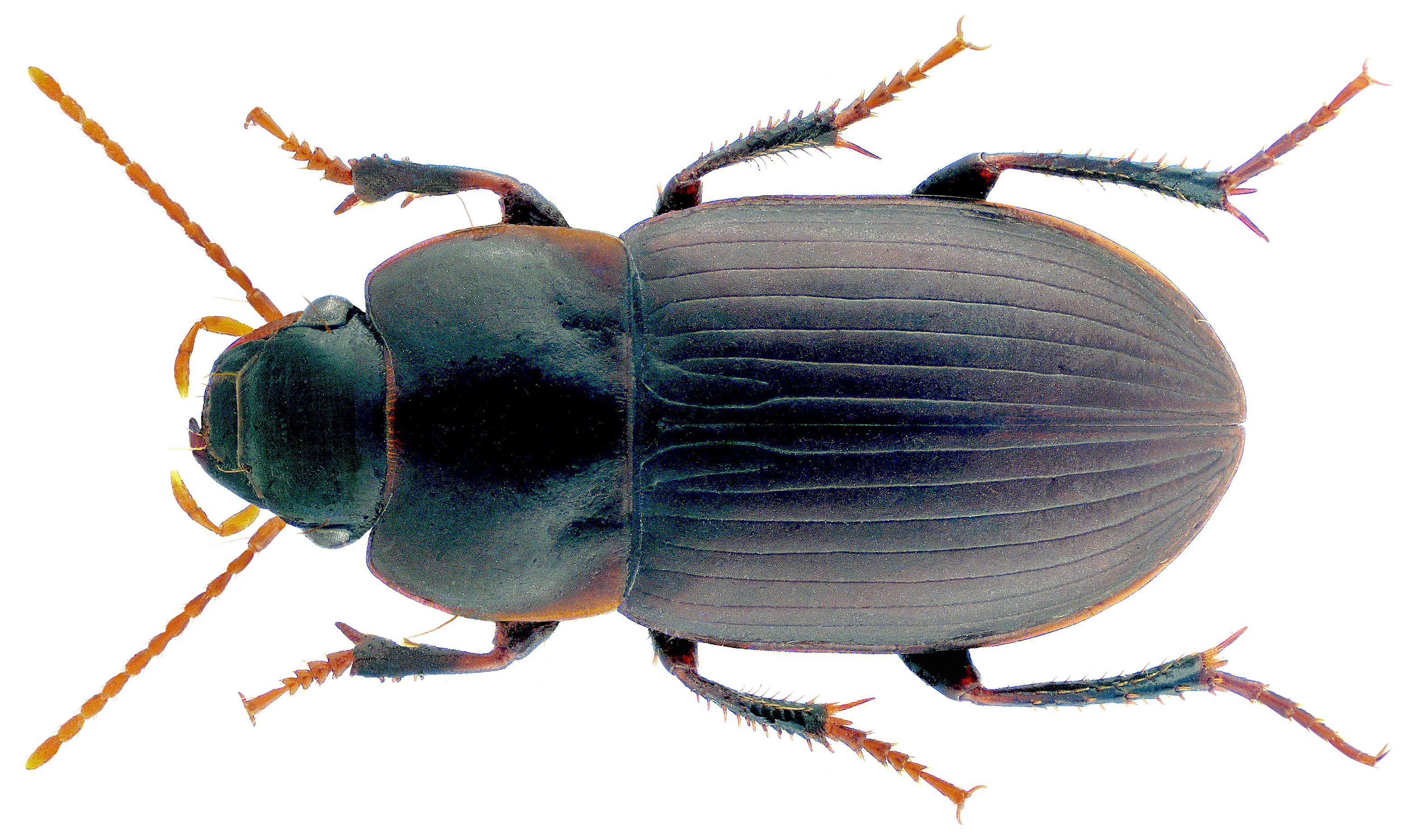
Harpalus modestus

Harpalus modestus is a species of black coloured ground beetle that can be found in such European countries as Andorra, Austria, Baltic states, Benelux, Bulgaria, Czech Republic, France, Germany, Hungary, Italy, Moldova, Poland, Slovakia, Switzerland, Ukraine, all states of former Yugoslavia (except for North Macedonia), and central part of Russia. Its existence in Spain and on Alboran island is doubtful. It can also be found in Japan, North and South Korea, and Chinese provinces such as Heilongjiang, Liaoning, Qinghai, Shanxi, and Sichuan.
