= Alvania alboranensis =

Scientific classification
- Kingdom: Animalia
- Phylum: Mollusca
- Class: Gastropoda
- Subclass: Caenogastropoda
- Order: Littorinimorpha
- Family: Rissoidae
- Genus: Alvania
- Species: A. alboranensis

Binomial name
- Alvania alboranensis Peñas & Rolán, 2006

Species of gastropod

Alvania alboranensis is a species of minute sea snail, a marine gastropod mollusc or micromollusc in the family Rissoidae.

== Description ==
The length of the shell attains 3.7 mm. Shell turriculate, spire steeply conical, profile maybe slightly concave, approximately five sharply keeled whorls and aperture oval to polygonal.

== Distribution ==
The marine organism is found in Alborán Island, Spain
