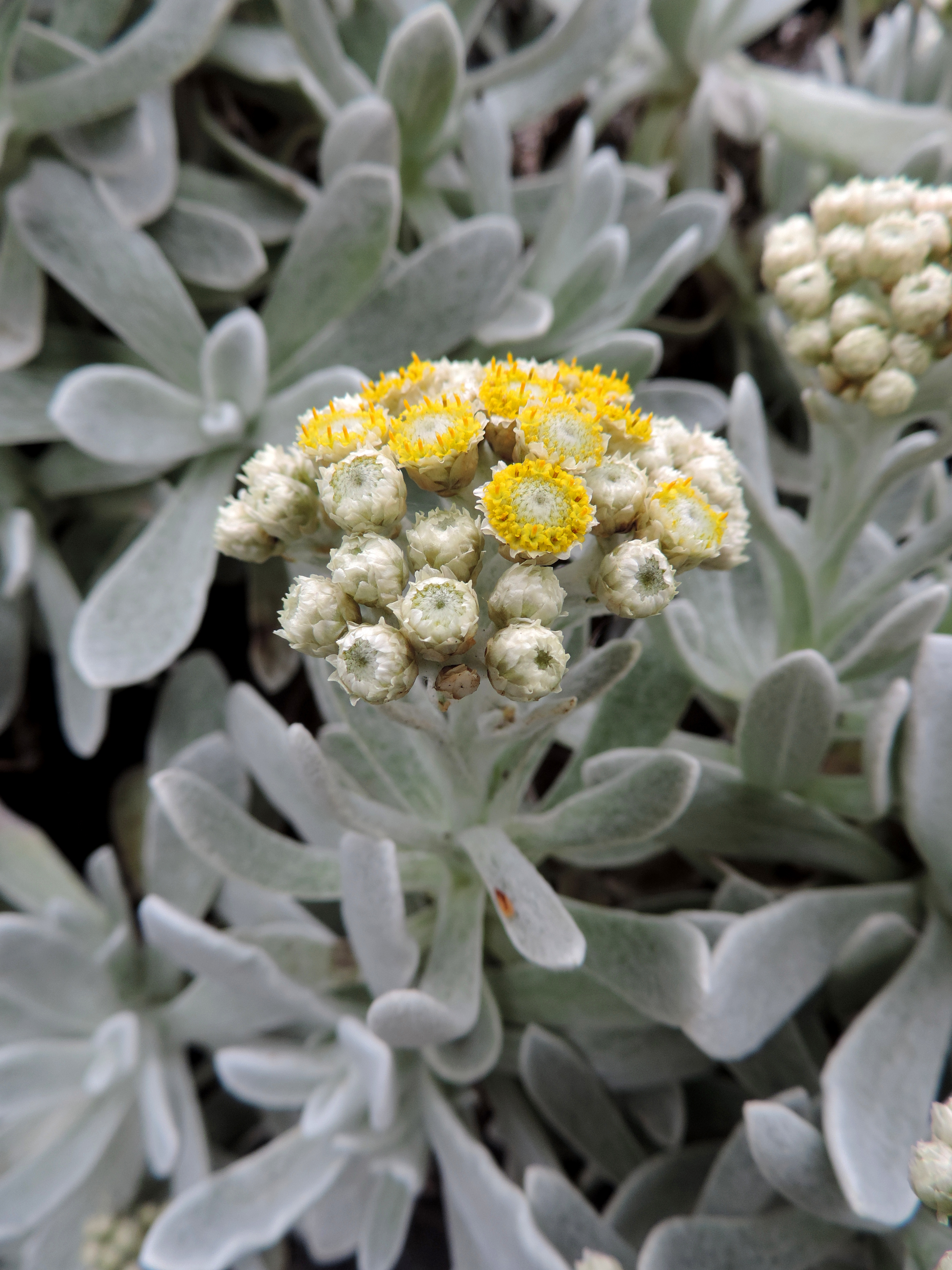

Conservation status
- Vulnerable (IUCN 3.1)

Scientific classification
- Kingdom: Plantae
- Clade: Embryophytes
- Clade: Tracheophytes
- Clade: Angiosperms
- Clade: Eudicots
- Clade: Asterids
- Order: Asterales
- Family: Asteraceae
- Genus: Helichrysum
- Species: H. gossypinum

Binomial name
- Helichrysum gossypinum Sch. Bip. (1845)
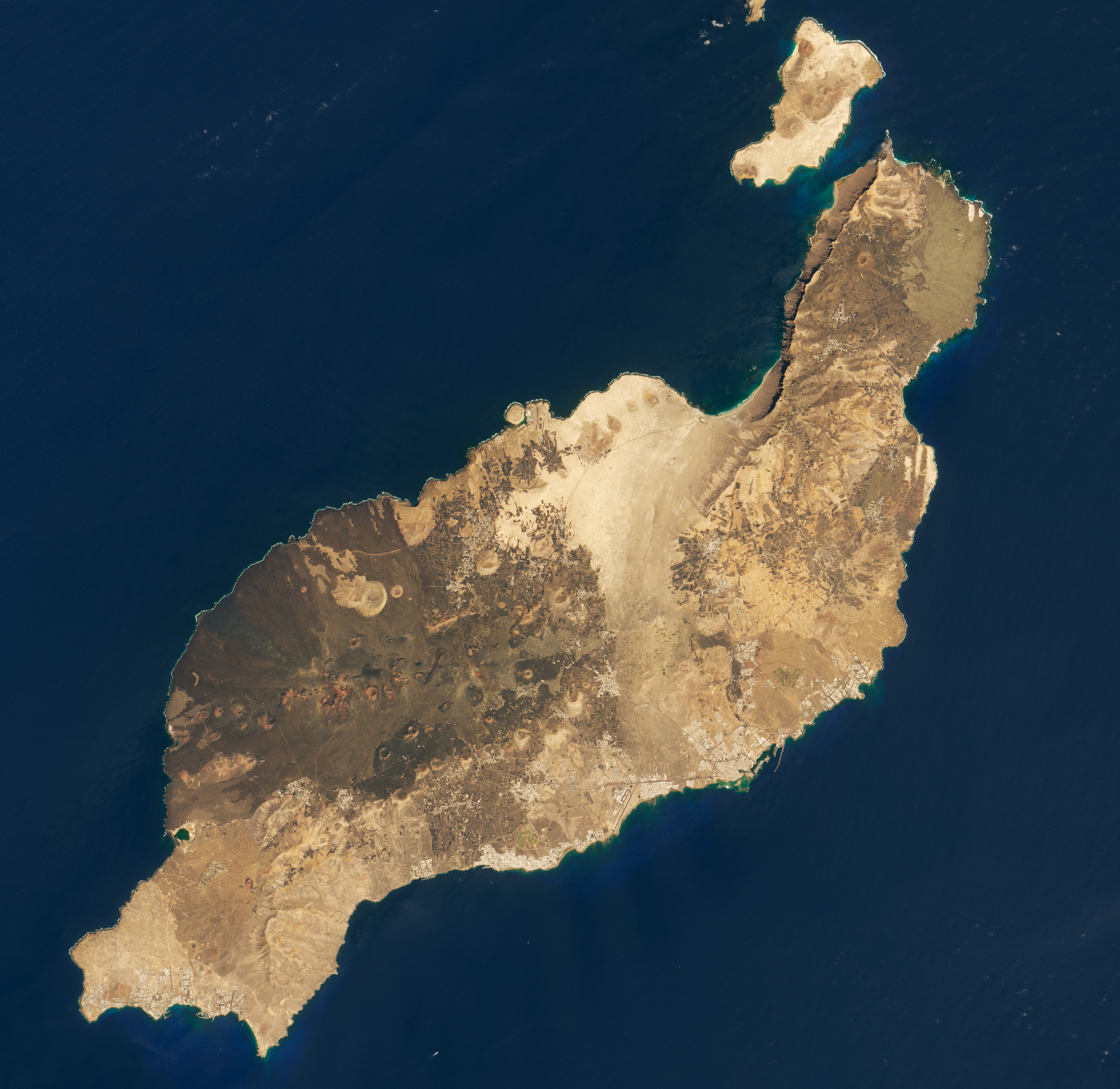
- H. gossypinum is endemic to Lanzarote, Canary Islands.

Synonyms
- List: Gnaphalium webbii Sch.Bip.; Helichrysum webbii (Sch.Bip.) Christ

= Helichrysum gossypinum =

Species of flowering plant

Helichrysum gossypinum, also known as cotton wool everlasting or yellow tinderbox, is a species of flowering plant within the genus Helichrysum and family Asteraceae. The species is endemic to the island of Lanzarote of the Canary Islands. Due to being an endemic species it can be found nowhere else in the world. The plant is characterized by its large vibrant yellow flowers and its ability to thrive in rocky habitats.

== Description ==
Helichrysum gossypinum is a basal flowering plant with a shrubby growth habit, which lacks rosettes and overwintering buds. The inflorescence of Helichrysum gossypinum consists of heterogamous capitula, meaning that the gender ratio within each capitulum is not uniform. Each capitulum is composed of numerous florets, which are the individual flowers within the inflorescence. The inflorescence are large and yellow in colour, reaching a size of 6–8 mm in diameter. H. gossypinum is a diploid plant with 2n = 28 chromosomes.

== Distribution ==
Helichrysum gossypinum is endemic to Lanzarote, one of several Canary Islands located within the Atlantic Ocean off the Northwestern coast of Africa. The species on the island is distributed across six subpopulations located in: El Jurado, Riscos de Famara, Barranco del Cuchillo, Barranco de Chafarís, Ladera de Tenegüime, and Malpaís del Sobaco. The entire population of the species is spread between these six known subpopulations, with the overall population estimated at just over 7000 individuals. H. gossypinum has a restricted range, inhabiting an area of occupancy measuring approximately 13.5 square kilometers (5.2 sq mi).

== Habitat ==
The habitat of Helichrysum gossypinum primarily consists of rocky areas such as inland cliffs, mountain peaks, ridges, and the slopes of ravines. The habitat of H. gossypinum is geologically unstable and prone to landslides. Lanzarote consists of volcanic rock types and moderately alkaline soils. H. gossypinum thrives in rupicolous communities, often coexisting with plant species such as Aeonium lancerottense and Reichardia famarae.

Lanzarote is an island known for its mild and stable climate, with minimal variations in temperatures between summer and winter. The annual average temperature on the island is 20.7 °C (69.26 °F). Over a 28-year period, the average rainfall has been estimated at 110 meters squared, although particularly dry years can result in a decrease of up to 25% in the amount of rainwater. The majority of rainfall occurs between the months of November, December, and January, accounting for 57% of the annual precipitation. Humidity levels on the island fluctuate throughout the day and night, influenced by air temperature. During the day, increased sunshine leads to higher humidity levels that do not reach saturation. However, during the night, as the air cools down, humidity reaches saturation and condenses into liquid water when it comes into contact with cold surfaces. This phenomenon contributes a significant amount of water to the ecosystem and provides H. gossypinum with water as a result.

== Threats ==
The species faces several threats that endanger its survival. Threats such as predation on seedlings by livestock poses a significant risk to the population. Additionally, landslides, which are common in the geologically unstable habitat and can cause further damage to plants and their surroundings. The island of Lanzarote is also home to the closely related, equally endemic and critically endangered species H. monogynum, which is capable of hybridization with H. gossypinum, harming the genetic integrity of both species. Anthropogenic factors also contribute to the plants vulnerability, with both road construction and road works having been reported to negatively effect the species.

== Conservation ==
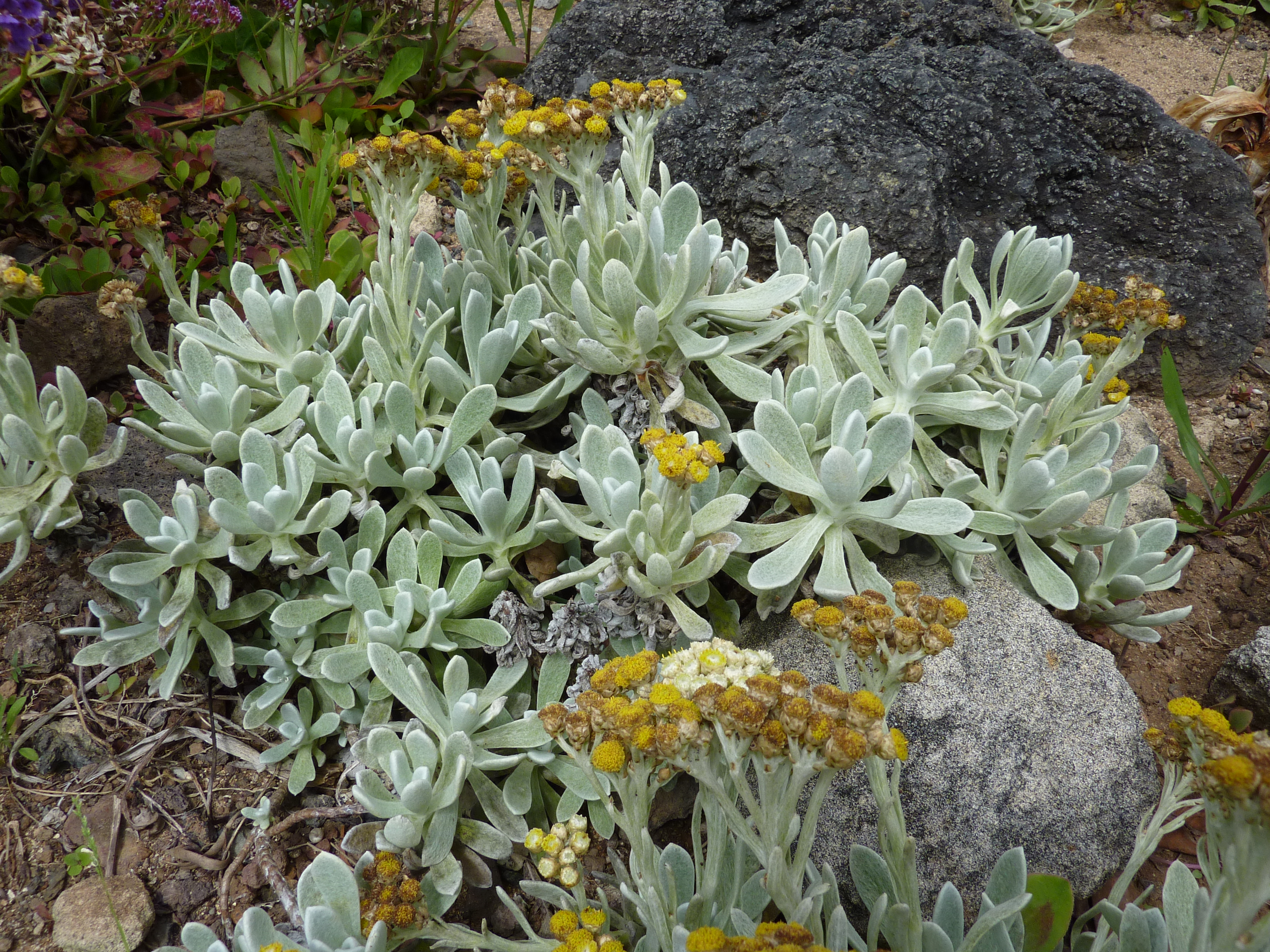
Helichrysum gossypinum growing in Jardín Botánico Canario Viera y Clavijo

Efforts to conserve Helichrysum gossypinum focus on the protection of its subpopulations. Subpopulations of H. gossypinum are located within protected areas, such as: Paisaje Protegido de La Geria, Paisaje Protegido Barranco de Tenegüime, and Parque Natural Archipiélago Chinijo. These protected areas help safeguard the species and its habitat from further harm and provide a sanctuary for its survival.

In addition, the botanical garden Jardín Botánico Canario Viera y Clavijo possesses a seed bank. Seeds of Helichrysum gossypinum were collected and are being stored within their repository, which serves as a valuable resource in preserving the genetic diversity of the species.

Helichrysum gossypinum also holds significant recognition in international legislation. It has been designated as an important species and is included in Annex II of the Habitats Directive. Furthermore, it is listed under Appendix I of the Convention on the Conservation of European Wildlife and Natural Habitats (Bern Convention). In Spain, it is regarded as a species with "Protección Especial" and is featured in the national list of species under special protection. Additionally, it has been categorized as VU D2 in the Spanish Red List.
