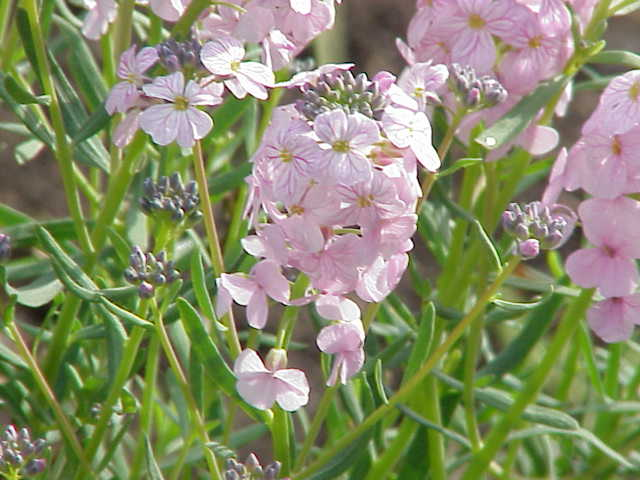
- Aethionema grandiflorum

Scientific classification
- Kingdom: Plantae
- Clade: Tracheophytes
- Clade: Angiosperms
- Clade: Eudicots
- Clade: Rosids
- Order: Brassicales
- Family: Brassicaceae
- Subfamily: Aethionemoideae; D.A.German, Hendriks, M.Koch, F.Lens, Lysak, C.D.Bailey, Mumm. & Al-Shehbaz
- Genus: Aethionema; R.Br.

Synonyms
- Acanthocardamum Thell.; Campyloptera Boiss.; Crenularia Boiss.; Diastrophis Fisch. & C.A.Mey.; Disynoma Raf.; Eunomia DC.; Iondra Raf.; Lipophragma Schott & Kotschy ex Boiss.

= Aethionema =

Genus of flowering plants

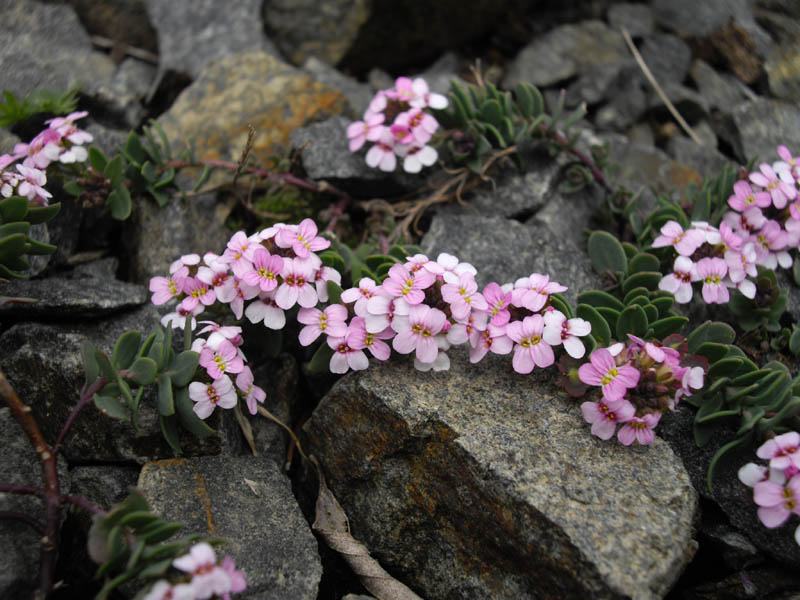
Aethionema saxatile

Aethionema is a genus of flowering plants within the family Brassicaceae. They are known as stonecresses. Stonecresses originate from sunny limestone mountainsides in Europe and West Asia, especially Turkey. It is the only genus in the subfamily Aethionemoideae.

Aethionema have typically perennials, but may be annuals. Their leaves are ovate or linear.

== Etymology ==
The English name "stonecress" derives from its creeping habit and its favoured stony or rocky sites.

== Taxonomy ==
Aethionema is sister to the rest of the genera in the Brassicaceae. The two clades diverged some time during the Eocene.

Species include:

- Aethionema alanyae H.Duman
- Aethionema alidaghenicum Yild.
- Aethionema annuum Yild.
- Aethionema apetalum Yild. & Kiliç
- Aethionema arabicum (L.) Andrz. ex DC.
- Aethionema armenum Boiss.
- Aethionema bingoelicum Yild. & Kiliç
- Aethionema capitatum Boiss. & Balansa
- Aethionema carlsbergii Strid & Papan.
- Aethionema carneum (Banks & Sol.) B.Fedtsch.
- Aethionema compactum (Hartvig & Å.Strid) Yild.
- Aethionema cordatum (Desf.) Boiss.
- Aethionema coridifolium DC. – Lebanon stonecress
- Aethionema demirizii P.H.Davis & Hedge
- Aethionema diastrophis Bunge
- Aethionema dincii Yild.
- Aethionema dumanii Vural & Adigüzel
- Aethionema dumelicum Yild.
- Aethionema edentulum N.Busch
- Aethionema erinaceum (Boiss.) Khosravi & Mumm.
- Aethionema ertughrulii Yild.
- Aethionema erzincanum Kandemir & Aytaç
- Aethionema eunomioides (Boiss.) Bornm.
- Aethionema fimbriatum Boiss.
- Aethionema froedinii Rech.f.
- Aethionema gileadense Post
- Aethionema glaucinum Greuter, Burdet, I.A.Andersson, Carlström, Franzén, Karlén & Nybom
- Aethionema grandiflorum Boiss. & Hohen. – Persian stonecress
- Aethionema heterocarpum J.Gay
- Aethionema heterophyllum (Boiss. & Buhse) Boiss.
- Aethionema huber-morathii P.H.Davis & Hedge
- Aethionema karamanicum Ertugrul & Beyazoglu
- Aethionema kilicii Yild.
- Aethionema lepidioides Hub.-Mor.
- Aethionema levandowskyi N.Busch
- Aethionema lycium I.A.Andersson, Carlström, Franzén, Karlén & H.Nybom
- Aethionema marashicum P.H.Davis
- Aethionema membranaceum DC.
- Aethionema munzurense P.H.Davis & Yild.
- Aethionema orbiculatum (Boiss.) Hayek
- Aethionema ozbekii Yild.
- Aethionema papillosum P.H.Davis
- Aethionema retsina Phitos & Snogerup
- Aethionema rhodopaeum D.K.Pavlova
- Aethionema sabzevaricum Khosravi & Joharchi
- Aethionema saxatile (L.) W.T.Aiton
- Aethionema schistosum Boiss. & Kotschy
- Aethionema semnanensis Mozaff.
- Aethionema speciosum Boiss. & A.Huet
- Aethionema spicatum Post
- Aethionema stylosum DC.
- Aethionema subulatum (Boiss. & Heldr.) Boiss.
- Aethionema syriacum (Boiss.) Bornm.
- Aethionema thesiifolium Boiss. & Heldr.
- Aethionema thomasianum J.Gay
- Aethionema transhyrcanum (Czerniak.) N.Busch
- Aethionema turanicum Yild.
- Aethionema turcica H.Duman & Aytaç
- Aethionema virgatum (Boiss.) Hedge
- Aethionema yildirimlii Kiliç

== Cultivation ==
Aethionema species are grown for their profuse racemes of cruciform flowers in shades of red, pink or white, usually produced in spring and early summer. A favoured location is the rock garden or wall crevice. They appreciate well-drained alkaline soil conditions, but can be short-lived. The hybrid cultivar 'Warley Rose' is a subshrub with bright pink flowers. It has gained the Royal Horticultural Society's Award of Garden Merit.
