= Threatened mammals of Europe =

Mammals by conservation status

The list below contains threatened mammals that dwell in or migrate to any region in Europe, the East Atlantic Ocean, and any nearby islands of the Atlantic Ocean. This includes mammals that are found in the East Atlantic Ocean (Azores), Iceland, the Adriatic Sea, the Sea of Azov, the Black and Caspian Sea, Corsica, Cyprus, Palearctic, Russia, Eurasia, North African Coast, the Mediterranean Sea and islands located in the Mediterranean Sea, and the islands of Spain (Canary, Balearic). The list below was compiled from data on the IUCN Red List of Endangered Species (IUCN). The International Union for Conservation of Nature identifies species in need of attention before approaching extinction and works to increase prevention of extinction. The list below includes vulnerable (VU), endangered (EN), critically endangered (CR), and recently extinct (EX) species.

Scientific name	Common name(s)	Distribution	Status	Image
Ammotragus lervia	Aoudad, Barbary sheep, uaddan	Extant, native: Algeria; Chad; Egypt; Libya; Mali; Mauritania; Morocco; Niger; Sudan; Tunisia; Western Sahara Extant, introduced: Croatia; Italy; Mexico; Spain (Canary Is.); United States	VU	
Balaenoptera borealis	Sei whale	Extant: Worldwide	EN	
Balaenoptera musculus	Blue whale	Extant: Worldwide	EN	
Balaenoptera physalus	Fin whale	Extant: Worldwide	VU	
Bos primigenius	Aurochs	Extinct: Bulgaria; Poland; Romania	EX	
Cricetus cricetus	European hamster, common hamster	Extant: Austria; Belarus; Belgium; Bulgaria; Czechia; France; Germany; Hungary; Kazakhstan; Moldova; Netherlands; Poland; Romania; Russian Federation; Serbia; Slovakia; Slovenia; Switzerland; Ukraine Presence Uncertain: Bosnia and Herzegovina; China; Croatia; Georgia	CR	
Crocidura canariensis	Canarian shrew, Canary shrew	Extant: Spain (Canary Is.)	EN	
Crocidura zimmermanni	Cretan white-toothed shrew, Cretan shrew	Extant: Greece (Kriti)	EN	
Cystophora cristata	Hooded seal	Extant, resident: Canada; Greenland; Iceland; Norway; Svalbard and Jan Mayen Extant, vagrant: Denmark; France; Germany; Ireland; Portugal; Russia; Spain; United Kingdom; Antigua and Barbuda; Bahamas; Bermuda; Puerto Rico; Saint Barthélemy; Turks and Caicos Islands; United States	EN	
Desmana moschata	Russian desman	Extant: Kazakhstan; Russia; Ukraine Extirpated: Belarus	CR	
Dinaromys bogdanovi	Balkan snow vole	Extant: Albania; Bosnia and Herzegovina; Croatia; Montenegro; North Macedonia; Serbia	VU	
Eliomys quercinus	Garden dormouse	Extant: Andorra; Austria; Belgium; Bosnia and Herzegovina; Croatia; Czechia; France; Germany; Italy; Luxembourg; Netherlands; Poland; Portugal; Russian Federation (European Russia); Slovenia; Spain; Switzerland Possibly extirpated: Belarus; Estonia; Finland; Latvia; Lithuania; Slovakia; Ukraine Uncertain status: Romania	VU	
Eubalaena glacialis	North Atlantic right whale	Extant: Bahamas; Bermuda; Canada; United States; Greenland; Iceland; Norway Possibly extirpated: Belgium; Faroe Islands; France; Germany; Ireland; Morocco; Netherlands; Portugal; Spain; United Kingdom; Western Sahara	CR	
Galemys pyrenaicus	Pyrenean desman, Iberian desman	Extant: Andorra; France; Portugal; Spain	EN	
Hydropotes inermis	Chinese water deer	Extant, native: China; North Korea; South Korea Introduced: France; United Kingdom	VU	
Lepus castroviejoi	Broom hare	Extant: Spain	VU	
Lepus corsicanus	Corsican hare	Extant: Italy; Sicilly Introduced: Corsica	VU	
Lynx pardinus	Iberian lynx	Extant: Spain Reintroduced: Portugal	VU	
Macaca sylvanus	Barbary macaque	Extant: Algeria; Morocco Extirpated: Tunisia Introduced: Gibraltar	EN	
Mesocricetus newtoni	Romanian hamster	Extant: Bulgaria; Romania	VU	
Microtus bavaricus	Bavarian pine vole	Extant: Austria Extirpated: Germany	CR	
Monachus monachus	Mediterranean monk seal	Extant: Albania; Cyprus; Greece; Mauritania; Portugal (Madeira); Turkey; Western Sahara Possibly extinct: Egypt; Israel; Italy; Lebanon; Libya; Montenegro; Palestine; Spain; Syria Extirpated: Algeria; Bosnia and Herzegovina; Bulgaria; Cabo Verde; France; Gambia; Georgia; Malta; Monaco; Morocco; Portugal; Romania; Russia; Senegal; Slovenia; Tunisia; Ukraine Presence uncertain: Croatia	VU	
Mustela lutreola	European mink	Extant: France; Romania; Russia; Spain; Ukraine Extant, reintroduced: Estonia Extirpated: Austria; Belarus; Bulgaria; Croatia; Czechia; Finland; Georgia; Germany; Hungary; Kazakhstan; Latvia; Lithuania; Moldova; Montenegro; Netherlands; Poland; Serbia; Slovakia; Switzerland	CR	
Myomimus roachi	Roach's mouse-tailed dormouse	Extant: Bulgaria; Greece; Turkey	VU	
Myotis capaccinii	Long-fingered bat	Extant: Albania; Algeria; Andorra; Bosnia and Herzegovina; Bulgaria; Croatia; Cyprus; France (Corsica); Greece (Kriti); Holy See; Iran; Iraq; Israel; Italy (Sicilia, Sardegna); Jordan; Lebanon; Montenegro; Morocco; North Macedonia; Romania; Serbia; Slovenia; Spain (Baleares); Syria; Turkey Extirpated: Switzerland	VU	
Nyctalus azoreum	Azores noctule, Azorean bat	Extant: Portugal (Azores)	VU	
Phocoena phocoena ssp. relicta	Black Sea harbour porpoise	Extant: Bulgaria; Georgia; Romania; Russia; Turkey; Ukraine	VU	
Physeter macrocephalus	Sperm whale	Extant: Worldwide	VU	
Pipistrellus hanaki	Hanák's pipistrelle	Extant: Greece; Libya	VU	
Pipistrellus maderensis	Madeira pipistrelle, Murciélago de Madeira	Extant: Portugal (Azores, Madeira); Spain (Canary Is.)	EN	
Plecotus sardus	Sardinian long-eared bat	Extant: Italy (Sardegna)	CR	
Plecotus teneriffae	Tenerife long-eared bat, Canary big-eared bat	Extant: Spain (Canary Is.)	CR	
Prolagus sardus	Sardinian pika	Extinct: France (Corsica); Italy (Sardegna)	EX	
Rhinolophus mehelyi	Mehely's horseshoe bat	Extant: Afghanistan; Algeria; Armenia; Azerbaijan; Bosnia and Herzegovina; Bulgaria; Cyprus; Egypt; Georgia; Greece; Iran; Iraq; Israel; Italy (Sicilia, Sardegna); Jordan; Libya; Moldova; Montenegro; Morocco; North Macedonia; Palestine; Portugal; Romania; Russia; Serbia; Slovenia; Spain; Syria; Tunisia; Turkey Extirpated:Croatia Presence uncertain:France	VU	
Sicista loriger	Nordmann's birch mouse	Extant: Romania; Russia; Ukraine Presence uncertain: Moldova	CR	
Sicista severtzovi	Severtzov's birch mouse	Extant: Russia (Europe)		
Sicista trizona	Hungarian birch mouse	Extant: Hungary; Romania Extirpated: Austria; Serbia; Slovakia	EN	
Spalax antiquus	Méhely’s blind mole-rat	Extant: Romania	EN	
Spalax arenarius	Sandy mole-rat	Extant: Ukraine	EN	
Spalax graecus	Bukovina blind mole-rat	Extant: Romania; Ukraine	VU	
Spalax istricus	Oltenia blind mole-rat	Possibly extinct: Romania	CR	
Spalax zemni	Podolian mole-rat	Extant: Ukraine	EN	
Spermophilus citellus	European ground squirrel	Extant: Austria; Bulgaria; Czechia; Greece; Hungary; Moldova; North Macedonia; Romania; Serbia; Slovakia; Turkey; Ukraine Extant, reintroduced: Poland Extirpated: Croatia; Germany	EN	
Spermophilus suslicus	Speckled ground squirrel	Extant: Belarus; Moldova; Poland; Russia; Ukraine	CR	
Ursus maritimus	Polar bear	Extant: Canada; Greenland; Norway; Russia; Svalbard and Jan Mayen; United States (Alaska) Presence uncertain, vagrant: Iceland	VU	
Vormela peregusna	Marbled polecat	Extant: Afghanistan; Armenia; Azerbaijan; Bulgaria; China; Egypt (Sinai); Georgia; Greece; Iran; Iraq; Israel; Kazakhstan; Lebanon; Mongolia; Montenegro; North Macedonia; Pakistan; Romania; Russia; Serbia; Syria; Turkmenistan; Turkey; Ukraine; Uzbekistan	VU	

== See also ==
- Endangered plants of Europe
- IUCN Red List
