= Aethionema subulatum =

Scientific classification
- Kingdom: Plantae
- Clade: Tracheophytes
- Clade: Angiosperms
- Clade: Eudicots
- Clade: Rosids
- Order: Brassicales
- Family: Brassicaceae
- Genus: Aethionema
- Species: A. subulatum

Binomial name
- Aethionema subulatum (Boiss. & Heldr.) Boiss.

Synonyms
- Eunomia subulata Boiss. & Heldr.

Species of flowering plant

Aethionema subulatum is a species of stonecress in the family Brassicaceae. It is native to Turkey.

== Description ==
Aethionema subulatum is a perennial plant which grows up to 10 cm (3.9 in) tall in dense tufts and with a woody base. Its leaves grow to 5 mm (0.20 in) long in the shape of an awl, and are tightly packed. It has pink flowers, each of which can be up to 1 cm (0.39 in) across.
