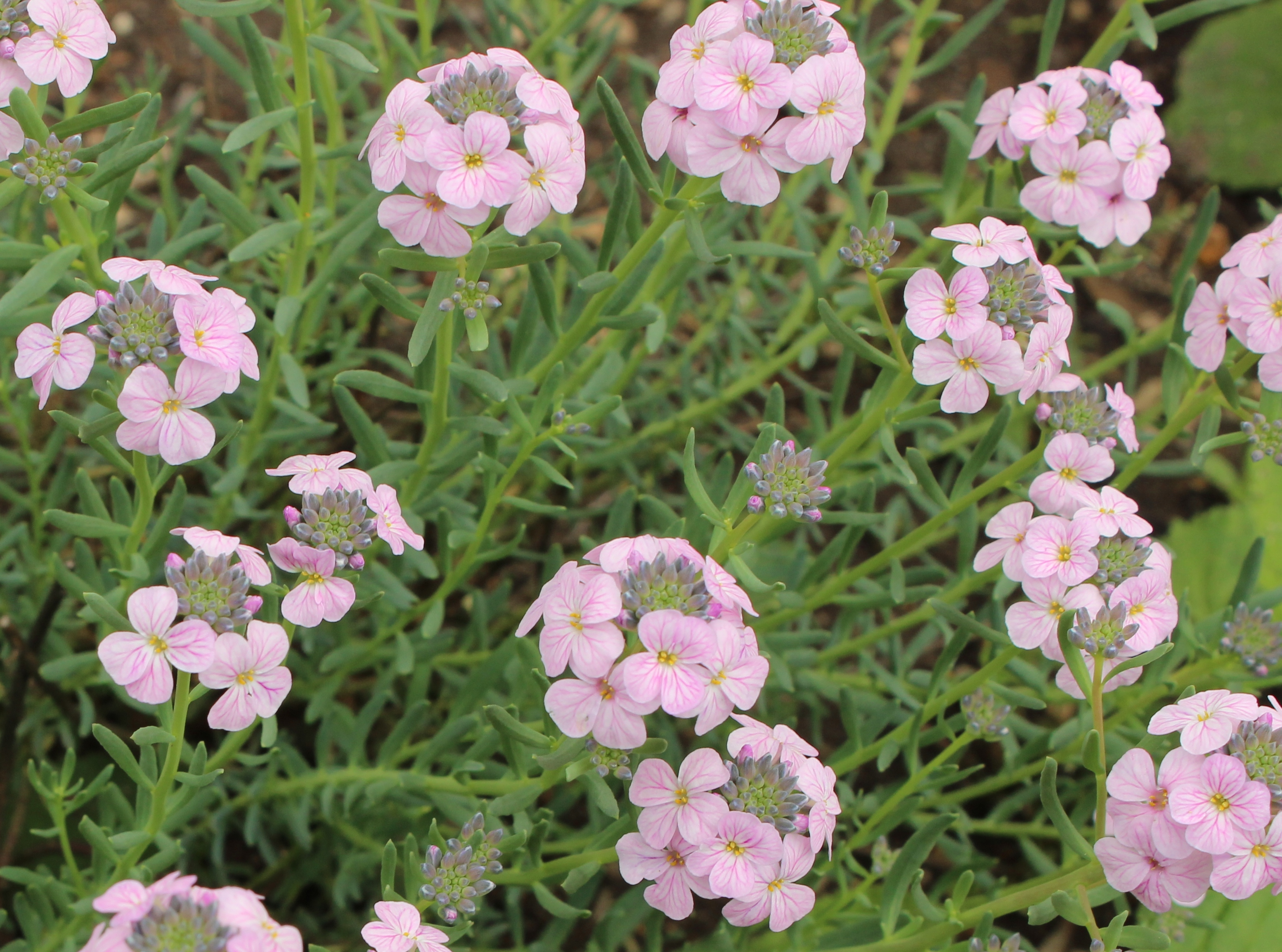

Scientific classification
- Kingdom: Plantae
- Clade: Tracheophytes
- Clade: Angiosperms
- Clade: Eudicots
- Clade: Rosids
- Order: Brassicales
- Family: Brassicaceae
- Genus: Aethionema
- Species: A. armenum

Binomial name
- Aethionema armenum Boiss.

Synonyms
- Aethionema polygaloides Ledeb.; Aethionema pseudarmenum Stapf & Sprague; Aethionema recurvum Hausskn. & Bornm.

= Aethionema armenum =

Species of flowering plant

Aethionema armenum, also called rock cress, stonecress, or Persian candytuft, is a low-growing evergreen shrub in the family Brassicaceae native to the Mediterranean. There, it is typically found on rocky slopes above 800 meters.

== Description ==
Aethionema armenum produces blue-green linear leaves less than an inch long. The plant, which consists of sprawling stems that are woody at the base and herbaceous at the tips, typically reaches about 4 inches tall and 8 or more inches across. The flowers, which appear in mid-spring to early summer, are typically white or pink and 6 millimeters or more across.

== Cultivation ==
Aethionema armenum does best in full sun and neutral to alkaline soil. In the US, it is suitable to be grown outside in hardiness zones 5–7. 'Warley Rose' is a common cultivar which has won the Royal Horticultural Society's Award of Garden Merit. It is susceptible to aphids and red spider mites.
