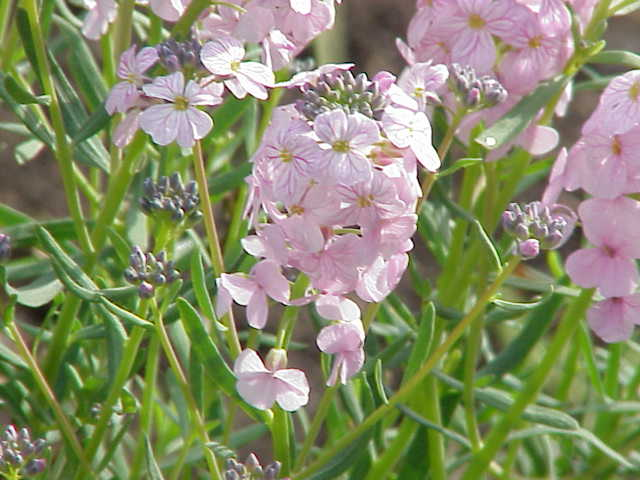

Scientific classification
- Kingdom: Plantae
- Clade: Tracheophytes
- Clade: Angiosperms
- Clade: Eudicots
- Clade: Rosids
- Order: Brassicales
- Family: Brassicaceae
- Genus: Aethionema
- Species: A. grandiflorum

Binomial name
- Aethionema grandiflorum Boiss. & Hohen.

Synonyms
- Aethionema coridifolium Boiss.; Aethionema levandowskyi Busch; Aethionema pallidiflorum Hausskn. & Bornm. ex Bornm.; Aethionema pulchellum Boiss. & A. Huet; Aethionema grandiflora; Aethionema sintenisii Hausskn. & Bornm.; Aethionema grandiflorum var. sintenisii (Hausskn. & Bornm.) Govaerts

= Aethionema grandiflorum =

Species of plant in the family Brassicaceae

Aethionema grandiflorum, commonly known as Persian stonecress or Persian candytuft, is a flowering plant in the family Brassicaceae, preferring to grow at 750 to 2600 m on limestone slopes. It is sometimes kept as a garden plant, and occasionally naturalizes outside its original range of eastern Turkey, the southern Caucasus and northern Iran. It is a recipient of the RHS's Award of Garden Merit.

== Description ==
Aethionema grandiflorum is a many-stemmed, short-lived perennial, typically forming 15 to 30 cm (at most 40 cm) tall spreading mounds. Its foliage is evergreen, and it has up to 15 pink to lilac cruciform flowers borne on terminal racemes. It prefers alkaline soils.

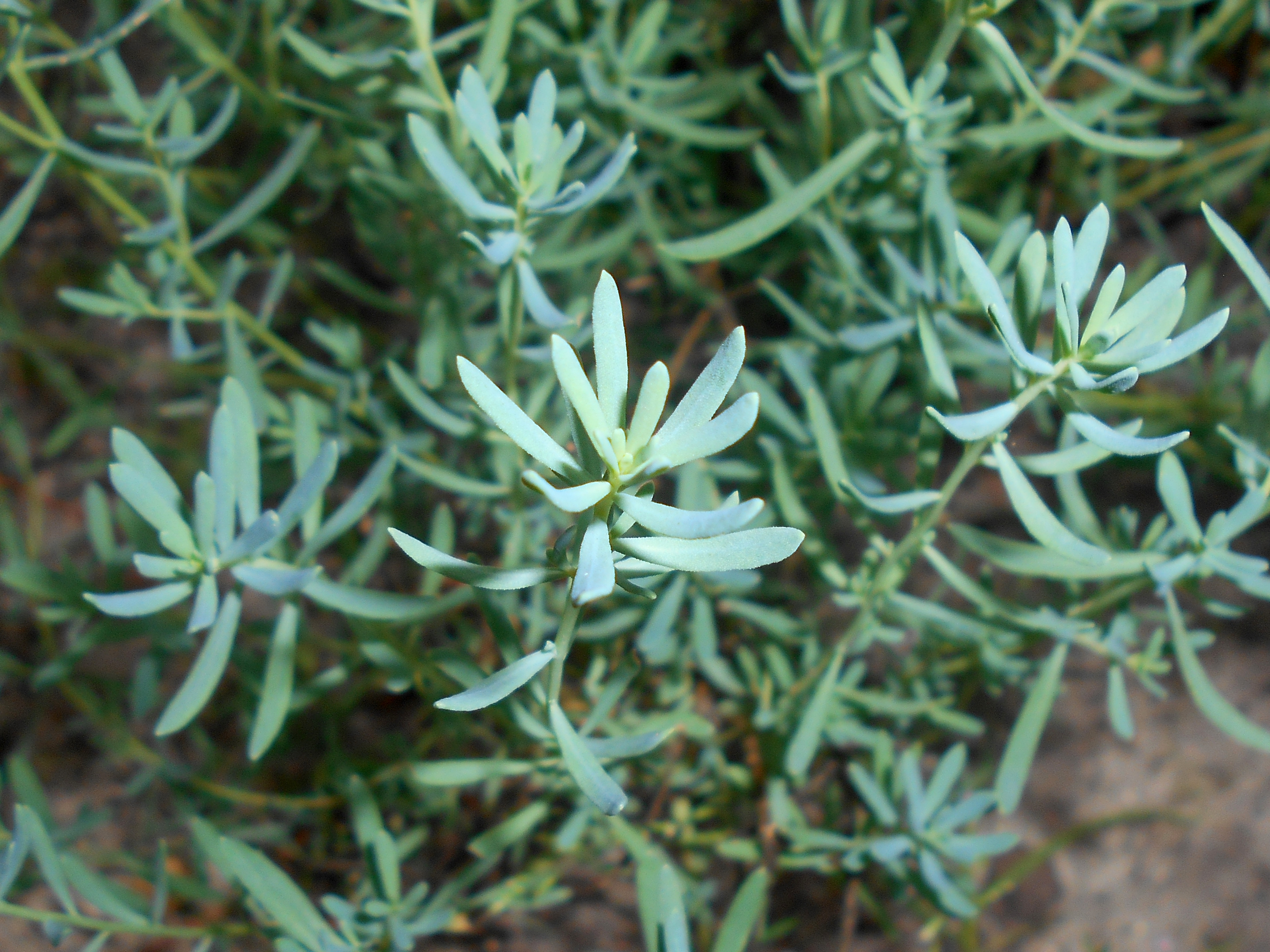
Foliage
