= Salvia herbanica =

Conservation status
- Critically Endangered (IUCN 3.1)

Scientific classification
- Kingdom: Plantae
- Clade: Tracheophytes
- Clade: Angiosperms
- Clade: Eudicots
- Clade: Asterids
- Order: Lamiales
- Family: Lamiaceae
- Genus: Salvia
- Species: S. herbanica

Binomial name
- Salvia herbanica A. Santos & M. Fernández

Species of herb

Salvia herbanica (Fuerteventuran sky sage) is a critically endangered perennial plant that is endemic to the Canary Islands, growing in the mountains of southern-central Fuerteventura, at 250 to 400 m (820 to 1,310 ft) elevation. In 2004 there were only 212 known plants in the wild, in ten locations, with fewer than 50 plants in each location. Habitat for the plant continues to shrink due to predation by herbivores (domesticated goats and sheep and wild rabbits and squirrels) . Less than 50 of the plants are safe from predation, with the rest of the plants in poor health.

Salvia herbanica is a densely branched shrub with dark green fascicled leaves that are up to 20 mm (0.79 in) long and 3 mm (0.12 in) wide. The flowers grow on terminal spikes with 6-8 whorls, with a dark purple calyx holding the corolla which is violet with white spots.
