= Delphinium iris =

Conservation status
- Critically Endangered (IUCN 3.1)

Scientific classification
- Kingdom: Plantae
- Clade: Tracheophytes
- Clade: Angiosperms
- Clade: Eudicots
- Order: Ranunculales
- Family: Ranunculaceae
- Genus: Delphinium
- Species: D. iris

Binomial name
- Delphinium iris Ilarslan & Kit Tan

Species of flowering plant

Delphinium iris is a species of flowering plant within the genus Delphinium and the family Ranunculaceae.

== Distribution and habitat ==
Delphinium iris is native to Turkey, where it is endemic to a single area of Northeast Anatolia. Only one population is known to exist in the wild.

This species grows in temperate and subalpine conditions where it can be found growing in shrubland habitats.

It grows at altitudes ranging between 1700 and 1920 m above sea level.

== Threats ==
Delphinium iris is threatened by agriculture and human activity within their range. The overgrazing of livestock and the harvesting of hay within their habitat has a negative impact on the survival of D. iris.

No conservation measures have been put in place to protect the species from extinction and the population is continuing to decline.
