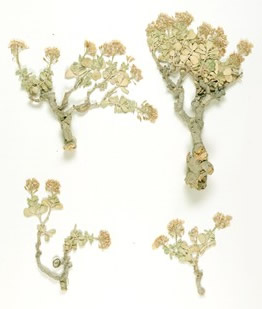

Conservation status
- Critically Endangered (IUCN 3.1)

Scientific classification
- Kingdom: Plantae
- Clade: Tracheophytes
- Clade: Angiosperms
- Clade: Eudicots
- Clade: Rosids
- Order: Brassicales
- Family: Brassicaceae
- Genus: Aethionema
- Species: A. retsina

Binomial name
- Aethionema retsina Phitos & Snogerup

= Aethionema retsina =

Species of flowering plant

Aethionema retsina is a species of flowering plant in the family Brassicaceae. It is a subshrub endemic to Greece, where it is native to the islands of Skyros and Skyropoula in the central Aegean. Its natural habitats are Mediterranean-type shrubby vegetation and rocky shores. It is threatened by habitat loss.
