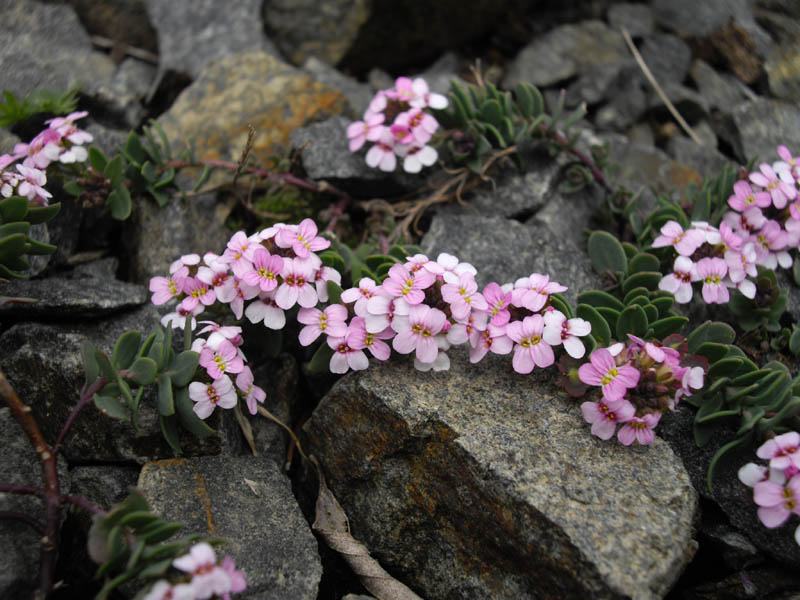

Scientific classification
- Kingdom: Plantae
- Clade: Tracheophytes
- Clade: Angiosperms
- Clade: Eudicots
- Clade: Rosids
- Order: Brassicales
- Family: Brassicaceae
- Genus: Aethionema
- Species: A. saxatile

Binomial name
- Aethionema saxatile (L.) R.Br.

= Aethionema saxatile =

Species of flowering plant

Aethionema saxatile, the burnt candytuft, is a species of flowering plant in the family Brassicaceae. It is found in the European Alps.
