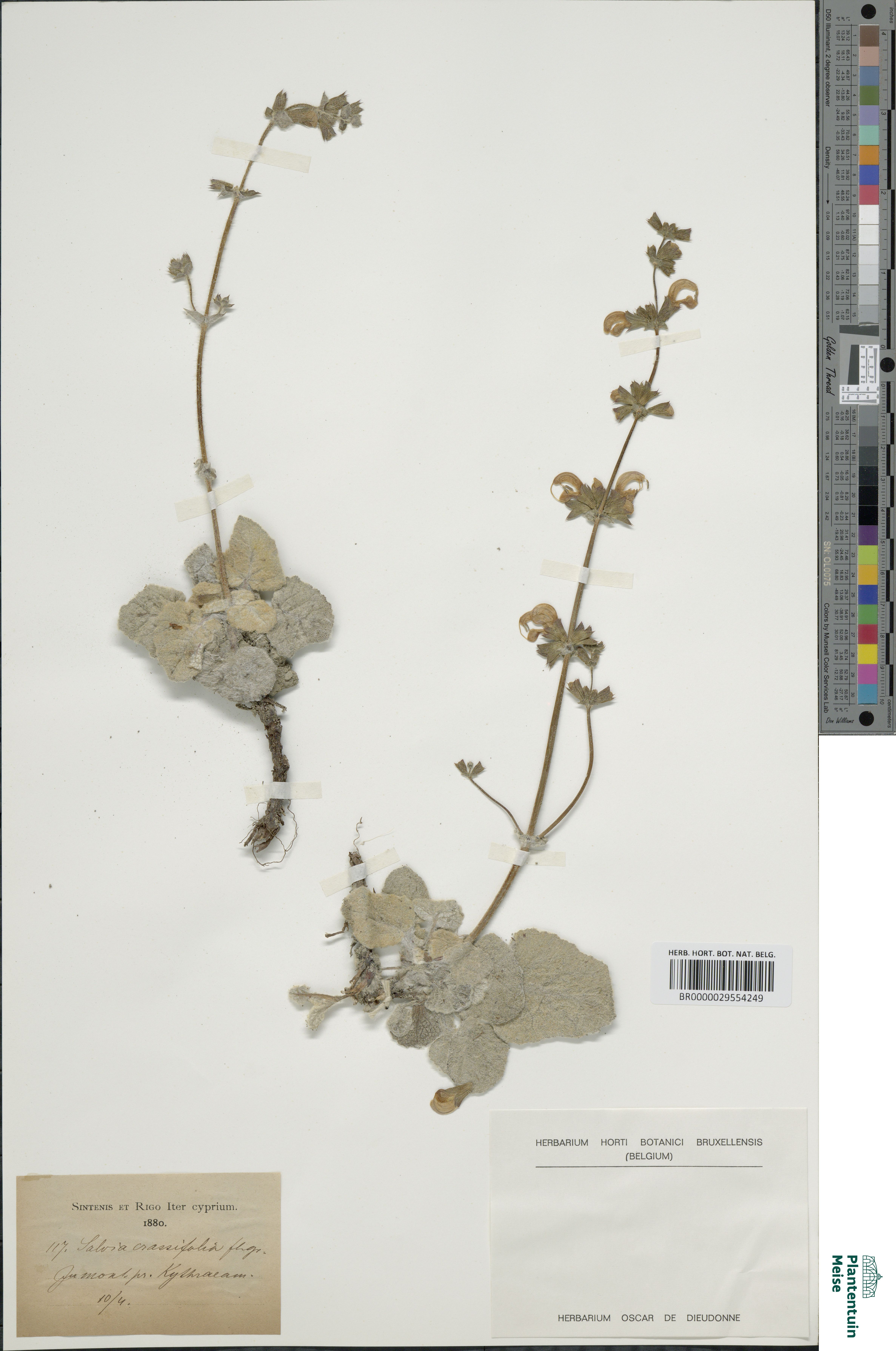

Conservation status
- Critically Endangered (IUCN 3.1)

Scientific classification
- Kingdom: Plantae
- Clade: Tracheophytes
- Clade: Angiosperms
- Clade: Eudicots
- Clade: Asterids
- Order: Lamiales
- Family: Lamiaceae
- Genus: Salvia
- Species: S. veneris

Binomial name
- Salvia veneris Hedge

Synonyms
- Salvia crassifolia Sibth. & Smith

= Salvia veneris =

Species of flowering plant

Salvia veneris, the Kythrean sage, is a species of flowering plant in the family Lamiaceae that is endemic to Cyprus. It is found in a very small area just west of the village of Kythrea. A study in 2004 found only approximately 4,000 surviving plants.

Salvia veneris has felt-like leaves growing in a basal rosette. The flowers are bi-colored, with the upper lip blue and the lower lip white with pale yellow markings. The stems give off a pleasant fragrance when crushed. The basal rosette leaf habit is unusual in the genus Salvia, and is thought to be an adaptation to grazing by goats.

== Sources ==
- de Montmollin, Bertrand; Wendy Strahm (2005). IUCN/SSC Mediterranean Islands Plant Specialist Group (ed.). The top 50 Mediterranean Island plants: wild plants at the brink of extinction, and what is needed to save them. IUCN. ISBN 978-2-8317-0832-4.
