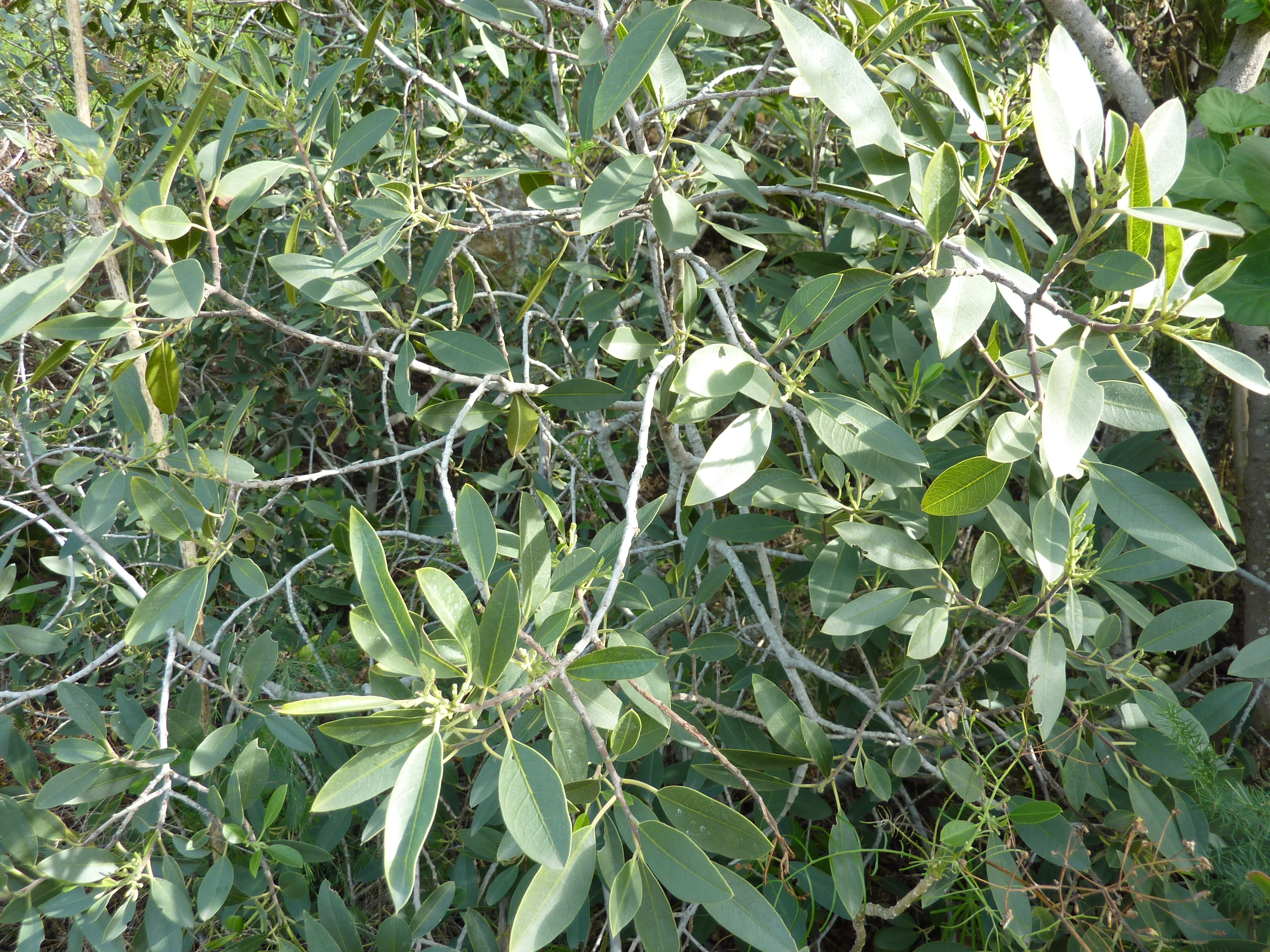

Conservation status
- Near Threatened (IUCN 3.1)

Scientific classification
- Kingdom: Plantae
- Clade: Tracheophytes
- Clade: Angiosperms
- Clade: Eudicots
- Clade: Rosids
- Order: Rosales
- Family: Rhamnaceae
- Genus: Rhamnus
- Species: R. integrifolia

Binomial name
- Rhamnus integrifolia DC.

= Rhamnus integrifolia =

Species of flowering plant

Rhamnus integrifolia, also known as moralito, is a species of flowering plant in the family Rhamnaceae.

== Distribution ==
It is endemic to the Canary Islands, and found only in the Cumbres and Barrancos, south of Tenerife. It grows in Mediterranean Matorral shrubland habitats.

The Canary Islands, located off the northeast coast of Africa in Macaronesia, are a territory of Spain.
