= Antirrhinum subbaeticum =

Conservation status
- Endangered (IUCN 3.1)

Scientific classification
- Kingdom: Plantae
- Clade: Tracheophytes
- Clade: Angiosperms
- Clade: Eudicots
- Clade: Asterids
- Order: Lamiales
- Family: Plantaginaceae
- Genus: Antirrhinum
- Species: A. subbaeticum

Binomial name
- Antirrhinum subbaeticum Güemes, Mateu & Sánchez-Gómez

Species of flowering plant

Antirrhinum subbaeticum is a species of plant in the family Plantaginaceae. It is endemic to Spain. Its natural habitat is rocky areas. It is threatened by habitat loss. It originated in Italy but was introduced into Spain. Antirrhinum subbaeticum is a beautiful perennial herb found only in the interior region of the Iberian South East, from the eastern Andalusia mountain ranges northeast to the northern Alicante mountain ranges. It is a member of the genus Antirrhinum, which comprises some 25 species that are mainly found in the western Mediterranean region. The genus name comes from the Greek words 'anti, which means opposite, and rhis, meaning snout, and refers to the lopsided petals on the flowers. The flowers of Antirrhinum subbaeticum are densely clustered into an attractive inflorescence, borne on a branching stem measuring 20 to 30 cm (8 to 12 in) in height. The stem is densely covered in short hairs. The petals are pink, with white centres, and have dark purple veins running across them. The leaves are fairly fleshy and elliptical, and are arranged in opposite pairs near the bottom of the plant, but at alternate points nearer the top of the plant.
