= Diplotaxis siettiana =

Conservation status
- Critically Endangered (IUCN 3.1)

Scientific classification
- Kingdom: Plantae
- Clade: Tracheophytes
- Clade: Angiosperms
- Clade: Eudicots
- Clade: Rosids
- Order: Brassicales
- Family: Brassicaceae
- Genus: Diplotaxis
- Species: D. siettiana

Binomial name
- Diplotaxis siettiana Maire

Species of flowering plant

Diplotaxis siettiana, known in Spanish as jaramago de Alborán, is a species of flowering plant in the family Brassicaceae. It is endemic to Alborán Island in the western Mediterranean Sea, where it grows only around the helipad. The natural population became extinct in 1974, but the species was re-introduced from ex-situ conservation in 1999. Its natural habitat is Mediterranean-type shrubby vegetation. It is threatened by habitat loss.

== Conservation ==
A 1970 observation had suggested that there were hundreds of plants, but only 150 were collected by 1974. In 1999, 48 plants were re-introduced by scientists, but it's unclear on population progress.
