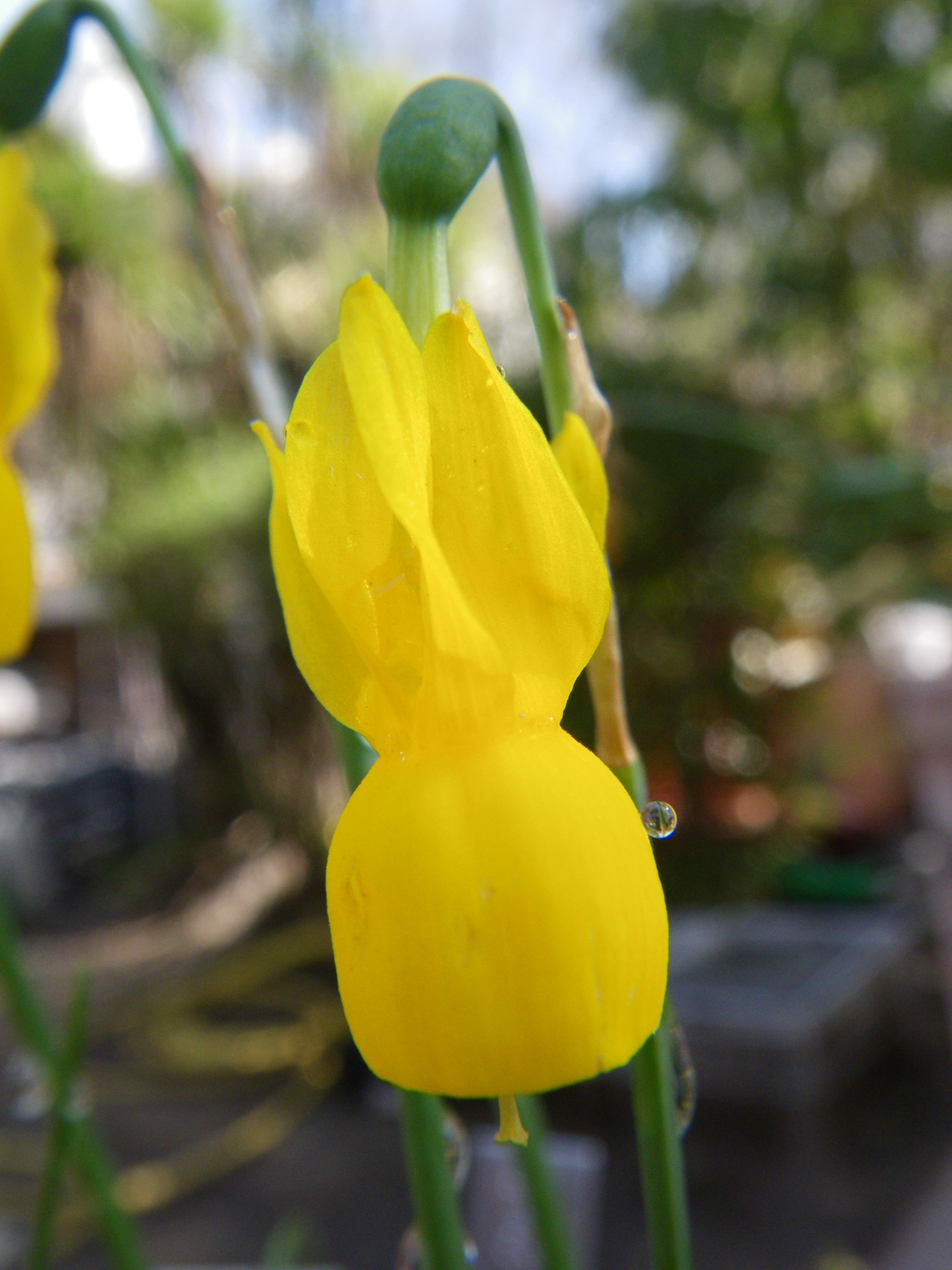

Scientific classification
- Kingdom: Plantae
- Clade: Tracheophytes
- Clade: Angiosperms
- Clade: Monocots
- Order: Asparagales
- Family: Amaryllidaceae
- Subfamily: Amaryllidoideae
- Genus: Narcissus
- Species: N. lusitanicus

Binomial name
- Narcissus lusitanicus Dorda & Fern.Casas

Synonyms
- Narcissus triandrus subsp. lusitanicus (Dorda & Fern.Casas) Barra

= Narcissus lusitanicus =

Species of daffodil

Narcissus lusitanicus is a species of the genus Narcissus (daffodils) in the family Amaryllidaceae. It is classified in Section Ganymedes. It is native to Portugal.

== Taxonomy ==
Opinions vary as the status of this taxon. It was raised to species rank in 2000 by Alvarez and Fernandez Casas, and is accepted by The Plant List and the World Checklist, but the Royal Horticultural Society still consider it a be the subspecies (see Synonyms). Genetic studies support species rank.
