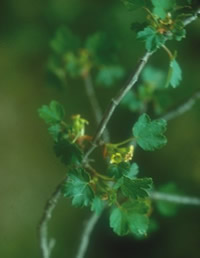

Conservation status
- Critically Endangered (IUCN 3.1)

Scientific classification
- Kingdom: Plantae
- Clade: Tracheophytes
- Clade: Angiosperms
- Clade: Eudicots
- Order: Saxifragales
- Family: Grossulariaceae
- Genus: Ribes
- Species: R. sardoum

Binomial name
- Ribes sardoum Martelli 1895

= Ribes sardoum =

Species of flowering plant

Ribes sardoum, commonly called Sardinian currant, is a species of plant in the gooseberry family. It is endemic to Italy, found only on the island of Sardinia.

== Distribution ==
There is only one known population of Ribes sardoum in Sardinia, occurring around 900 metres (3,000 ft) above sea level, in a small south-east facing valley. The species grows on limestone substrates.

Its natural habitats are in Mediterranean shrubby vegetation and rocky areas. It is an IUCN Red List Critically Endangered plant species and IUCN Top 50 Campaign Mediterranean Island Plants, threatened by habitat loss. The total number of individuals is about 100.
