= Carum foetidum =

Conservation status
- Near Threatened (IUCN 3.1)

Scientific classification
- Kingdom: Plantae
- Clade: Tracheophytes
- Clade: Angiosperms
- Clade: Eudicots
- Clade: Asterids
- Order: Apiales
- Family: Apiaceae
- Genus: Carum
- Species: C. foetidum

Binomial name
- Carum foetidum (Coss. & Durieu ex Batt.) Drude

Species of flowering plant

Carum foetidum is a species of flowering plant in the family Apiaceae. It is found in Algeria and Spain. Its natural habitats are rivers and saline marshes. It is threatened by habitat loss.
