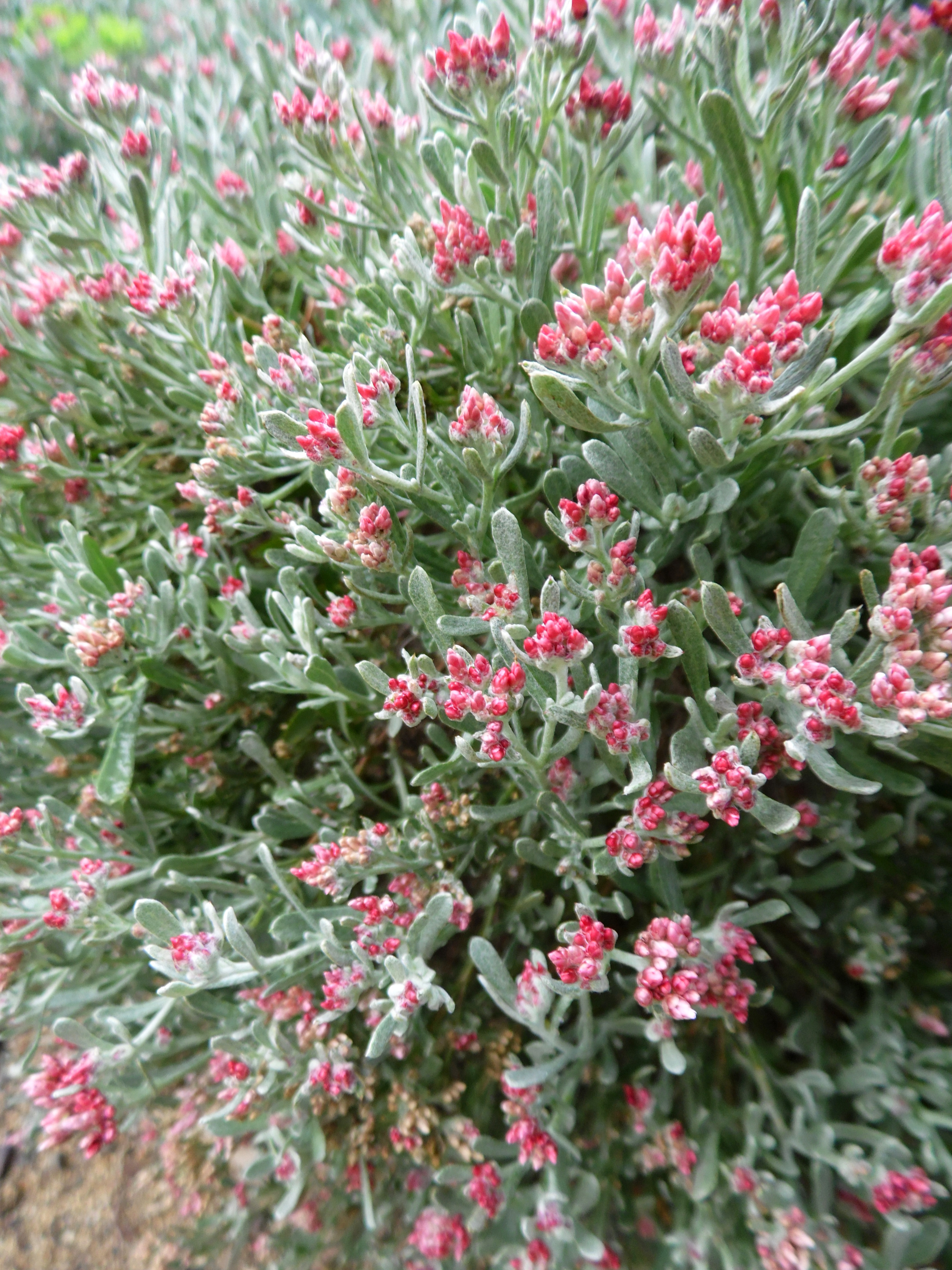

Conservation status
- Endangered (IUCN 3.1)

Scientific classification
- Kingdom: Plantae
- Clade: Tracheophytes
- Clade: Angiosperms
- Clade: Eudicots
- Clade: Asterids
- Order: Asterales
- Family: Asteraceae
- Genus: Helichrysum
- Species: H. monogynum

Binomial name
- Helichrysum monogynum B.L.Burtt & Sunding

= Helichrysum monogynum =

Species of flowering plant

Helichrysum monogynum, also known as red tinderbox, is a species of flowering plant within the family Asteraceae. It is a low shrub native to Lanzarote in the Canary Islands. The species is listed as endangered due to its restricted range within 8 km² of suitable habitat and the threat of habitat degradation due to urbanisation and recreational activities.

== Description ==
=== Leaves ===
The leaves of Helichrysum monogynum vary from 13 - 31 mm in length and 2 - 4 mm in width. Leaves can be lanceolate, oblanceolate, or narrowly spathulate, and they are more than five times longer than their width. H. monogynum lacks leaf rosettes.

=== Flowers ===
The capitulum is cylindrical or narrowly campanulate. The length of the capitulum varies from 3.5 to 45 mm. The capitula have a heterogamous sex ratio, meaning they contain both male and female flowers. H. monogynum is a hermaphrodite species, which possesses a low rate of seed germination. There are approximately 10 to 11 flowers per capitulum, with 1 to 2 being female and 7 to 10 being hermaphrodite. The corolla of the flowers is yellow with reddish lobes. The colour of the phyllaries (modified leaves surrounding the base of the flower) can be outer reddish or pinkish, while the inner ones are whiteish or all yellow.

== Distribution and habitat ==
Helichrysum monogynum is endemic to the Canary Islands, Spain, where it can only be found on the northeast side of the island of Lanzarote. It can be found growing at elevations ranging from 40–575 metres (130–1,890 ft) above sea level. There are currently only three populations known in three different locations: la Florida, Las Nieves and Montaña Cavera.

Helichrysum monogynum can be found growing on volcanic rock and sandy habitats near to the coast. It can also be found growing in nitrogen rich soils such as in locations of abandoned crop fields and on the verges of paths and roads. It is a species that is associated with shrubland, rocky areas, cliffs and mountain peaks.

== Ecology ==
Helichrysum monogynum is often associated with xerophytic communities where it can be found alongside plant species such as: Launaea arborescens, Helianthemum canariense, Kleinia neriifolia, Euphorbia regis-jubae, Caroxylon vermiculatum.
