= Alboran Island =

Spanish island in the western Mediterranean

Alborán
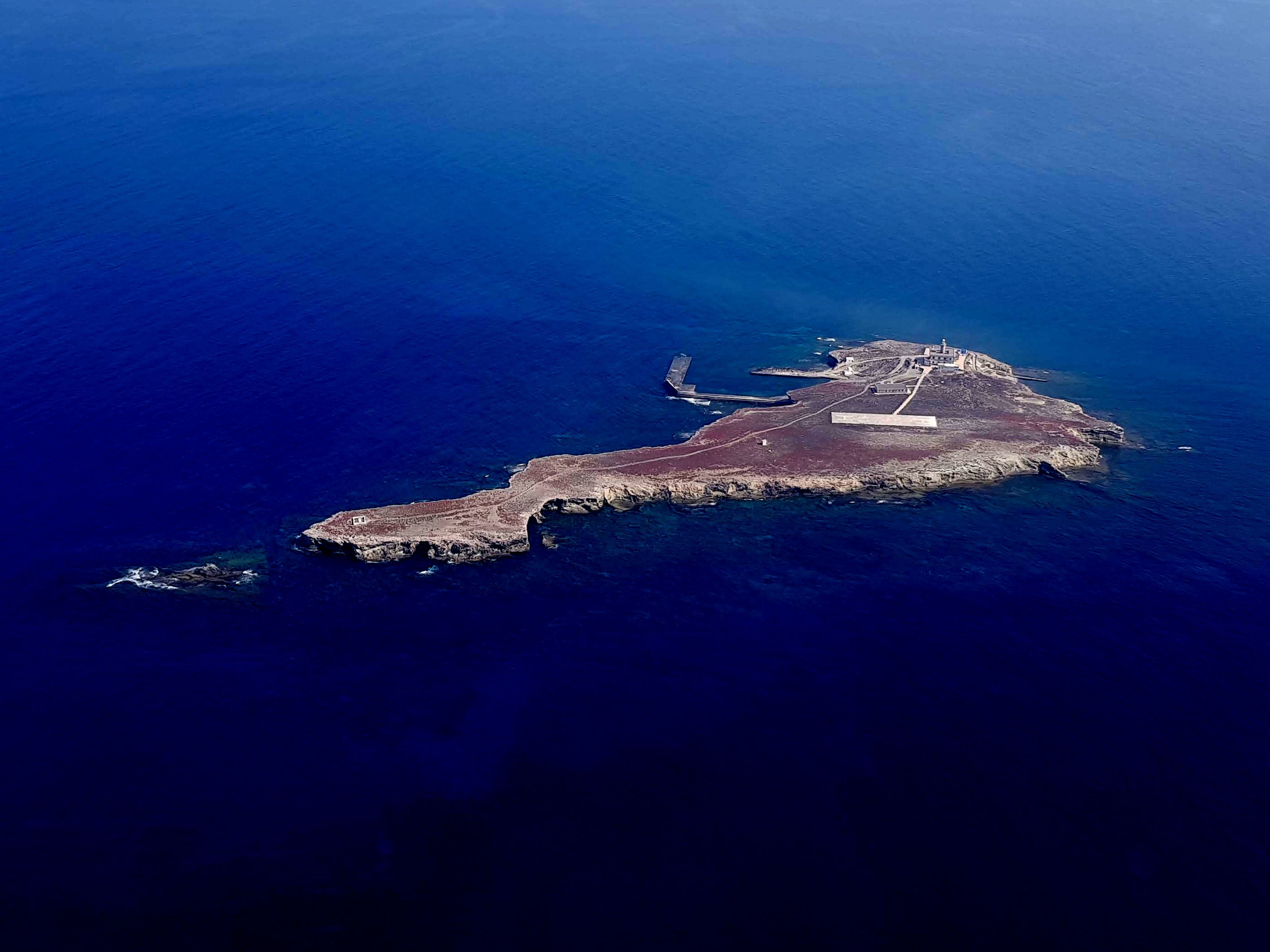

- Location of Alborán Island in Spain Location of Alborán Island in Andalusia

Geography
- Location: Alboran Sea
- Coordinates: 35°56′22″N 03°02′07″W
- Area: 0.07 km^{2} (0.027 sq mi)
- Highest elevation: 15 m (49 ft)

Administration
- Spain
- Province: Province of Almería
- Municipality: Almería

Demographics
- Population: military staff only

Alboran Island (Spanish: Isla de Alborán) is a small islet of Spain (province of Almería) in the Alboran Sea, part of the western Mediterranean Sea, about 56 kilometres (35 mi; 30 nmi) north of the Moroccan coast and 85 kilometres (53 mi; 46 nmi) from the Spanish mainland. The main buildings are an automated lighthouse built in the 19th century, a small cemetery, and a harbour.

== Description ==
The island is a flat platform about 15 metres (49 feet) above sea level and about 71,200 m^{2} (17.6 acres; 7.1 ha) in area. 100 m (328 ft) off the northeastern end of the island is the small islote de La Nube (literally, islet of the cloud).

== Natural history ==
Alboran has a volcanic origin, located in an important seismic zone where the African plate collides with the Eurasian plate. In 1899, a new igneous rock was discovered on Alboran, with the name of alboranite, in honor of the island.

The islet has been recognised as an Important Bird Area (IBA) by BirdLife International because it supports a breeding population of Audouin's gulls as well as various species of passerines on migration.

The wall-rocket species Diplotaxis siettiana, known in Spanish as jaramago de Alborán ("Alborán dandelion"), has its only known wild population on the island. It was declared extinct in the wild in 1974, but was successfully reintroduced from ex-situ conservation stocks in 1999. The plant remains critically endangered, and only grows around the island's helipad.

In 2001, the United Nations declared the island and its seabed a Specially Protected Area of Mediterranean Importance.

== History ==
The island became a power base of Mustafa ben Yusuf al-Mahmudeddin (Arabic: مصطفى بن يوسف المحمود الدين), a Tunisian corsair in the Ottoman sultan's service whose attacks were so ferocious that he became known as Al-Borani (hence the island's name), from the Turkish for "thunderstorm". It became a Spanish possession after the Battle of Alboran in 1540.

Alborán has been known in error as "Albusama".

The aristocrat Archduke Ludwig Salvator of Austria visited the island and published in 1899 an illustrated book in German about the island.

In 1963, the Spanish army established a permanent detachment of Spanish Navy Marines for the control and protection of the island.

== Administration ==
The island has belonged to Spain since 1540, and to the municipality of Almería since the 19th century.
