= Croatia =

Country in Central and Southeastern Europe

Republic of Croatia Republika Hrvatska
- Flag Coat of arms
- Anthem: Lijepa naša domovino "Our Beautiful Homeland"
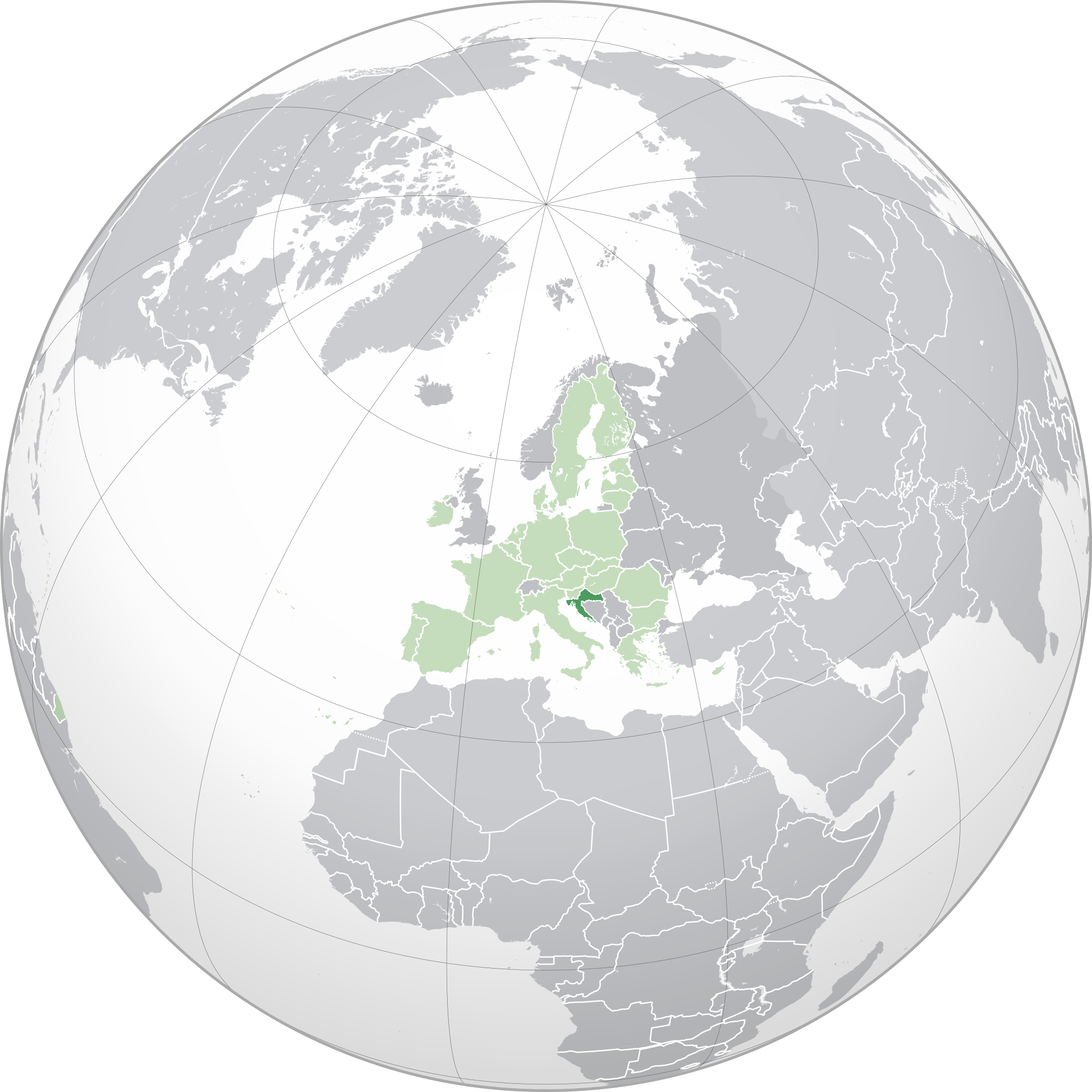
- Location of Croatia (dark green) – in Europe (green & dark grey) – in the European Union (green)
- Capital and largest city: Zagreb; 45°48′47″N 15°58′39″E
- Official languages: Croatian (Note: Based on article 12 of the Constitution of Croatia) (Note: Czech, German, Hungarian, Boyash Romanian, Istro-Romanian, Italian, Pannonian Rusyn, Romani, Serbian, Slovak, Slovene, and Ukrainian are recognised by the European Charter for Regional or Minority Languages)
- Ethnic groups (2021): 91.6% Croats; 3.2% Serbs; 5.2% others
- Religion (2021): 87.4% Christianity; 79.0% Catholicism; 3.3% Orthodoxy; 5.1% other Christian; 6.4% no religion; 1.3% Islam; 1.9% other; 3.9% undeclared
- Demonym: Croatian
- Government: Unitary parliamentary republic
  - President: Zoran Milanović
  - Prime Minister: Andrej Plenković
  - Speaker of the Croatian Parliament: Gordan Jandroković
- Legislature: Sabor

Establishment history
  - Duchy: 7th century
  - Kingdom: 925
  - Croatia in personal union with Hungary: 1102
  - Joined Habsburg Monarchy: 1 January 1527
  - Secession from Austria-Hungary: 29 October 1918
  - Creation of Yugoslavia: 4 December 1918
  - Socialist Republic of Croatia in Yugoslavia: 9 May 1944
  - Declaration of independence: 25 June 1991

Area
  - Total: 56,561 km^{2} (21,838 sq mi) (124th)
  - Water (%): 1.09

Population
  - 2025 estimate: ▲3,874,993 (128th)
  - 2021 census: ▼3,871,833 (128th)
  - Density: 68.4/km^{2} (177.2/sq mi) (152nd)
- GDP (PPP): 2026 estimate
  - Total: ▲$211.610 billion (81st)
  - Per capita: ▲$54,512 (40th)
- GDP (nominal): 2026 estimate
  - Total: ▲$115.915 billion (71st)
  - Per capita: ▲$29,860 (46th)
- Gini (2026): ▲30.0 medium inequality
- HDI (2023): ▲0.889 very high (41st)
- Currency: Euro (€) (EUR)
- Time zone: UTC+1 (CET)
  - Summer (DST): UTC+2 (CEST)
- Calling code: +385
- Internet TLD: .hr and .eu

Croatia, (Note: /kroʊˈeɪʃə/, kroh-AY-shə; Croatian: Hrvatska, pronounced [xř̩ʋaːtskaː]) officially the Republic of Croatia, (Note: Croatian: Republika Hrvatska, pronounced [repǔblika xř̩ʋaːtskaː].) is a country in Central and Southeastern Europe, on the coast of the Adriatic Sea. It borders Slovenia to the northwest, Hungary to the northeast, Serbia to the east, Bosnia and Herzegovina and Montenegro to the southeast, and shares a maritime border with Italy to the west. The Croatian archipelago contains over 1,000 islands and islets, the largest overseas territory on the Adriatic Sea. Its capital, largest city and main cultural and economic centre is Zagreb. Major urban centres include Split, Rijeka, and Osijek. The country is composed of twenty counties (Note: The city of Zagreb is classified as a special administrative unit within Croatia, operating as a "city-county". It is distinct and separate from Zagreb County which surrounds – but does not include – the capital city.) spanning 56,594 square kilometres (21,851 square miles) within four historical and cultural regions. Croatia has a population of nearly 3.9 million as of 2026.

Croatian history began with the 6th century arrival of the Croats to Roman Illyria. Settled as two duchies a century later, Croatia was granted independence in 878 under Duke Branimir and elevated into a kingdom under King Tomislav in 925. The Trpimirović dynastic succession crisis placed Croatia into a personal union with Hungary in 1102. In 1527, amid Ottoman conflict, Croatia aligned with the Habsburg monarchy. It reorganized into the State of Slovenes, Croats, and Serbs before merging into the Kingdom of Yugoslavia in 1918. During World War II, most of Croatia was invaded by the Axis powers who installed a puppet state known as the Independent State of Croatia. A resistance movement restored sovereignty, emerging as the Socialist Republic of Croatia within the Socialist Federal Republic of Yugoslavia in 1943. Croatia declared independence from Yugoslavia in 1991, successfully fighting the War of Independence until 1995.

Modern Croatia is a representative democracy with a prime minister, president, and unicameral parliament. Its constitution ensures separation of powers between the executive, legislative, and judicial branches. Croatian politics reflect a multi-party system. Croatia is part of many international organizations and forums including the European Union, United Nations, WTO, and NATO, among others. It exerts regional influence as a small power in Europe, particularly within neighboring Southeast Europe. Since 1999, the Croatian Armed Forces have deployed internationally for a variety of peacekeeping missions and military interventions. Croatia was elected to serve on the non-permanent seat of the UN Security Council from 2008 to 2009.

A developed country, Croatia has an advanced economy considered high-income and dominated by its service, industrial, and agricultural sectors. Its tourism sector is prominent, generating significant economic activity across the country. Croatia has heavily invested in infrastructure, especially in transport routes and facilities along European corridors. An emerging energy power in Europe, it has strategic investments in liquefied natural gas, geothermal networks, and electric transport. It has extensive biodiversity, wildlife, and natural resources across its geography. Croatia provides social security, universal health care, and subsidized primary and secondary education while supporting culture through media and publishing.

== Etymology ==
Croatia's non-native name derives from Medieval Latin Croātia, itself a derivation of North-West Slavic *Xərwate, by liquid metathesis from Common Slavic period *Xorvat, from proposed Proto-Slavic *Xъrvátъ which possibly comes from the 3rd-century Scytho-Sarmatian form attested in the Tanais Tablets as Χοροάθος (Khoroáthos. Alternate forms are Khoróatos and Khoroúathos). The origin of the ethnonym is uncertain, but most probably is from Proto-Ossetian / Alanian *xurvæt- or *xurvāt-, in the meaning of "one who guards" ("guardian, protector").

The oldest preserved record of the Croatian ethnonym's native variation *xъrvatъ is of the variable stem, attested in the Baška tablet in style zvъnъmirъ kralъ xrъvatъskъ ("Zvonimir, Croatian king"), while the Latin variation Croatorum is archaeologically confirmed on a church inscription found in Bijaći near Trogir dated to the end of the 8th or early 9th century. The presumably oldest stone inscription with fully preserved ethnonym is the 9th-century Branimir inscription found near Benkovac, where Duke Branimir is styled Dux Cruatorvm, likely dated between 879 and 892, during his rule. The Latin term Chroatorum is attributed to a charter of Duke Trpimir I of Croatia, dated to 852 in a 1568 copy of a lost original, but it is not certain if the original was found to be older than the Branimir inscription.

== History ==
=== Prehistory and antiquity ===
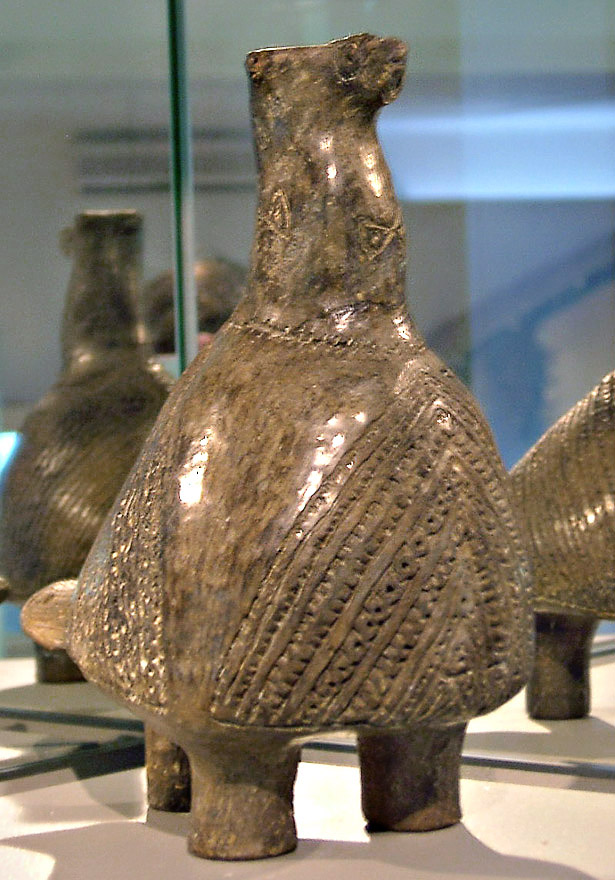
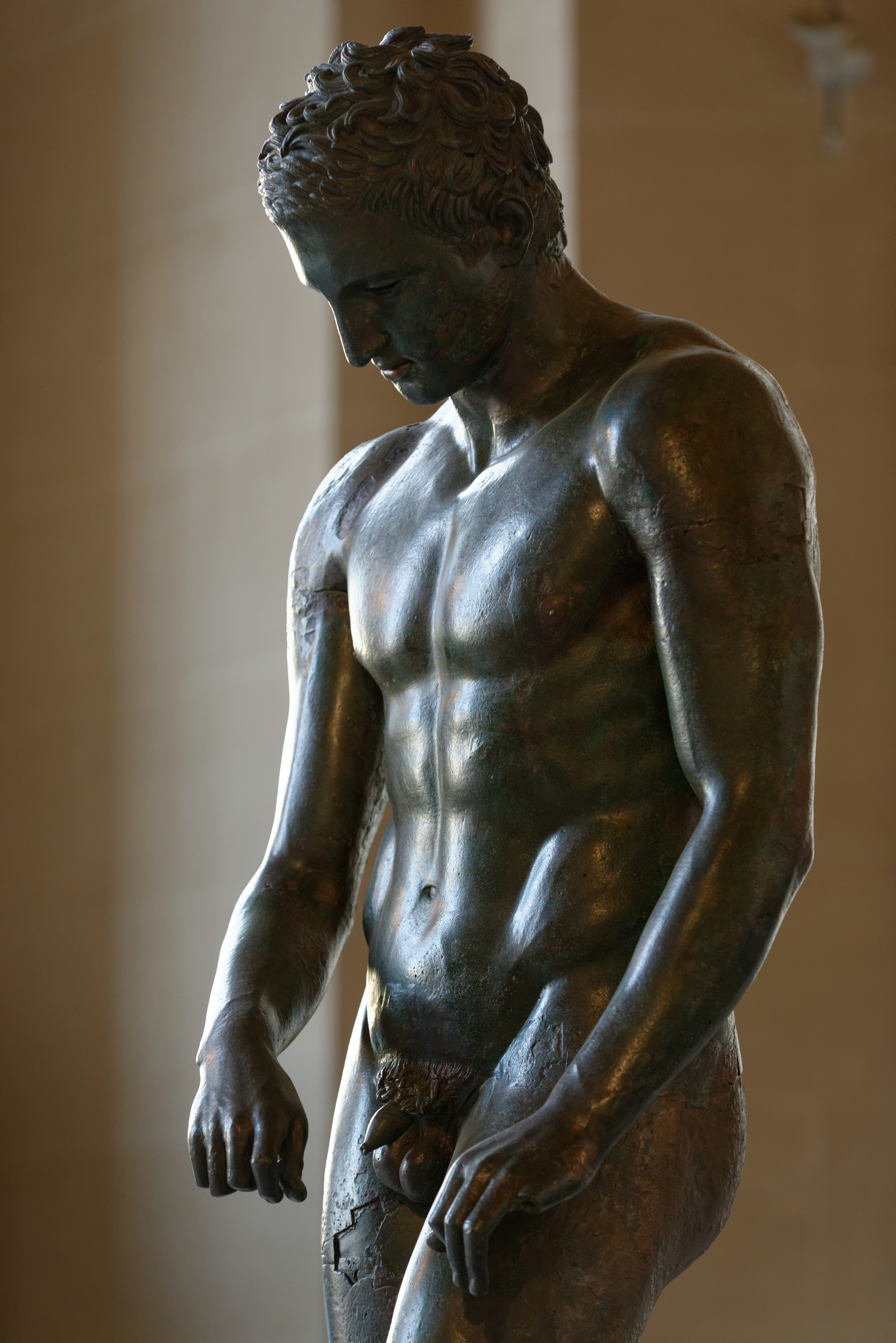
Left: The Vučedol dove, a sculpture from 2800 to 2500 BC.
Right: Croatian Apoxyomenos, Ancient Greek statue, 2nd or 1st century BC.

The area known as modern Croatia was inhabited throughout the prehistoric period. Neanderthal fossils dating to the middle Palaeolithic period were unearthed in northern Croatia, best presented at the Krapina site. Remnants of Neolithic and Chalcolithic cultures were found in all regions. The largest proportion of sites is in the valleys of northern Croatia. The most significant are Baden, Starčevo, and Vučedol cultures. Iron Age hosted the early Illyrian Hallstatt culture and the Celtic La Tène culture.

The region of modern-day Croatia was settled by Illyrians and Liburnians, while the first Greek colonies were established on the islands of Hvar, Korčula, and Vis. In 9 AD, the territory of today's Croatia became part of the Roman Empire. Emperor Diocletian was native to the region. He had a large palace built in Split, to which he retired after abdicating in AD 305. During the 5th century, the last de jure Western Roman Emperor Julius Nepos ruled a small realm from the palace after fleeing Italy in 475.

=== Middle Ages ===
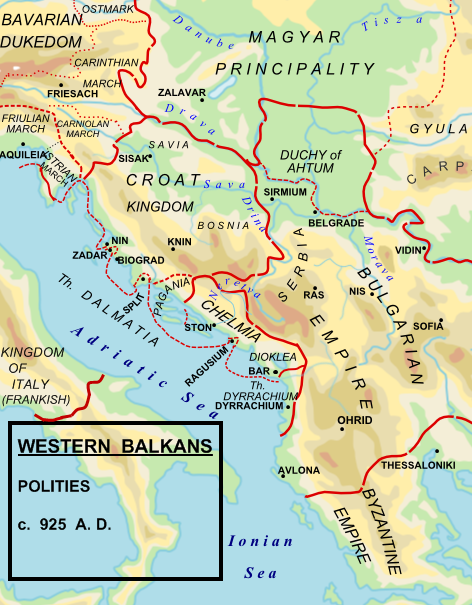
Kingdom of Croatia c. 925, during the reign of King Tomislav

The Roman period ends with Avar and Croat invasions in the late 6th and first half of the 7th century and the destruction of almost all Roman towns. Roman survivors retreated to more favourable sites on the coast, islands, and mountains. The city of Dubrovnik was founded by such survivors from Epidaurum.

The ethnogenesis of the Croats is a subject of scholarly discussion, reflecting the complexity of early medieval migrations and the integration of diverse populations. The predominant scholarly consensus, based on historical chronicles, proposes that the White Croats originated as a Slavic group that migrated from White Croatia during the Migration Period. Conversely, the Iranian theory proposes Sarmatian-Alanic origin of Proto-Croats, based on Tanais Tablets containing Ancient Greek inscriptions of given names Χορούαθος, Χοροάθος, and Χορόαθος (Khoroúathos, Khoroáthos, and Khoróathos) and their interpretation as anthroponyms related to the Croatian ethnonym.

According to the work De Administrando Imperio written by 10th-century Byzantine Emperor Constantine VII, Croats settled in the Roman province of Dalmatia in the first half of the 7th century after they defeated the Avars. Although there exist some scholarly disputes about the account's reliability and interpretation, recent archaeological data has established that the migration and settlement of the Slavs/Croats was in the late 6th and early 7th century. Eventually, a dukedom was formed, Duchy of Croatia, ruled by Borna, as attested by chronicles of Einhard starting in 818. The record represents the first document of Croatian realms, vassal states of Francia at the time. Its neighbor to the North was Principality of Lower Pannonia, at the time ruled by duke Ljudevit who ruled the territories between the Drava and Sava rivers, centered from his fort at Sisak. This population and territory throughout history was tightly related and connected to Croats and Croatia.

Christianisation of Croats began in the 7th century at the time of archon Porga of Croatia, initially probably encompassed only the elite and related people, but mostly finished by the 9th century. The Frankish overlordship ended during the reign of Mislav, or his successor Trpimir I. The native Croatian royal dynasty was founded by duke Trpimir I in the mid 9th century, who defeated the Byzantine and Bulgarian forces. The first native Croatian ruler recognised by the Pope was duke Branimir, who received papal recognition from Pope John VIII on 7 June 879. Tomislav was the first king of Croatia, noted as such in a letter of Pope John X in 925. Tomislav defeated Hungarian and Bulgarian invasions. The medieval Croatian kingdom reached its peak in the 11th century during the reigns of Petar Krešimir IV (1058–1074) and Dmitar Zvonimir (1075–1089). When Stjepan II died in 1091, ending the Trpimirović dynasty, Dmitar Zvonimir's brother-in-law Ladislaus I of Hungary claimed the Croatian crown. This led to a war and personal union with Hungary in 1102 under Coloman.

=== Union with Hungary and Austria ===
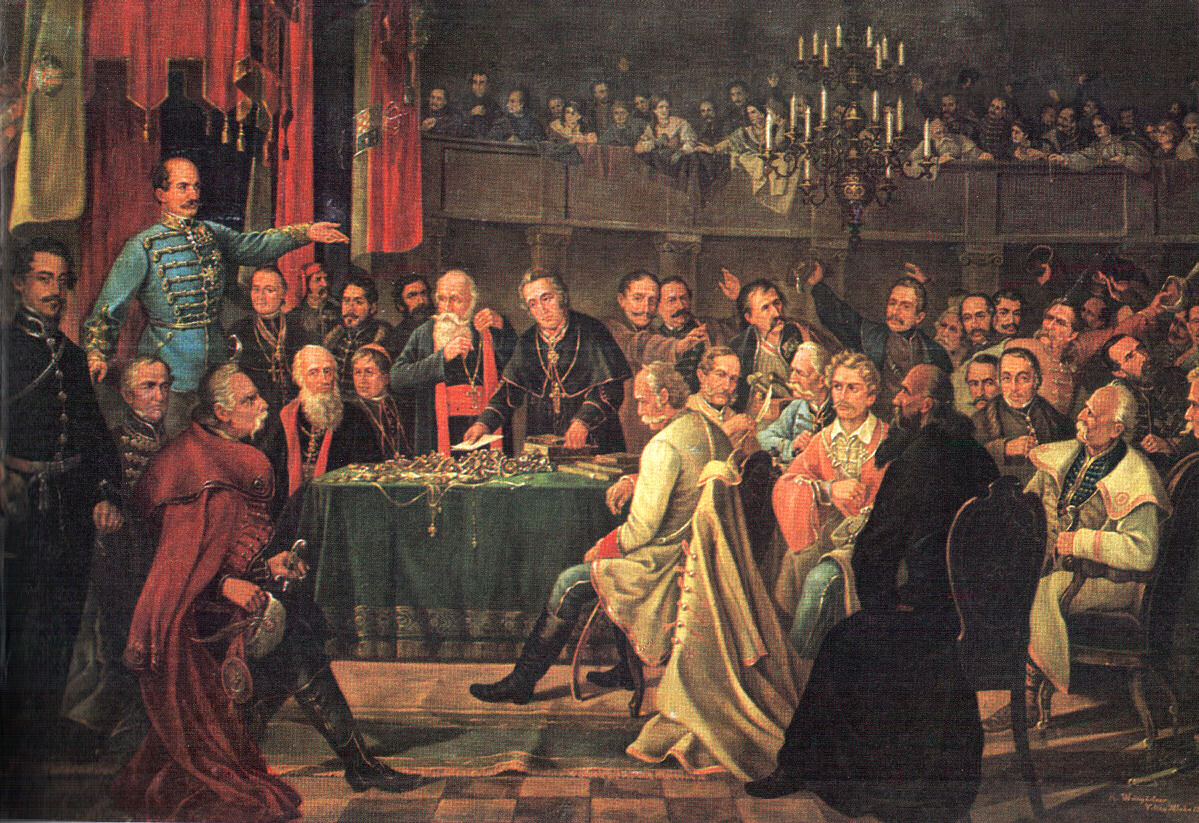
Ban Josip Jelačić at the opening of the first modern Croatian Parliament (Sabor), 5 June 1848. The Croatian tricolour flag can be seen in the background.

For the next four centuries, the Kingdom of Croatia was ruled by the Sabor (parliament) and a Ban (viceroy) appointed by the king. This period saw the rise of influential nobility such as the Frankopan and Šubić families to prominence, and ultimately numerous Bans from the two families. An increasing threat of Ottoman conquest and a struggle against the Republic of Venice for control of coastal areas ensued. The Venetians controlled most of Dalmatia by 1428, except the city-state of Dubrovnik, which became independent. Ottoman conquests led to the 1493 Battle of Krbava field and the 1526 Battle of Mohács, both ending in decisive Ottoman victories. King Louis II died at Mohács, and in 1527, the Croatian Parliament met in Cetin and chose Ferdinand I of the House of Habsburg as the new ruler of Croatia, under the condition that he protects Croatia against the Ottoman Empire while respecting its political rights.

Following the decisive Ottoman victories, Croatia was split into civilian and military territories in 1538. The military territories became known as the Croatian Military Frontier and were under direct Habsburg control. Ottoman advances in Croatia continued until the 1593 Battle of Sisak, the first decisive Ottoman defeat, when borders stabilised. During the Great Turkish War (1683–1698), Slavonia was regained, but western Bosnia, which had been part of Croatia before the Ottoman conquest, remained outside Croatian control. The present-day border between the two countries is a remnant of this outcome. Dalmatia, the southern part of the border, was similarly defined by the Fifth and the Seventh Ottoman–Venetian Wars.

The Ottoman wars drove demographic changes. During the 16th century, Croats from western and northern Bosnia, Lika, Krbava, the area between the rivers Una and Kupa, and especially from western Slavonia, migrated towards Austria. Present-day Burgenland Croats are direct descendants of these settlers. To replace the fleeing population, the Habsburgs encouraged Bosnians to provide military service in the Military Frontier. The Croatian Parliament supported King Charles III's Pragmatic Sanction and signed their own Pragmatic Sanction in 1712. Subsequently, the emperor pledged to respect all privileges and political rights of the Kingdom of Croatia, and Queen Maria Theresa made significant contributions to Croatian affairs, such as introducing compulsory education.

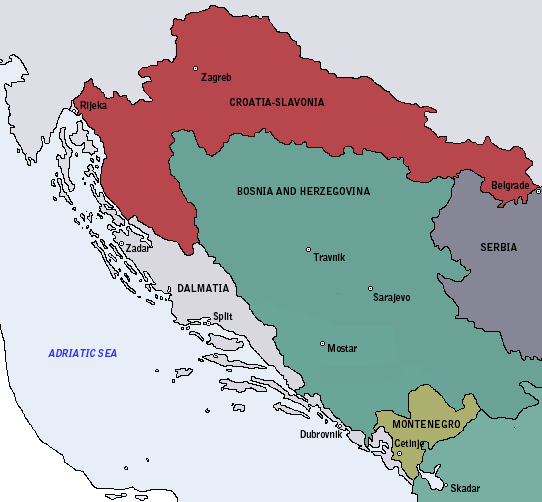
The Kingdom of Croatia-Slavonia was an autonomous kingdom within Austria-Hungary created in 1868 following the Croatian–Hungarian Settlement.

Between 1797 and 1809, the First French Empire increasingly occupied the eastern Adriatic coastline and its hinterland, ending the Venetian and the Ragusan republics, establishing the Illyrian Provinces. In response, the Royal Navy blockaded the Adriatic Sea, leading to the Battle of Vis in 1811. The Illyrian provinces were captured by the Austrians in 1813 and absorbed by the Austrian Empire following the Congress of Vienna in 1815. This led to the formation of the Kingdom of Dalmatia and the restoration of the Croatian Littoral to the Kingdom of Croatia under one crown. The 1830s and 1840s featured romantic nationalism that inspired the Croatian National Revival, a political and cultural campaign advocating the unity of South Slavs within the empire. Its primary focus was establishing a standard language as a counterweight to Hungarian while promoting Croatian literature and culture. During the Hungarian Revolution of 1848, Croatia sided with Austria. Ban Josip Jelačić helped defeat the Hungarians in 1849 and ushered in a Germanisation policy. This is around the time that Nikola Tesla was born in Smiljan.

By the 1860s, the failure of the policy became apparent, leading to the Austro-Hungarian Compromise of 1867. The creation of a personal union between the Austrian Empire and the Kingdom of Hungary followed. The treaty left Croatia's status to Hungary, which was resolved by the Croatian–Hungarian Settlement of 1868 when the kingdoms of Croatia and Slavonia were united. The Kingdom of Dalmatia remained under de facto Austrian control, while Rijeka retained the status of corpus separatum previously introduced in 1779. After Austria-Hungary occupied Bosnia and Herzegovina following the 1878 Treaty of Berlin, the Military Frontier was abolished. The Croatian and Slavonian sectors of the Frontier returned to Croatia in 1881, under provisions of the Croatian–Hungarian Settlement. Renewed efforts to reform Austria-Hungary, entailing federalisation with Croatia as a federal unit, were stopped by World War I.

=== The World Wars and Yugoslavia ===
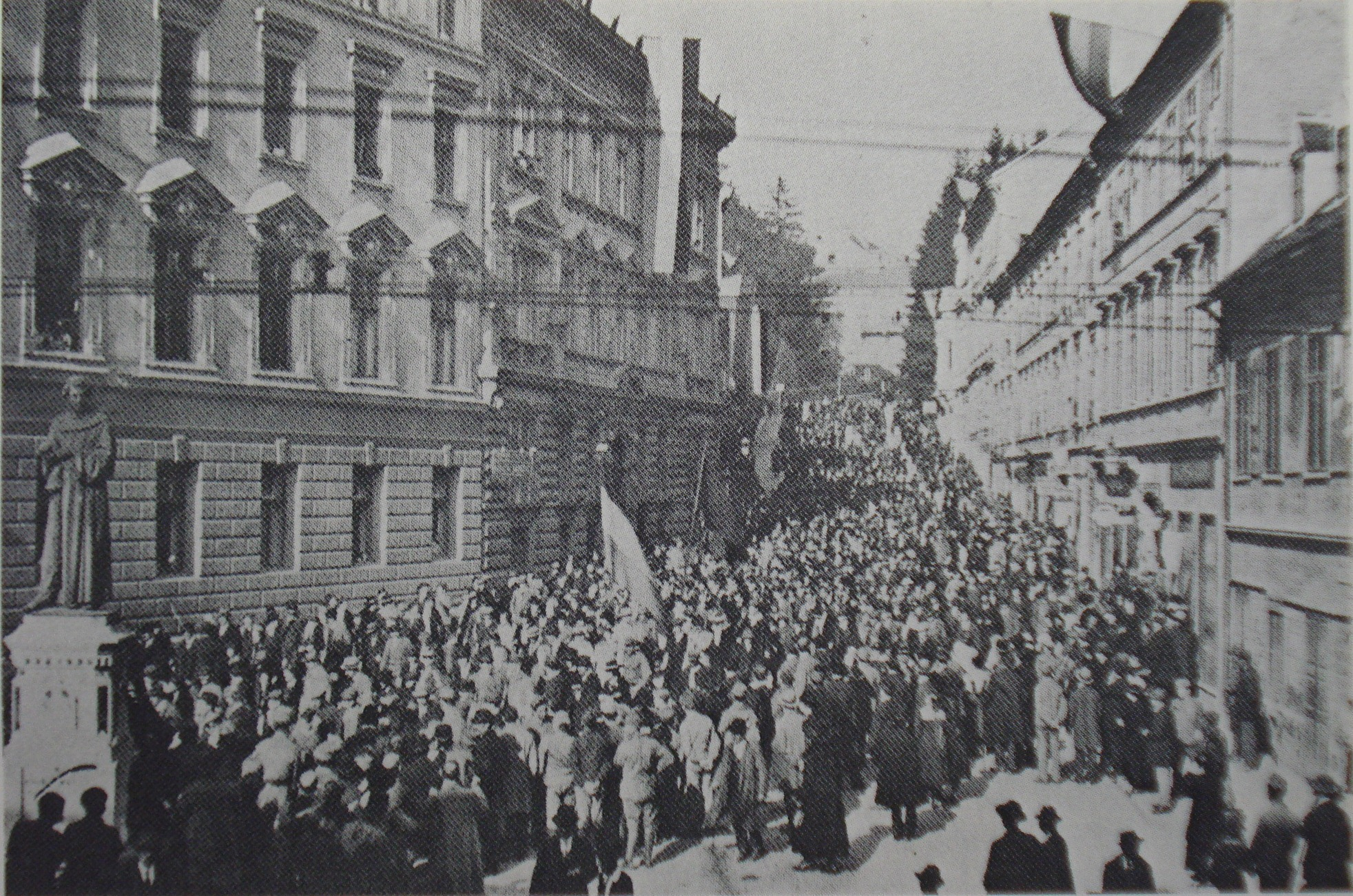
Mass protests in Zagreb against the unification of the State of Slovenes, Croats and Serbs with the Kingdom of Serbia in 1918

On 29 October 1918, the Croatian Parliament (Sabor) declared independence and decided to join the newly formed State of Slovenes, Croats, and Serbs, which in turn entered into union with the Kingdom of Serbia on 4 December 1918 to form the Kingdom of Serbs, Croats, and Slovenes. The Croatian Parliament never ratified the union with Serbia and Montenegro. The 1921 constitution defining the country as a unitary state and abolition of Croatian Parliament and historical administrative divisions effectively ended Croatian autonomy.

The new constitution was opposed by the most widely supported national political party—the Croatian Peasant Party (HSS) led by Stjepan Radić. The political situation deteriorated further as Radić was assassinated in the National Assembly by NRS member, Serbian nationalist politician Puniša Račić in 1928, culminating in King Alexander I's establishment of the 6 January Dictatorship in 1929. The dictatorship formally ended in 1931 when the king imposed a more unitary constitution. The HSS, now led by Vladko Maček, continued to advocate federalisation, resulting in the Cvetković–Maček Agreement of August 1939 and the autonomous Banovina of Croatia. The Yugoslav government retained control of defence, internal security, foreign affairs, trade, and transport while other matters were left to the Croatian Sabor and a crown-appointed Ban.

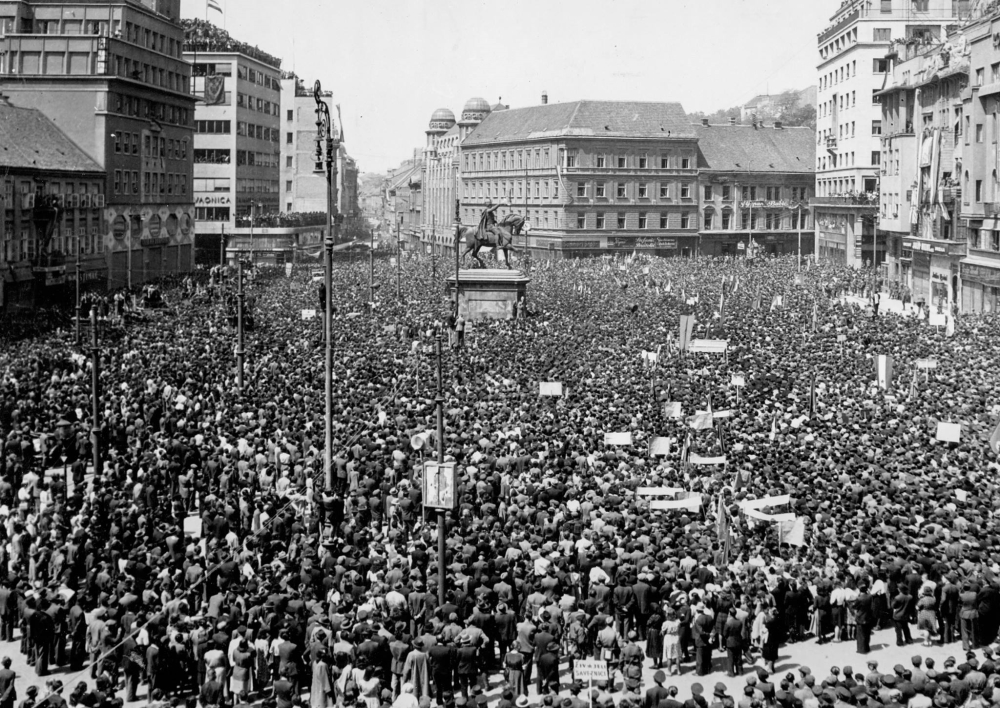
People of Zagreb celebrating liberation on 12 May 1945 by Croatian Partisans

In April 1941, Yugoslavia was invaded by Nazi Germany and Fascist Italy. Following the invasion, a German-Italian installed puppet state named the Independent State of Croatia (NDH) was established. Most of Croatia, Bosnia and Herzegovina, and the region of Syrmia were incorporated into this state. Parts of Dalmatia were annexed by Italy, Hungary annexed the northern Croatian regions of Baranja and Međimurje. The NDH regime was led by Ante Pavelić and the ultranationalist Ustaše, a fringe movement in pre-war Croatia. With German and Italian military and political support, the regime introduced racial laws and launched a genocide campaign against Serbs, Jews, and Roma. Many were imprisoned in concentration camps; the largest was the Jasenovac complex. Anti-fascist Croats were targeted by the regime as well. Several concentration camps (most notably the Rab, Gonars and Molat camps) were established in Italian-occupied territories, mostly for Slovenes and Croats. At the same time, the Yugoslav Royalist and Serbian nationalist Chetniks pursued a genocidal campaign against Croats and Muslims, aided by Italy. Nazi German forces committed crimes and reprisals against civilians in retaliation for Partisan actions, such as in the villages of Kamešnica and Lipa in 1944.

A resistance movement emerged. On 22 June 1941, the 1st Sisak Partisan Detachment was formed near Sisak, the first military unit formed by a resistance movement in occupied Europe. That sparked the beginning of the Yugoslav Partisan movement, a communist, multi-ethnic anti-fascist resistance group led by Josip Broz Tito. In ethnic terms, Croats were the second-largest contributors to the Partisan movement after Serbs. In per capita terms, Croats contributed proportionately to their population within Yugoslavia. By May 1944 (according to Tito), Croats made up 30% of the Partisan's ethnic composition, despite making up 22% of the population. The movement grew fast, and at the Tehran Conference in December 1943, the Partisans gained recognition from the Allies.

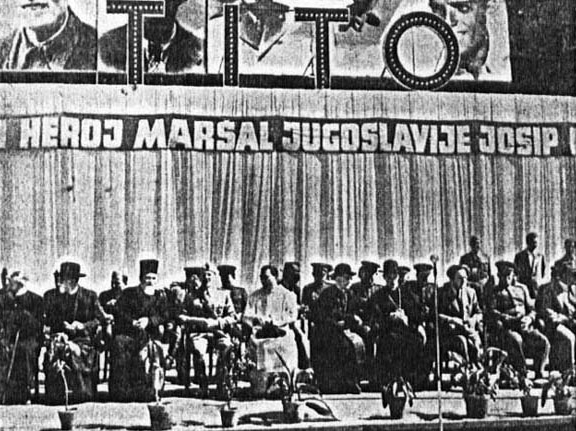
Cardinal Aloysius Stepinac with the Croatian communist leader Vladimir Bakarić at the celebration of May Day in 1945.

With Allied support in logistics, equipment, training and airpower, and with the assistance of Soviet troops taking part in the 1944 Belgrade Offensive, the Partisans gained control of Yugoslavia and the border regions of Italy and Austria by May 1945. Members of the NDH armed forces and other Axis troops, as well as civilians, were in retreat towards Austria. Following their surrender, many were killed in the Yugoslav death march of Nazi collaborators. In the following years, ethnic Germans faced persecution in Yugoslavia, and many were interned. The political aspirations of the Partisan movement were reflected in the State Anti-fascist Council for the National Liberation of Croatia, which developed in 1943 as the bearer of Croatian statehood and later transformed into the Parliament in 1945, and AVNOJ—its counterpart at the Yugoslav level.

Based on the studies on wartime and post-war casualties by demographer Vladimir Žerjavić and statistician Bogoljub Kočović, a total of 295,000 people from the territory (not including territories ceded from Italy after the war) died, which amounted to 7.3% of the population, among whom were 125–137,000 Serbs, 118–124,000 Croats, 16–17,000 Jews, and 15,000 Roma. In addition, from areas joined to Croatia after the war, a total of 32,000 people died, among whom 16,000 were Italians and 15,000 were Croats. Approximately 200,000 Croats from the entirety of Yugoslavia (including Croatia) and abroad were killed in total throughout the war and its immediate aftermath, approximately 5.4% of the population.

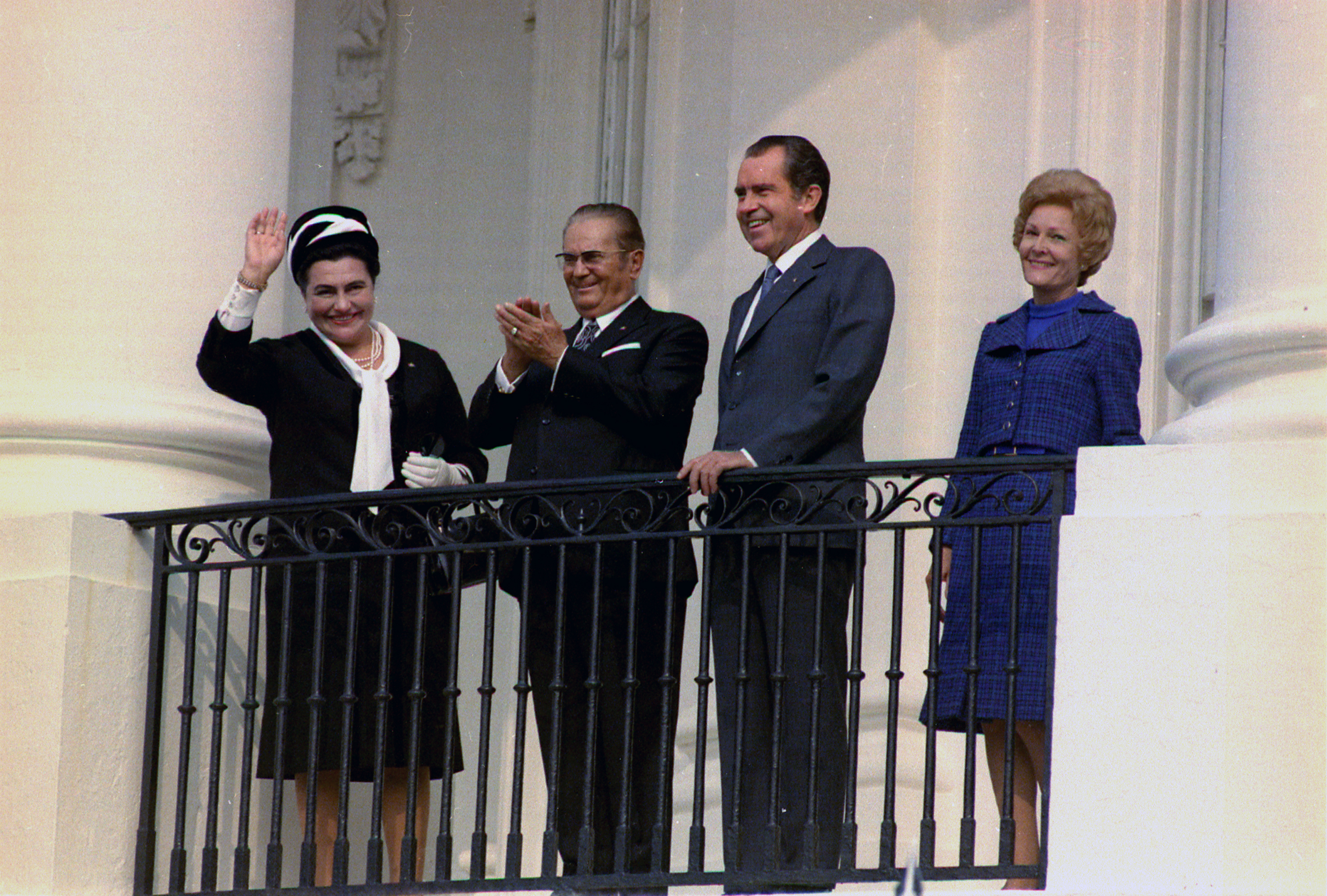
Josip Broz Tito led Yugoslavia from 1944 to 1980; Pictured: Tito with the US president Richard Nixon in the White House, 1971

After World War II, Croatia became a single-party socialist federal unit of the SFR Yugoslavia, ruled by the Communists, but having a degree of autonomy within the federation. In 1967, Croatian authors and linguists published a Declaration on the Status and Name of the Croatian Standard Language demanding equal treatment for their language. The declaration contributed to a national movement seeking greater civil rights and redistribution of the Yugoslav economy, culminating in the Croatian Spring of 1971, which was suppressed by Yugoslav leadership. Still, the 1974 Yugoslav Constitution gave increased autonomy to federal units, basically fulfilling a goal of the Croatian Spring and providing a legal basis for independence of the federative constituents. At the same time, there was a substantial Croatian diaspora during the Cold War, which included efforts aimed at forming a government in exile.

Following Tito's death in 1980, the political situation in Yugoslavia deteriorated. National tension was fanned by the 1986 SANU Memorandum and the 1989 coups in Vojvodina, Kosovo, and Montenegro. In January 1990, the Communist Party fragmented along national lines, with the Croatian faction demanding a looser federation. In the same year, the first multi-party elections were held in Croatia, while Franjo Tuđman's win exacerbated nationalist tensions. Some of the Serbs in Croatia left Sabor and declared autonomy of the unrecognised Republic of Serbian Krajina, intent on achieving independence from Croatia.

=== Independence ===
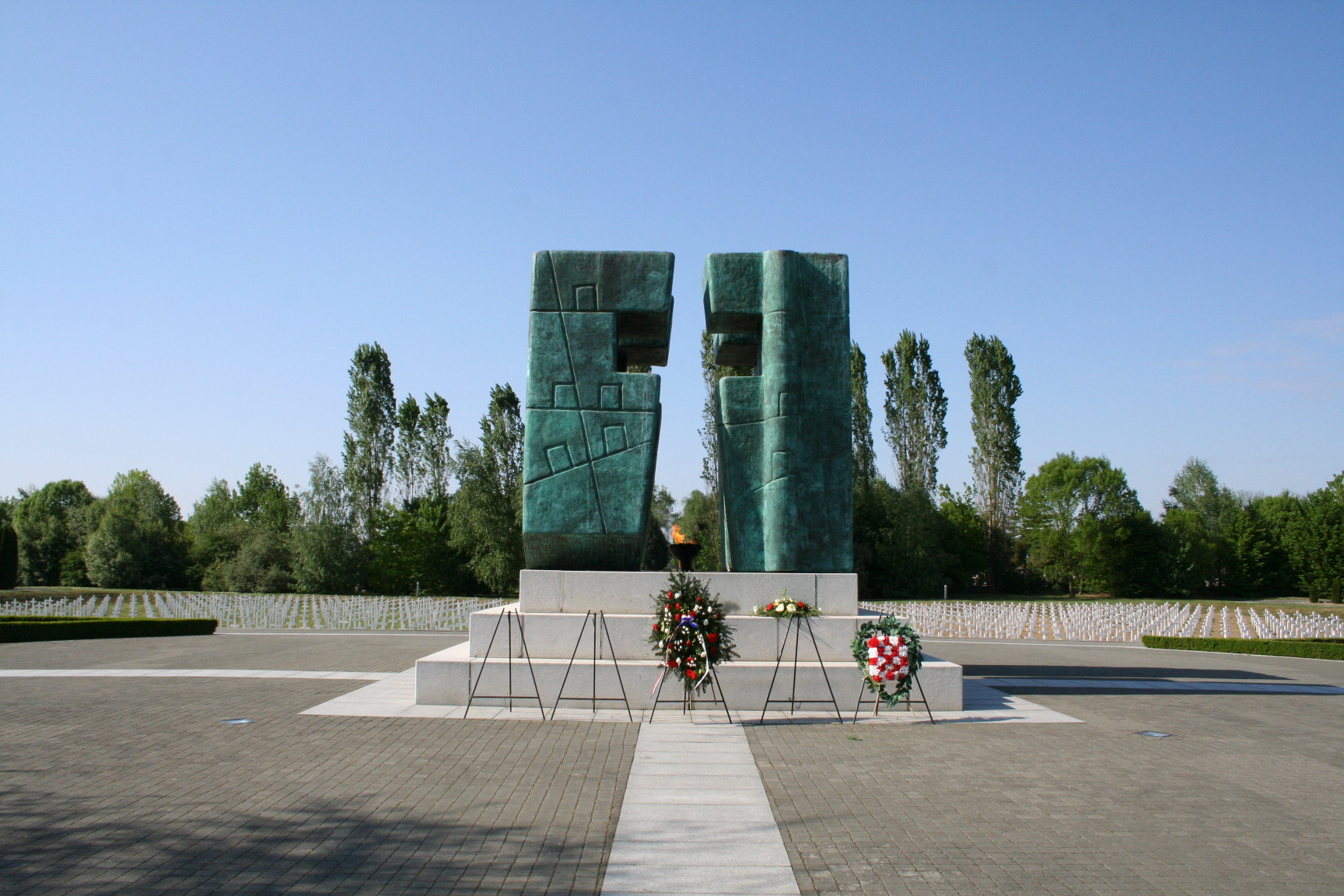
The Memorial Cemetery — the central site of the National Remembrance Day, commemorating all war victims and the Vukovar massacre in 1991

As tensions rose, Croatia declared independence on 25 June 1991. The full implementation of the declaration only came into effect after a three-month moratorium on the decision on 8 October 1991. In the meantime, tensions escalated into overt war when the Serbian-controlled Yugoslav People's Army (JNA) and various Serb paramilitary groups attacked Croatia. By the end of 1991, a high-intensity conflict fought along a wide front reduced Croatia's control to about two-thirds of its territory. Serb paramilitary groups then began a campaign of killing, terror, and expulsion of the Croats in the occupied territories, killing thousands of Croat civilians and expelling or displacing as many as 400,000–500,000 Croats and other non-Serbs from their homes. Serbs living in Croatian towns, especially those near the front lines, were subjected to various forms of discrimination. Croatian Serbs in Eastern and Western Slavonia and parts of the Krajina were forced to flee or were expelled by Croatian forces, though on a restricted scale and in lesser numbers. The Croatian Government publicly deplored these practices and sought to stop them, indicating that they were not a part of the Government's policy.

On 15 January 1992, Croatia gained diplomatic recognition by the European Economic Community, followed by the United Nations. The war effectively ended in August 1995 with a decisive victory by Croatia; the event is commemorated each year on 5 August as Victory and Homeland Thanksgiving Day and the Day of Croatian Defenders. Following the Croatian victory, about 200,000 Serbs from the self-proclaimed Republic of Serbian Krajina fled the region and hundreds of mainly elderly Serb civilians were killed in the aftermath of the military operation, often in revenge attacks, accompanied by looting, seizing or burning down of their property. Approximately half have returned since then. Some 19,000 Serb homes were subsequently settled by Croat refugees from Bosnia and Herzegovina. The remaining occupied areas were restored to Croatia following the Erdut Agreement of November 1995, concluding with the UNTAES mission in January 1998. Most sources number the war deaths at around 20,000.

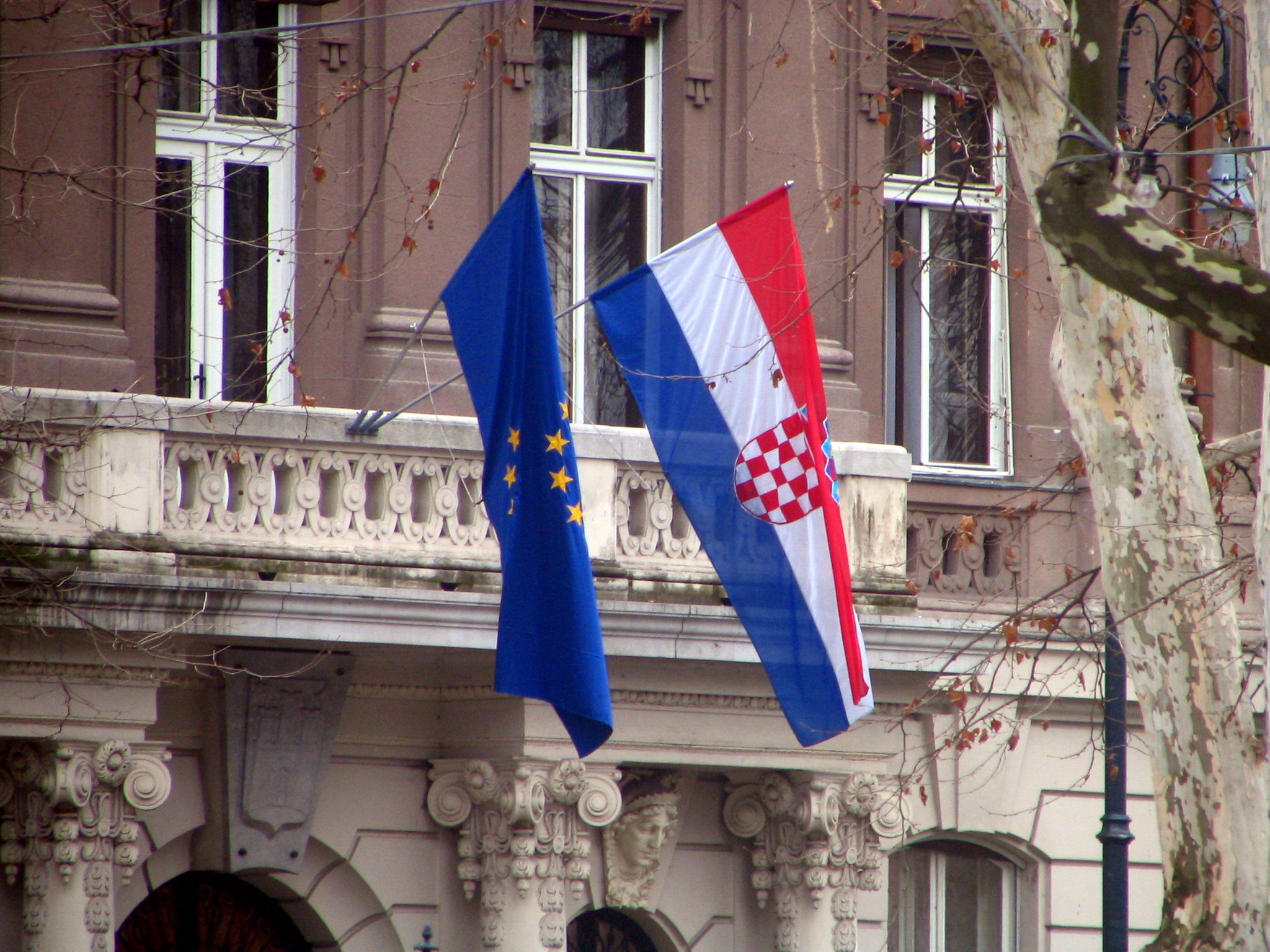
Croatia joined the EU in 2013 and the Eurozone a decade later in 2023.

At the turn of the 21st century, Croatia experienced sustained economic growth as the nation democratized but struggled with public corruption and bouts of unemployment. The Croatian Parliament passed a set of constitutional amendments in November 2000 and March 2001 to convert from a bicameral to a unicameral body, later limiting presidential powers. Croatia joined the Partnership for Peace in May 2000 and the World Trade Organization in November 2000. It joined the military alliance NATO in April 2009. Croatia was elected to serve on the non-permanent seat of the UN Security Council from 2008 to 2009. Adversely impacted by the 2008 financial crisis, austerity measures led to widespread anti-government protests in 2009 and 2011. In the latter year, parliament was dissolved in May, with Croatian president Ivo Josipović calling for new elections to quell the protests by December. After successfully completing negotiations from 2004 to 2013, Croatia joined the European Union (EU) as its 28th member in July 2013.

Croatia was affected by the 2015 European migrant crisis when Hungary's closure of borders with Serbia pushed over 700,000 refugees and migrants through Croatia. On 19 October 2016, Andrej Plenković began serving as the current Croatian Prime Minister. The most recent presidential elections, held on 12 January 2025, elected Zoran Milanović as president. In 2022, Croatia began the process to join the OECD, due to complete membership proceedings by 2026. The nation joined the Eurozone and Schengen Area in 2023, adopting the euro as its official currency.

== Geography ==
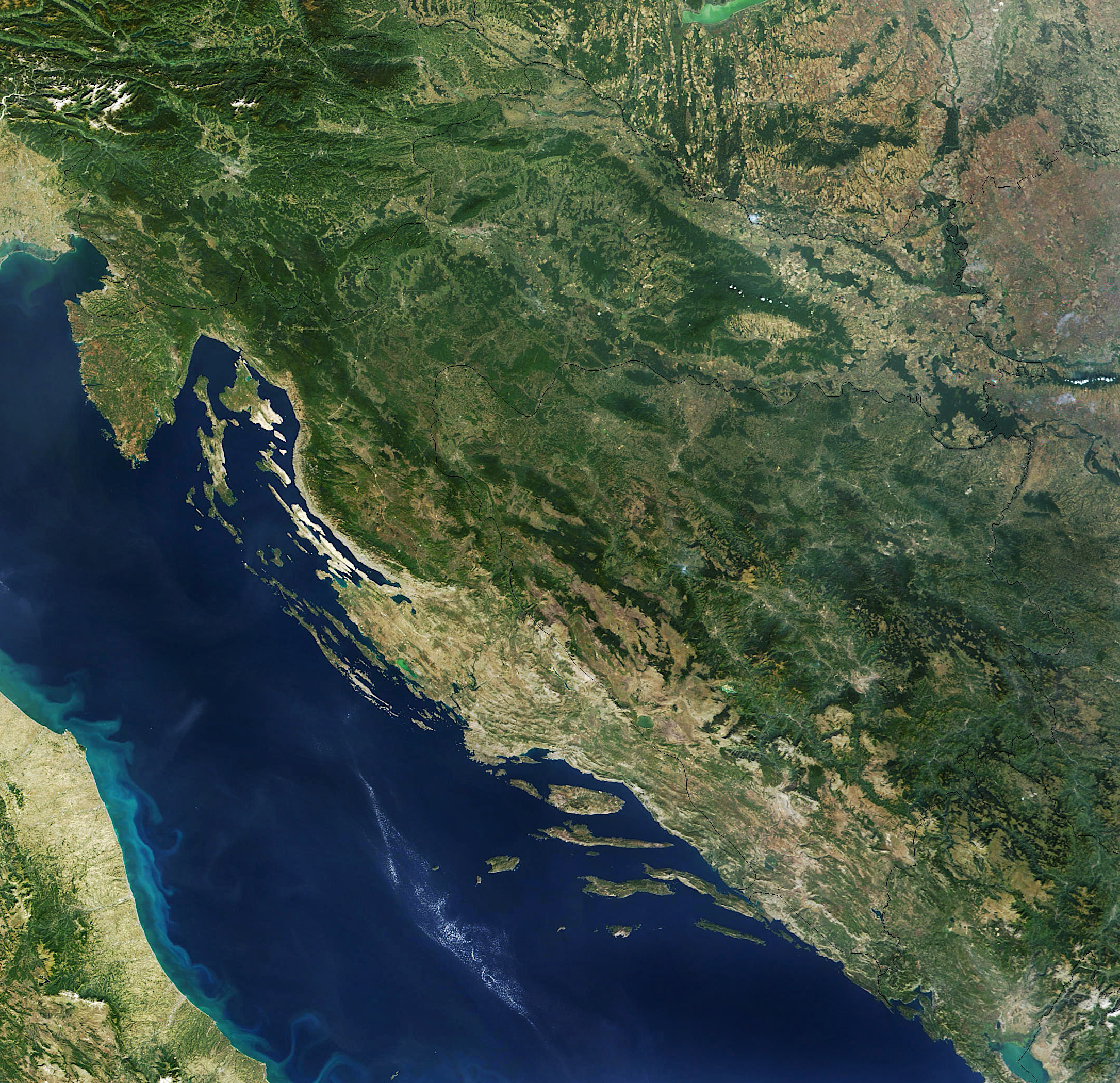
Satellite image of Croatia

Croatia is situated in Central and Southeast Europe, on the coast of the Adriatic Sea. Hungary is to the northeast, Serbia to the east, Bosnia and Herzegovina and Montenegro to the southeast and Slovenia to the northwest. It lies mostly between latitudes 42° and 47° N and longitudes 13° and 20° E. Part of the territory in the extreme south surrounding Dubrovnik is a practical exclave connected to the rest of the mainland by territorial waters, but separated on land by a short coastline strip belonging to Bosnia and Herzegovina around Neum. The Pelješac Bridge connects the exclave with mainland Croatia.

The territory covers 56,594 square kilometres (21,851 square miles), consisting of 56,414 square kilometres (21,782 square miles) of land and 128 square kilometres (49 square miles) of water. It is the world's 127th largest country. Elevation ranges from the mountains of the Dinaric Alps with the highest point of the Dinara peak at 1,831 metres (6,007 feet) near the border with Bosnia and Herzegovina in the south to the shore of the Adriatic Sea which makes up its entire southwest border. Insular Croatia consists of over a thousand islands and islets varying in size, 48 of which are permanently inhabited. The largest islands are Cres and Krk, each of them having an area of around 405 square kilometres (156 square miles). It is the largest overseas territory on the Adriatic Sea.

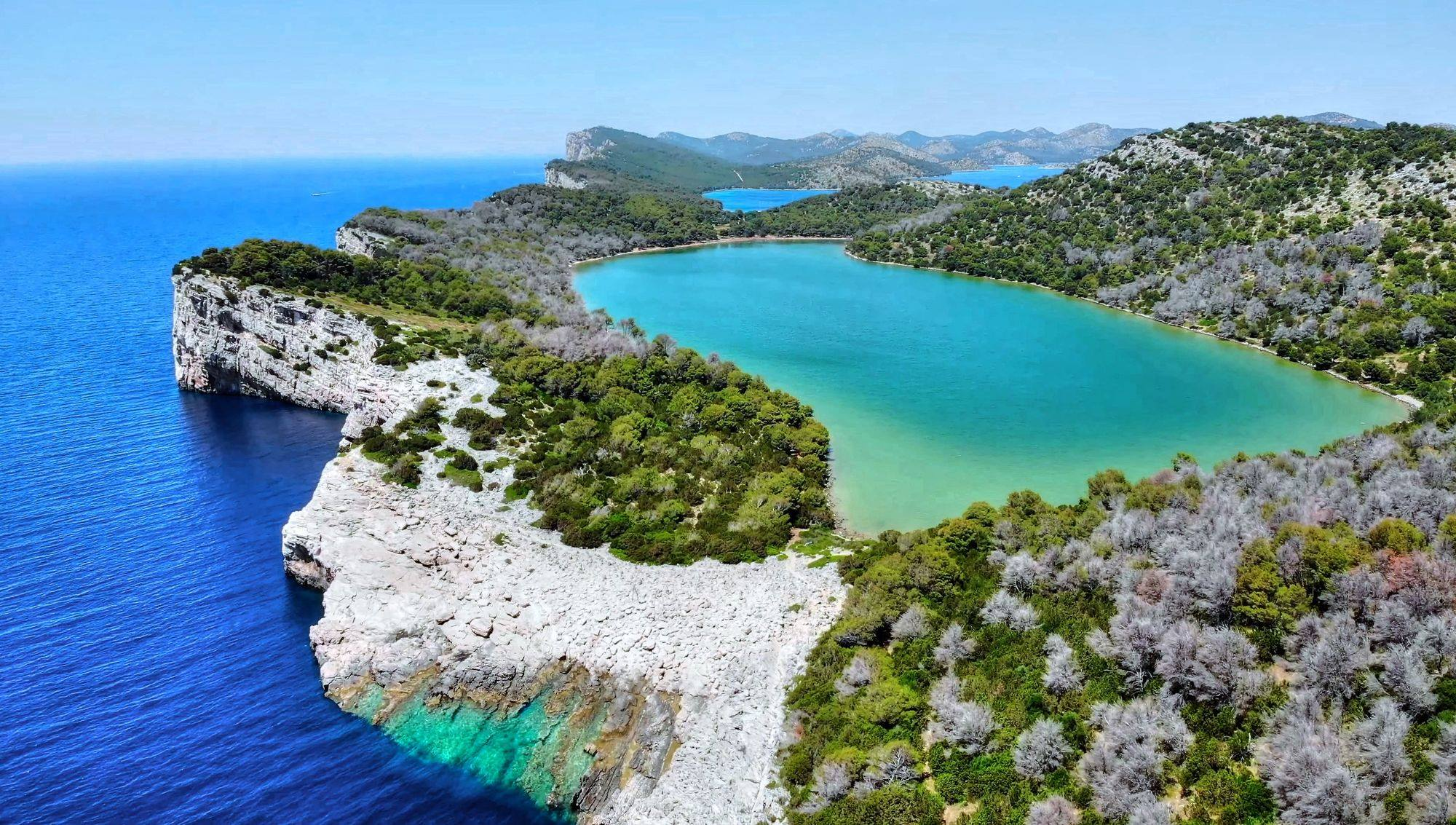
Telašćica Nature Park

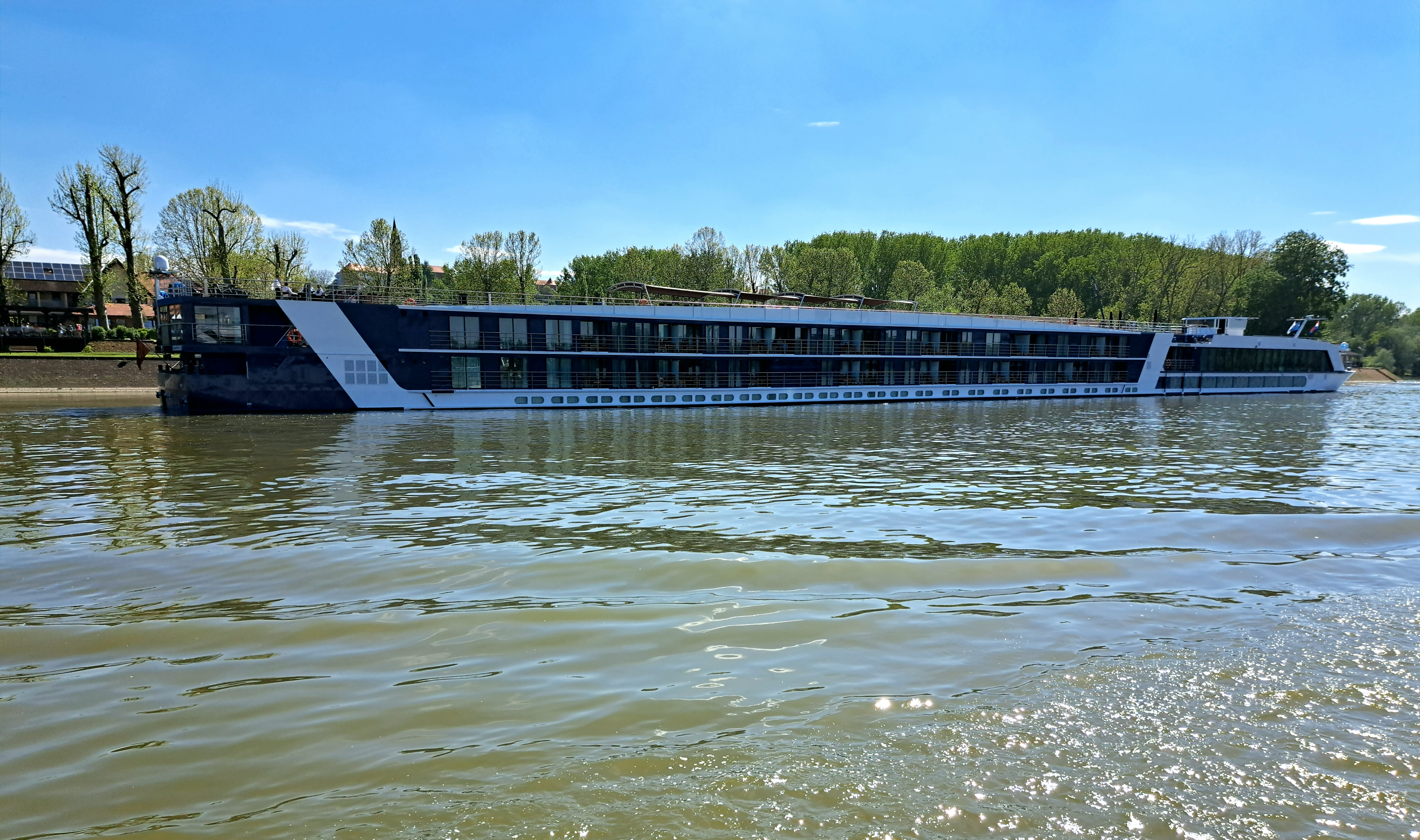
Tourist cruise on the Danube river, eastern Slavonia

The hilly northern parts of Hrvatsko Zagorje and the flat plains of Slavonia in the east which is part of the Pannonian Basin are traversed by major rivers such as Danube, Drava, Kupa, and the Sava. The Danube, Europe's second longest river, runs through the city of Vukovar in the extreme east and forms part of the border with Serbia. The central and southern regions near the Adriatic coastline and islands consist of low mountains and forested highlands. Natural resources found in quantities significant enough for production include oil, coal, bauxite, low-grade iron ore, calcium, gypsum, natural asphalt, silica, mica, clays, salt, and hydropower. Karst topography makes up about half of Croatia and is especially prominent in the Dinaric Alps. Croatia hosts deep caves, 49 of which are deeper than 250 m (820.21 ft), 14 deeper than 500 m (1,640.42 ft) and three deeper than 1,000 m (3,280.84 ft). The Plitvice lakes are a system of 16 lakes with waterfalls connecting them over dolomite and limestone cascades. The lakes are known for their distinctive colours, ranging from turquoise to mint green, grey or blue.

=== Climate ===
Köppen-Geiger climate classification map of Croatia

Most of Croatia has a moderately warm and rainy continental climate as defined by the Köppen climate classification. Mean monthly temperature ranges between −3 °C (27 °F) in January and 18 °C (64 °F) in July. The coldest parts of the country are Lika and Gorski Kotar featuring a snowy, forested climate at elevations above 1,200 metres (3,900 feet). The warmest areas are at the Adriatic coast and especially in its immediate hinterland characterised by Mediterranean climate, as the sea moderates temperature highs. Consequently, temperature peaks are more pronounced in continental areas.

The lowest temperature of −35.5 °C (−31.9 °F) was recorded on 3 February 1919 in Čakovec, and the highest temperature of 42.8 °C (109.0 °F) was recorded on 4 August 1981 in Ploče. Mean annual precipitation ranges between 600 millimetres (24 inches) and 3,500 millimetres (140 inches) depending on geographic region and climate type. The least precipitation is recorded in the outer islands (Biševo, Lastovo, Svetac, Vis) and the eastern parts of Slavonia. However, in the latter case, rain occurs mostly during the growing season. The maximum precipitation levels are observed in the Dinaric Alps, in the Gorski Kotar peaks of Risnjak and Snježnik.

Prevailing winds in the interior are light to moderate northeast or southwest, and in the coastal area, prevailing winds are determined by local features. Higher wind velocities are more often recorded in cooler months along the coast, generally as the cool northeasterly bura or less frequently as the warm southerly jugo. The sunniest parts are the outer islands, Hvar and Korčula, where more than 2700 hours of sunshine are recorded per year, followed by the middle and southern Adriatic Sea area in general, and northern Adriatic coast, all with more than 2,000 hours of sunshine per year.

=== Biodiversity ===
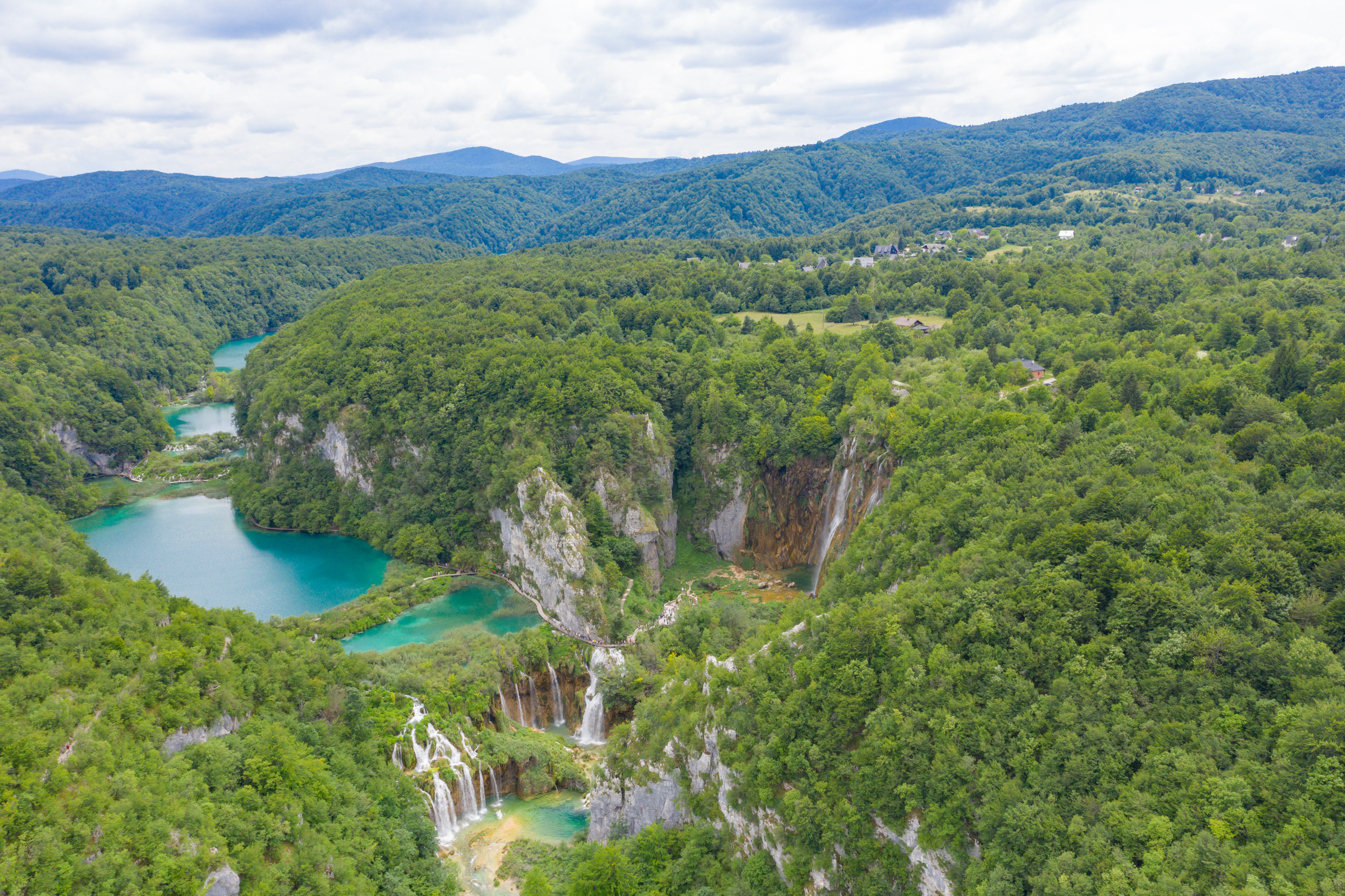
Plitvice Lakes National Park

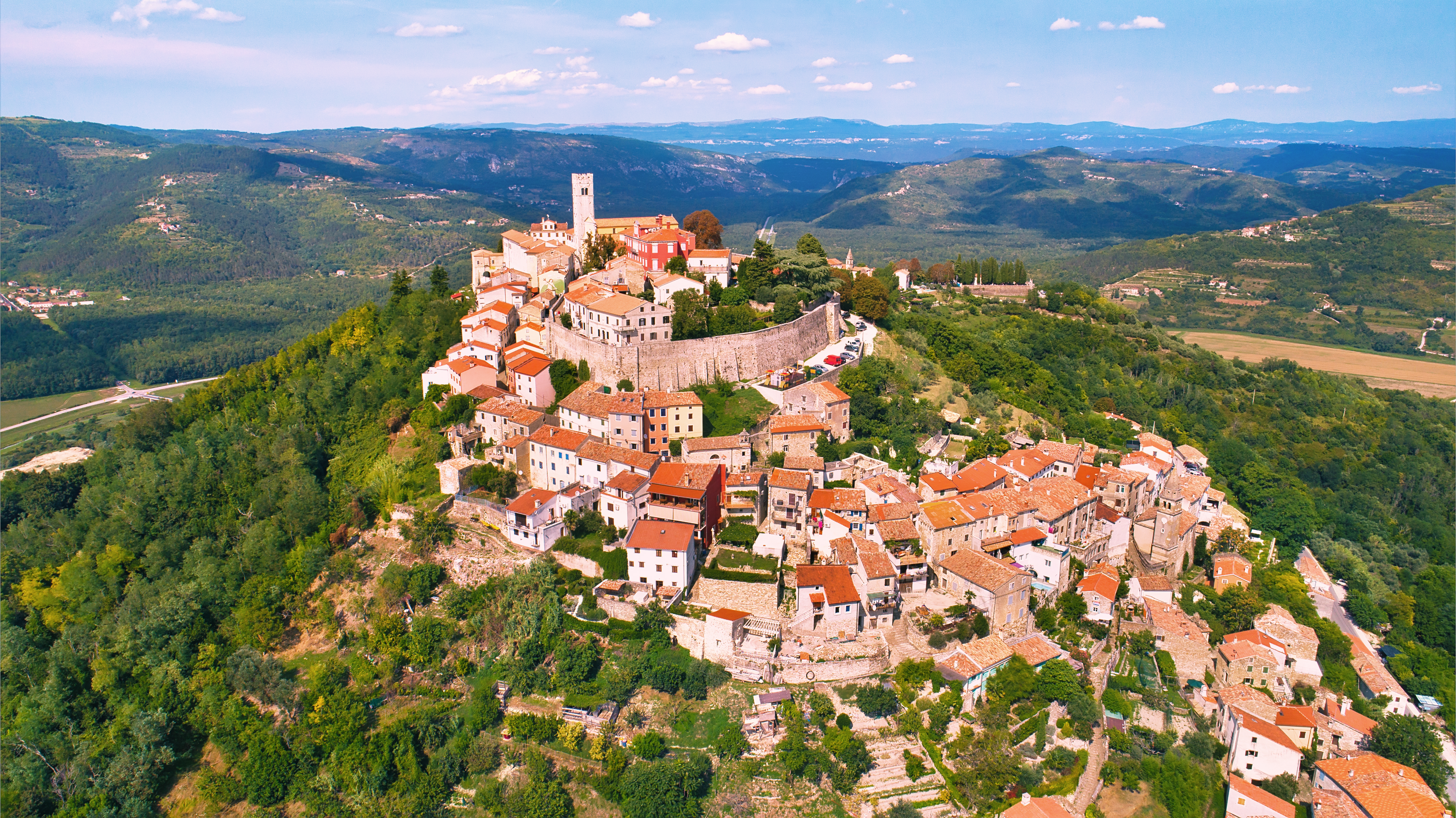
Landscapes of Motovun in Istrian peninsula

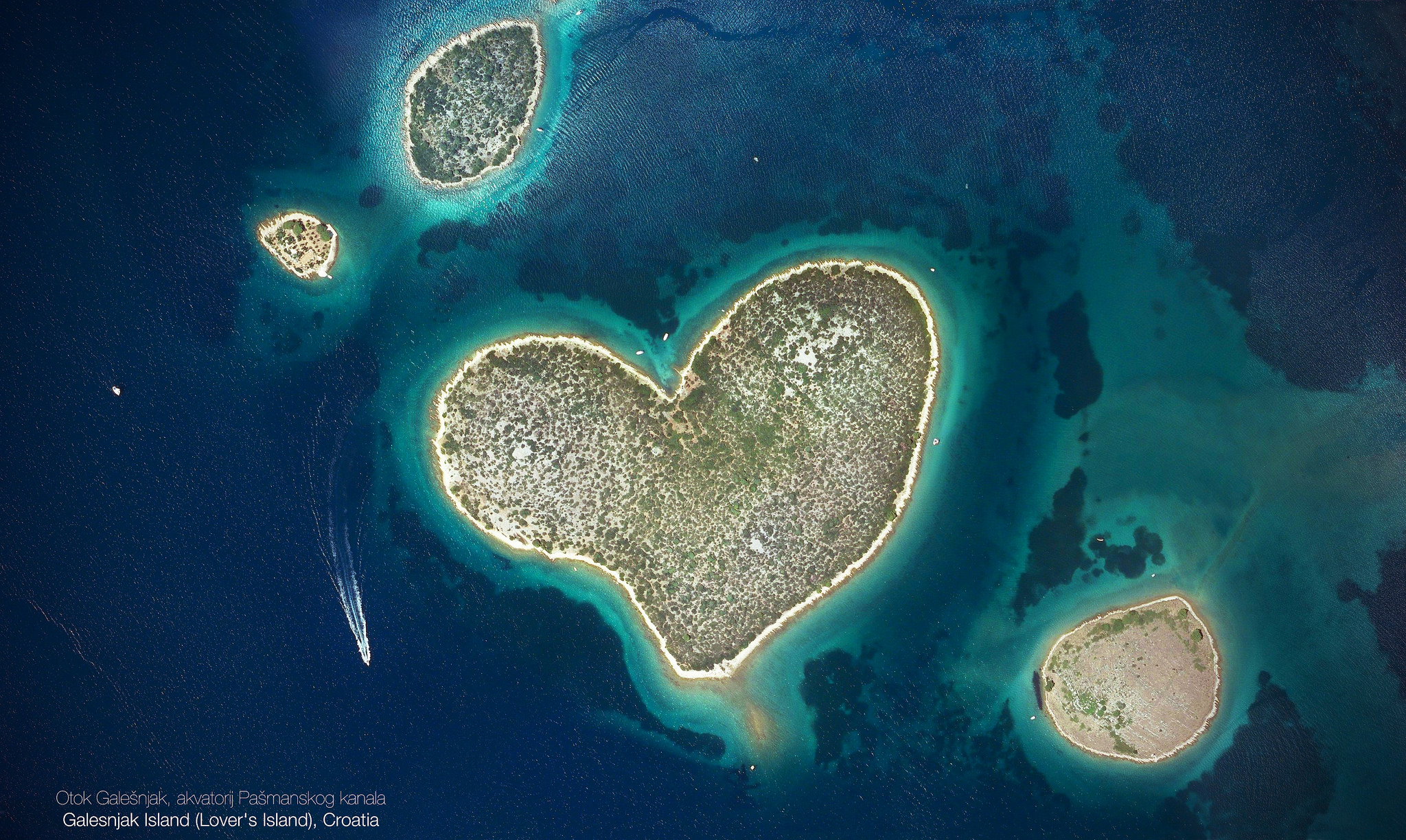
Galešnjak island in a shape of a heart

Croatia can be subdivided into ecoregions based on climate and geomorphology. The country is one of the richest in Europe in terms of biodiversity. Croatia has four types of biogeographical regions—the Mediterranean along the coast and in its immediate hinterland, Alpine in most of Lika and Gorski Kotar, Pannonian along Drava and Danube, and Continental in the remaining areas. The most significant are karst habitats which include submerged karst, such as Zrmanja and Krka canyons and tufa barriers, as well as underground habitats. The country contains three ecoregions: Dinaric Mountains mixed forests, Pannonian mixed forests, and Illyrian deciduous forests.

The karst geology harbours approximately 7,000 caves and pits, some of which are the habitat of the only known aquatic cave vertebrate—the olm. Forests are abundant, covering 2,490,000 hectares (6,200,000 acres) or 44% of Croatian land area. Other habitat types include wetlands, grasslands, bogs, fens, scrub habitats, coastal and marine habitats.

In terms of phytogeography, Croatia is a part of the Boreal Kingdom and is a part of Illyrian and Central European provinces of the Circumboreal Region and the Adriatic province of the Mediterranean Region. The World Wide Fund for Nature divides Croatia between three ecoregions—Pannonian mixed forests, Dinaric Mountains mixed forests and Illyrian deciduous forests.

Croatia hosts 37,000 known plant and animal species, but their actual number is estimated to be between 50,000 and 100,000. More than a thousand species are endemic, especially in Velebit and Biokovo mountains, Adriatic islands and karst rivers. Legislation protects 1,131 species. The most serious threat is habitat loss and degradation. A further problem is presented by invasive alien species, especially Caulerpa taxifolia algae.

Invasive algae are regularly monitored and removed to protect benthic habitat. Indigenous cultivated plant strains and domesticated animal breeds are numerous. They include five breeds of horses, five of cattle, eight of sheep, two of pigs, and one poultry. Indigenous breeds include nine that are endangered or critically endangered. Croatia has 411 protected areas, encompassing 9% of the country. Those include eight national parks, two strict reserves, and thirteen nature parks. The oldest national park in country is Plitvice Lakes National Park, a UNESCO World Heritage Site. Velebit Nature Park is a part of the UNESCO Man and the Biosphere Programme. The strict and special reserves, as well as the national and nature parks, are managed and protected by the central government, while other protected areas are managed by counties. In 2005, the National Ecological Network was set up, as the first step in the preparation of the EU accession and joining of the Natura 2000 network.

== Governance ==
Zoran Milanović
President

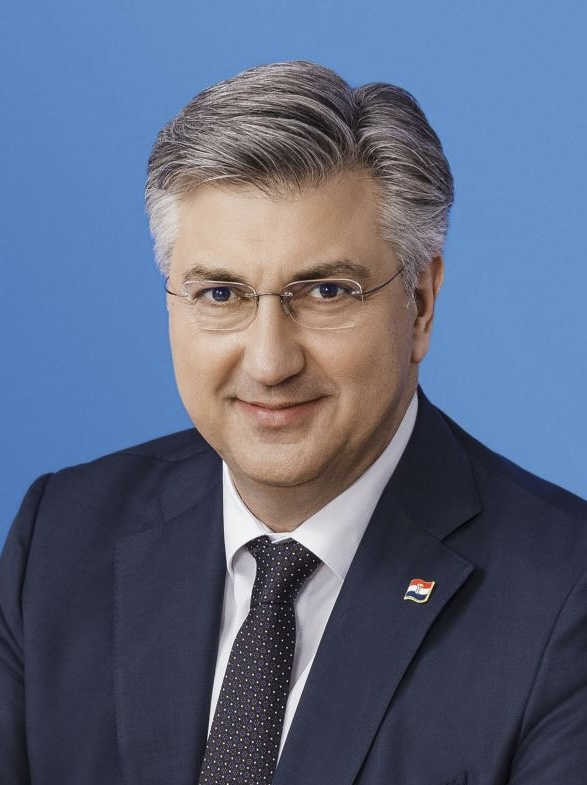
Andrej Plenković
Prime Minister

The Republic of Croatia is a unitary constitutional republic using a parliamentary system. Government powers in Croatia are legislative, executive, and judiciary powers. The president is the head of state, directly elected to a five-year term and is limited by the constitution to two terms. In addition to serving as commander-in-chief of the armed forces, the president has the procedural duty of appointing the prime minister with the parliament and has some influence on foreign policy.

The government is headed by the prime minister, who is supported by deputy prime ministers and various ministers in charge of particular sectors. As the executive branch, it is responsible for proposing legislation and a budget, enforcing the laws, and guiding foreign and internal policies. The government is seated at Banski dvori in Zagreb.

=== Law and judicial system ===
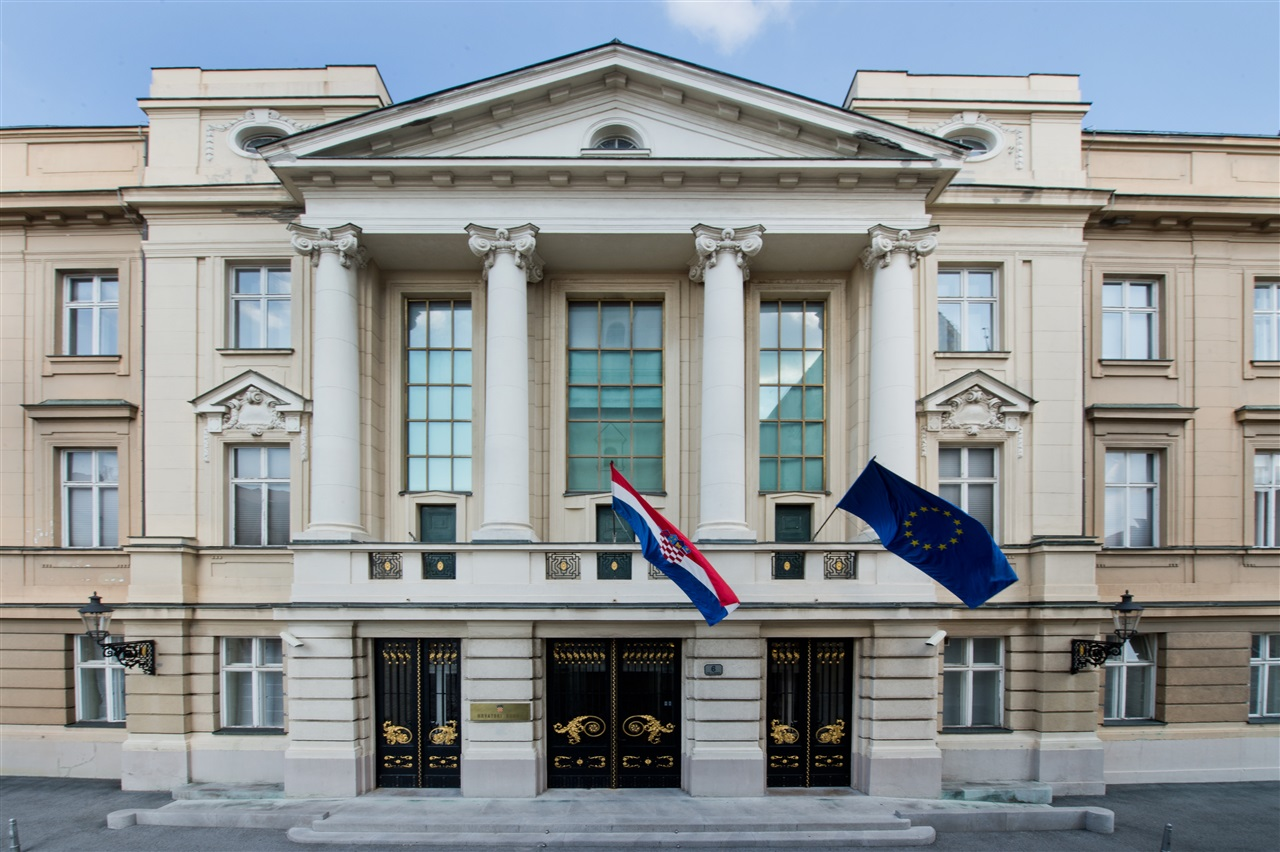
Croatian Parliament (Sabor) in Zagreb

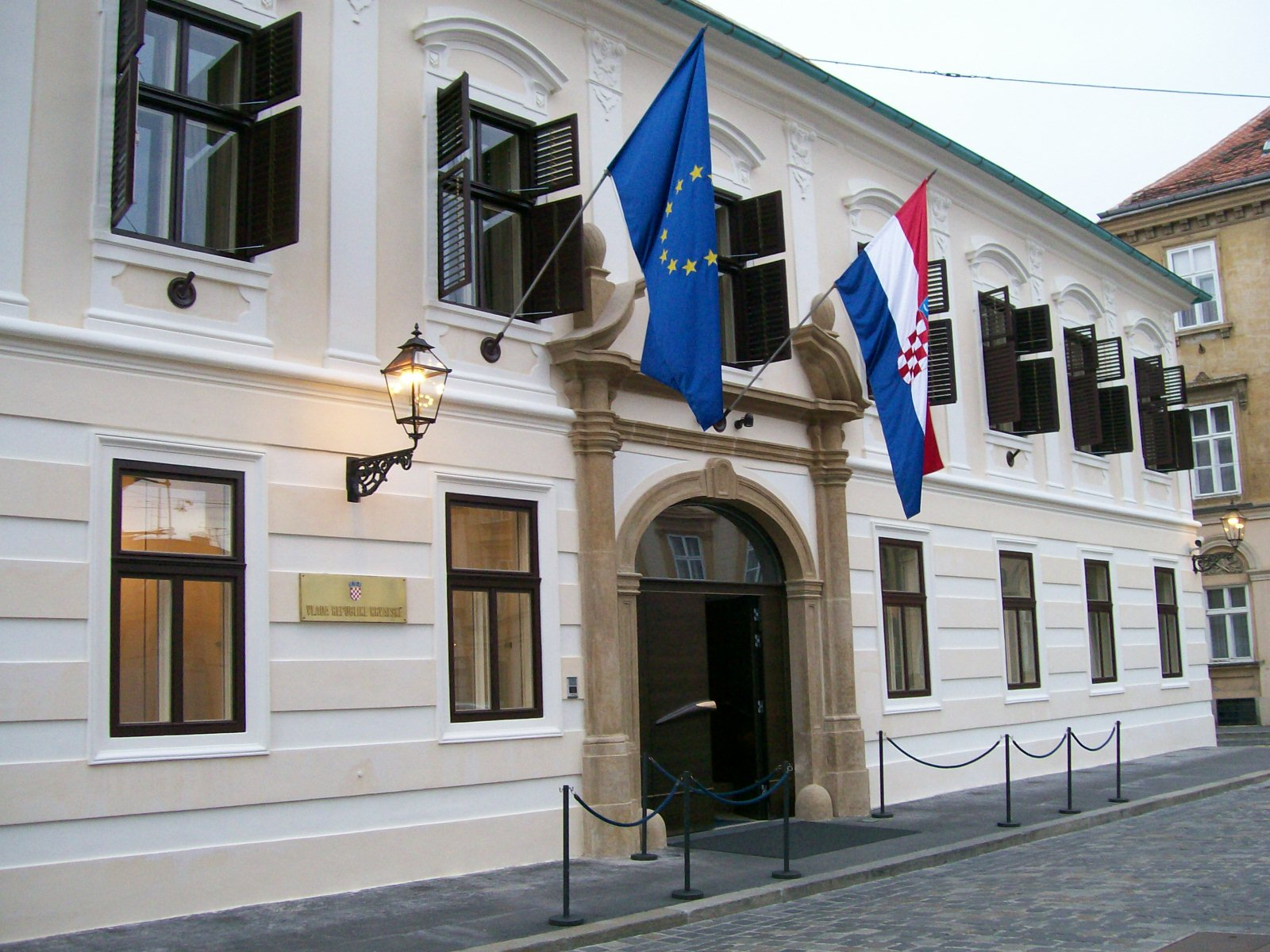
Banski dvori in Zagreb, seat of the Government of Croatia

A unicameral parliament – known as the Sabor – holds legislative power. The number of parliament members can vary from 100 to 160. They are elected by popular vote to serve four-year terms. Legislative sessions take place from 15 January to 15 July, and from 15 September to 15 December annually. The two largest political parties in Croatia are the Croatian Democratic Union (HDZ) and the Social Democratic Party of Croatia (SDP).

Croatia has a civil law legal system in which law arises primarily from written statutes, with judges serving as implementers and not creators of law. Its development was largely influenced by German and Austrian legal systems. Croatian law is divided into two principal areas—private and public law. Before EU accession negotiations were completed, Croatian legislation had been fully harmonised with the community acquis.

The main national courts are the Constitutional Court, which oversees violations of the Constitution, and the Supreme Court, which is the highest court of appeal. A variety of administrative, commercial, county, misdemeanor, and municipal courts handle cases in their respective domains. Cases falling within judicial jurisdiction are in the first instance decided by a single professional judge, while appeals are deliberated in mixed tribunals of professional judges. Lay magistrates also participate in trials. The State's Attorney Office is the judicial body constituted of public prosecutors empowered to instigate prosecution of perpetrators of offences. Law enforcement agencies are organised under the authority of the Ministry of the Interior which consist primarily of the national police force. Croatia's security service is the Security and Intelligence Agency (SOA).

=== Foreign relations ===
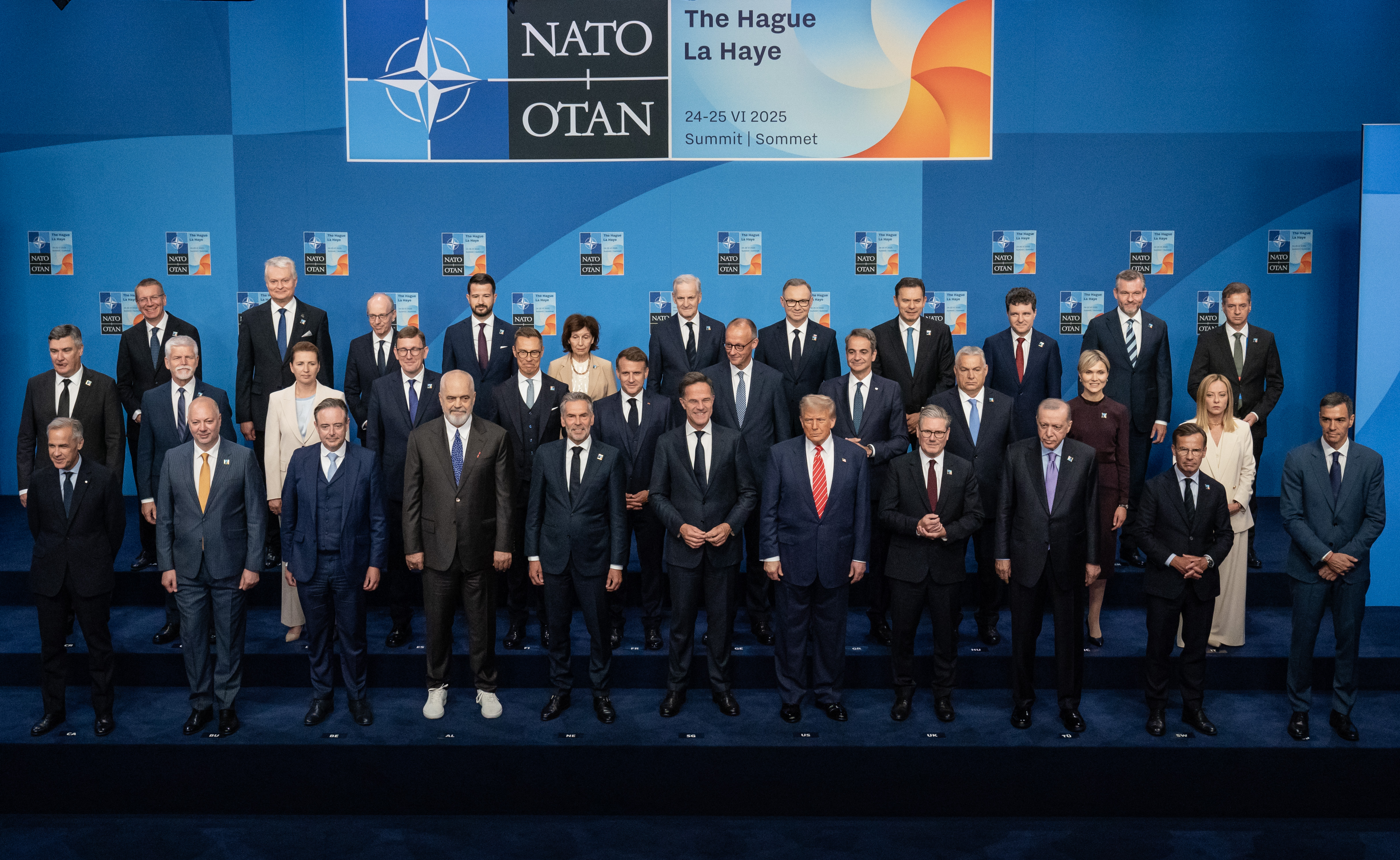
President Zoran Milanović with other Western leaders at the 2025 NATO Summit

Croatia has established diplomatic relations with most world nations – 189 states in total – starting with Germany (1991) and most recently with Liberia (2024). It exerts influence as a small power in this region and within European international institutions. Since the 1990s, Croatia has had unresolved border disputes throughout Southeast Europe, namely with Serbia, Bosnia and Herzegovina, Montenegro, and Slovenia. It is a member of the United Nations (UN), the European Union, NATO, the Council of Europe, the Union for the Mediterranean, and the Schengen Area as well as the Eurozone. Modern Croatian foreign policy objectives include enhancing relations with neighbouring countries, developing international cooperation and promotion of the Croatian economy.

It supports 57 embassies, 30 consulates and eight permanent diplomatic missions. Many international organisations have regional offices in Croatia, such as the European Bank for Reconstruction and Development (EBRD), International Organization for Migration (IOM), Organization for Security and Co-operation in Europe (OSCE), World Bank, World Health Organization (WHO), United Nations Development Programme (UNDP), United Nations High Commissioner for Refugees (UNHCR), and UNICEF.

=== Croatian diaspora ===
The diaspora consists of communities of ethnic Croats and Croatian citizens living outside Croatia. The largest diaspora is in the United States, with a large population across neighboring Southeast Europe. The country maintains extensive contact with Croatian communities abroad through administrative and financial support of cultural, sports activities, and economic initiatives. Croatia actively maintains foreign relations to strengthen and guarantee the rights of the Croatian minority abroad.

=== Military ===
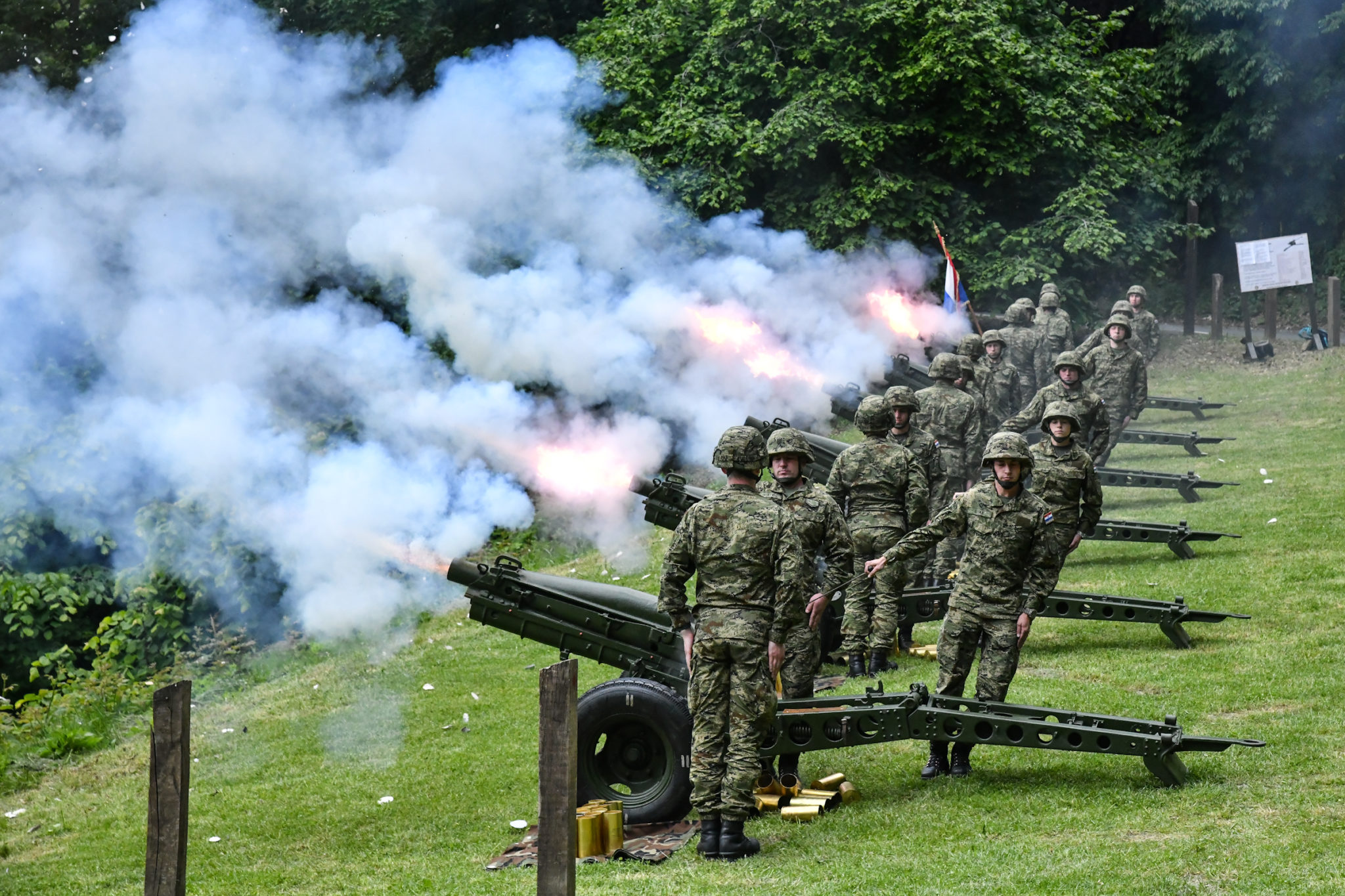
Croatian Army

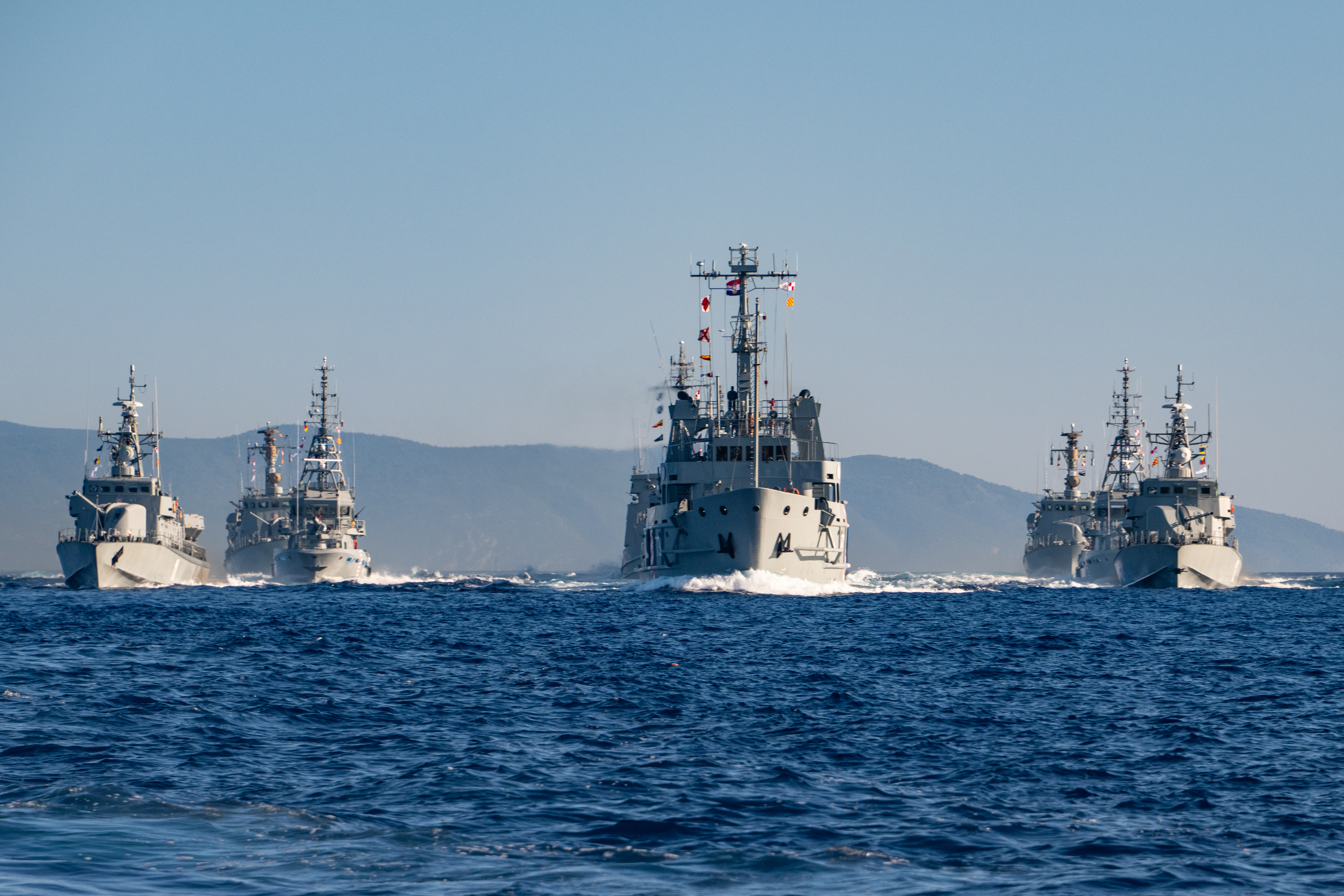
Croatian Navy

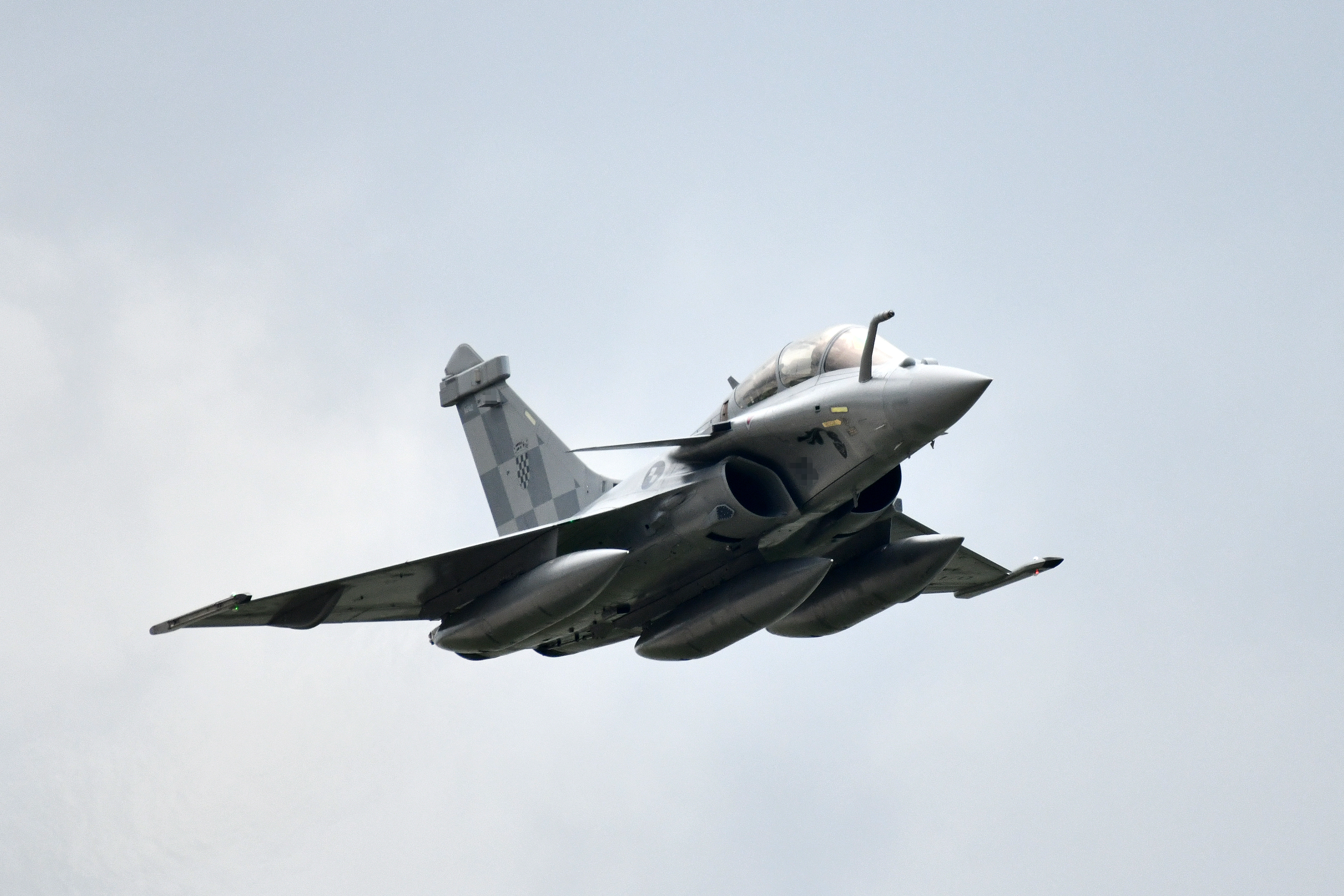
Croatian Air Force

The Armed Forces of Croatia (OSRH) consists of three service branches: the Croatian Army, the Croatian Navy and the Croatian Air Force. They are headed by the President of Croatia as commander-in-chief while defence policy is overseen by the Government of Croatia. The military supports the foreign policy of Croatia and international security initiatives. It is the sole military wing of the Military Security and Intelligence Agency (VSOA). The Armed Forces are spread across continental Croatia and capital city Zagreb, with the Navy largely based in Split. According to the 2025 Global Peace Index, Croatia is the 18th most peaceful country in the world.

Since the Croatian War of Independence (1991–1995), the Armed Forces have played a key role in protecting territorial integrity. The military's first foreign deployment was in 2003 – the War in Afghanistan and Iraq War – later joining the military alliance NATO in 2009. Croatia maintains a close security and foreign intelligence relationship with NATO and the United States. The military has been deployed to various United Nations (UN), NATO and American-led missions around the world. Since joining the European Union (EU) in 2013, it became a part of the EU defence forces.

The Armed Forces have seen significant militarization and modernization since the early 2020s due to regional geopolitical risk. Its deep integration within Europe and the U.S. has led to modern defence pacts and a robust defence industrial base. The Croatian military is among the most technologically advanced in Southeast Europe. Croatia has had military conscription since 2025, previously enacted from 1991 to 2008.

=== Administrative divisions ===
Counties of Croatia

Croatia was first divided into counties in the Middle Ages. The divisions changed over time to reflect losses of territory to Ottoman conquest and subsequent liberation of the same territory, changes of the political status of Dalmatia, Dubrovnik, and Istria. The traditional division of the country into counties was abolished in the 1920s when the Kingdom of Serbs, Croats and Slovenes and the subsequent Kingdom of Yugoslavia introduced oblasts and banovinas respectively.

Communist-ruled Croatia, as a constituent part of post-World War II Yugoslavia, abolished earlier divisions and introduced municipalities, subdividing Croatia into approximately one hundred municipalities. Counties were reintroduced in 1992 legislation, significantly altered in terms of territory relative to the pre-1920s subdivisions. In 1918, the Transleithanian part was divided into eight counties with their seats in Bjelovar, Gospić, Ogulin, Osijek, Požega, Varaždin, Vukovar, and Zagreb.

Since 1992, Croatia has been divided into 20 counties and the capital city of Zagreb, the latter having the dual authority and legal status of a county and a city. County borders changed in some instances, last revised in 2006. The counties subdivide into 127 cities and 429 municipalities. Nomenclature of Territorial Units for Statistics (NUTS) division is performed in several tiers. NUTS 1 level considers the entire country in a single unit; three NUTS 2 regions come below that. Those are Northwest Croatia, Central and Eastern (Pannonian) Croatia, and Adriatic Croatia. The latter encompasses the counties along the Adriatic coast. Northwest Croatia includes Koprivnica-Križevci, Krapina-Zagorje, Međimurje, Varaždin, the city of Zagreb, and Zagreb counties and the Central and Eastern (Pannonian) Croatia includes the remaining areas—Bjelovar-Bilogora, Brod-Posavina, Karlovac, Osijek-Baranja, Požega-Slavonia, Sisak-Moslavina, Virovitica-Podravina, and Vukovar-Syrmia counties. Individual counties and the city of Zagreb also represent NUTS 3 level subdivision units in Croatia. The NUTS local administrative unit (LAU) divisions are two-tiered. LAU 1 divisions match the counties and the city of Zagreb in effect making those the same as NUTS 3 units, while LAU 2 subdivisions correspond to cities and municipalities.

== Economy ==
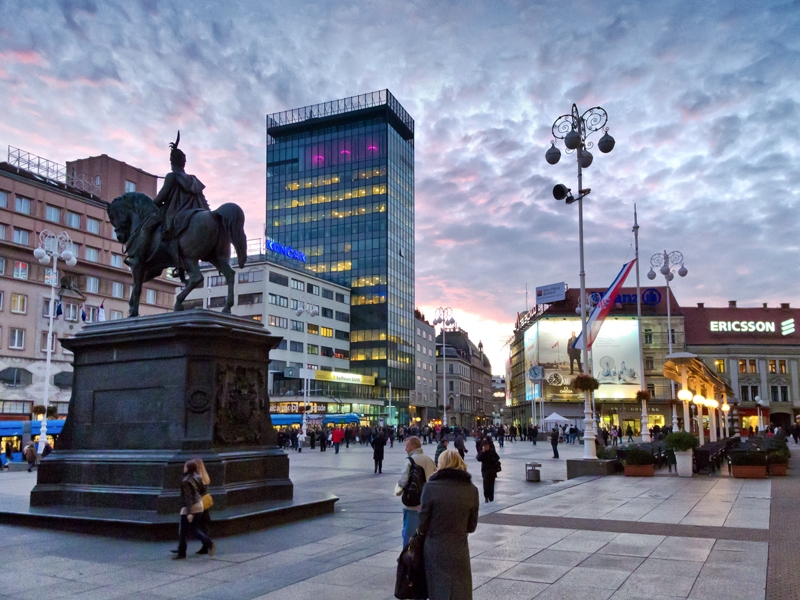
The capital city of Zagreb is the nation's primary economic and financial centre.

Croatia has a highly developed mixed economy. It is one of the largest economies in Southeast Europe by nominal gross domestic product (GDP). It maintains a similarly high regional GDP-per-capita. It is an open economy with accommodative foreign policy, highly dependent on international trade in Europe. Within Croatia, economic development varies among its counties, with strongest growth in Central Croatia and its financial centre, Zagreb. It has a very high level of human development, low levels of income inequality, and a high quality of life. Croatia's labor market has been perennially inefficient, with an underdeveloped investment climate and an ineffective corporate and income tax system.

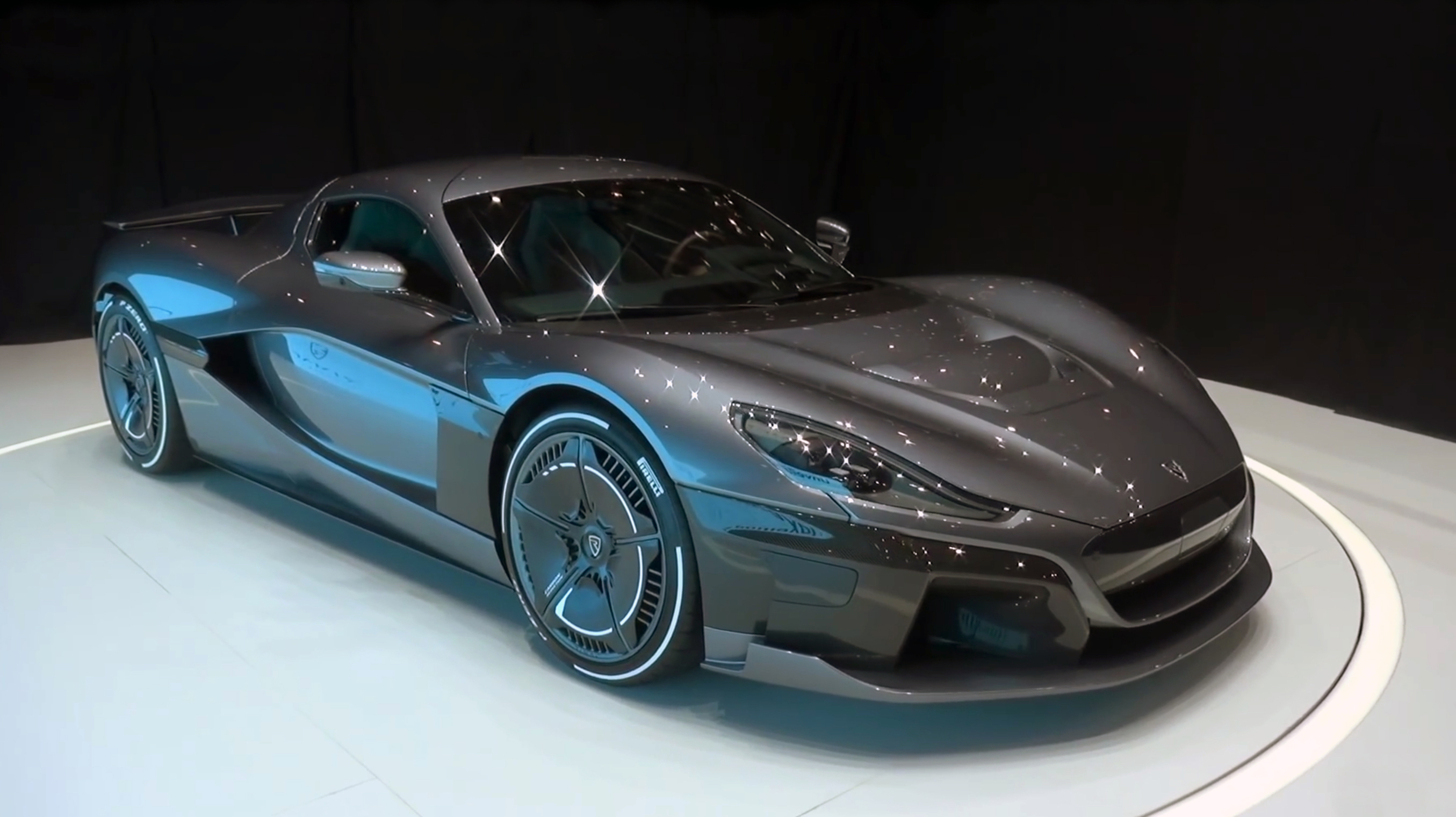
Rimac Automobili, one of Croatia's major automotive manufacturers.

Croatia's economic history is closely linked to its historic nation-building efforts. Its pre-industrial economy leveraged the country's geography and natural resources to guide agricultural growth. The 1800s saw a shipbuilding boom, railroading, and widespread industrialization. During the 1900s, Croatia entered into a planned economy (with socialism) in 1941 and a command economy (with communism) during World War II. It experienced rapid urbanization in the 1950s and decentralized in 1965, diversifying its economy before the independence of Croatia in 1990. The Croatian War of Independence (1991–95) curbed 21–25% of wartime GDP, leaving behind a developing transition economy.

The modern Croatian economy is considered high-income, dominated by its tertiary service and industry sectors which account for 70% of GDP. Croatia is an emerging energy power in Europe, with strategic investments in liquefied natural gas (LNG), geothermal networks, and electric transport. It supports regional economic activity via transportation networks along the Adriatic Sea and throughout Pan-European corridors. Croatia has free-trade agreements with many world nations and is a part of the World Trade Organization (2000) and the EEA (2013). Croatia's largest trading partner was the rest of the European Union, led by Germany, Italy, and Slovenia. The nation has an emerging defence sector, with major manufacturers including HS Produkt and Đuro Đaković, among others.

=== Tourism ===
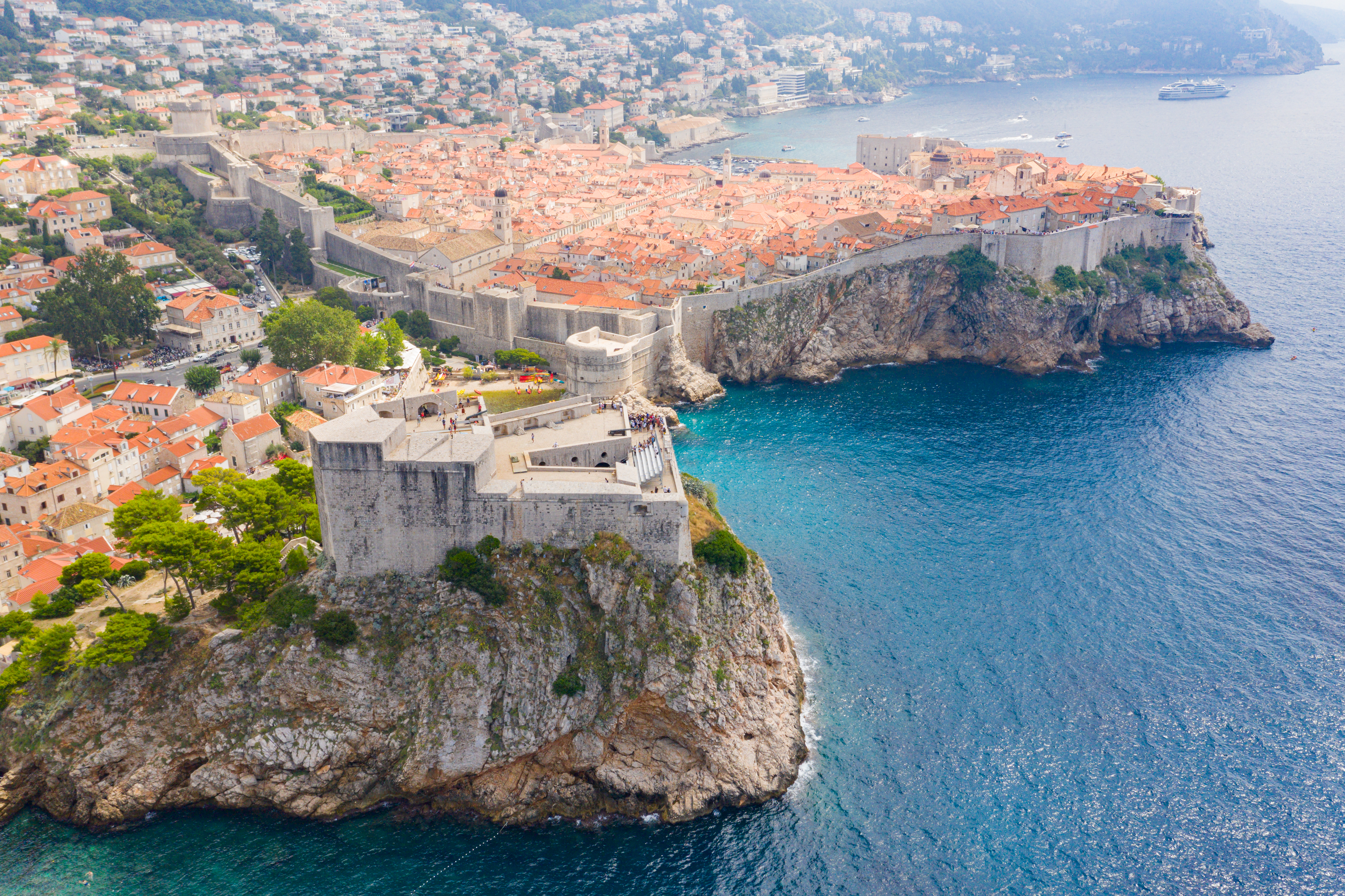
Dubrovnik is Croatia's most visited and most popular destination.

Tourism is a major industry and economic sector. It has historically represented a large component the country's economic output (GDP), routinely reaching 10% to 15% of total GDP. Croatia is deeply integrated with the European Union (EU), contributing to overall international tourism in Southeast Europe. Tourism is concentrated along the Adriatic coast and is strongly seasonal, peaking in July and August. The most frequented cities are Dubrovnik, Rovinj, Zagreb, Split, Poreč, Umag, and Zadar, respectively.

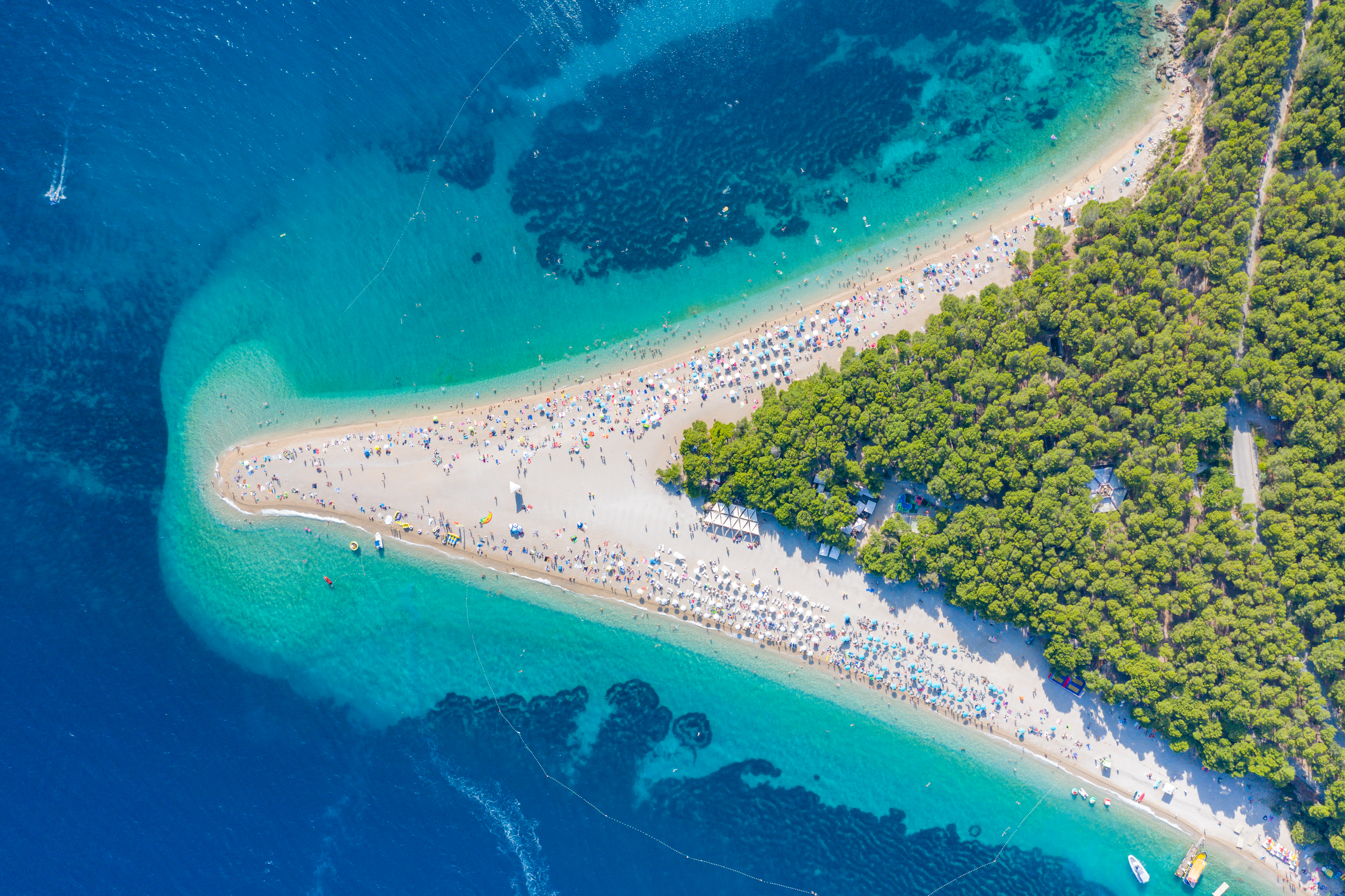
Zlatni Rat beach on the Island of Brač

The history of tourism in Croatia dates back to its time as part of Austria-Hungary when wealthy aristocrats would converge to the sea. Tourism expanded throughout the 1960s to the 1980s before the independence of Croatia in 1990 curbed tourism until the late-1990s. The 2000s saw a significant resurgence of Croatian tourism as it underwent nation-building with a particular emphasis on tourism revenue. By the late-2000s, Croatia became one of the most visited tourist destinations in the Mediterranean. A total of 20.2 million tourists visited Croatia in 2024.

Eight areas in the country have been designated national parks and thirteen as nature parks. There are ten World Heritage Sites and 111 Blue Flag beaches across the country. Factors of tourist interest are mainly culture, cuisine, history, fashion, architecture, art, religious sites and routes, nature, maritime access, and nightlife. Tourism has been partially supported by the Croatian film and television industries due to on-location filming. Inflation and overtourism has led to increased travel regulations and tourist costs since 2024. Eurostat estimated that nearly 55% of EU tourist accommodation is between Croatia (117,000) and neighboring Italy (230,000). In 2025, Croatia was the ninth-most-visited state in the EU and third-most-visited in Southern Europe.

=== Infrastructure ===
==== Motorways ====
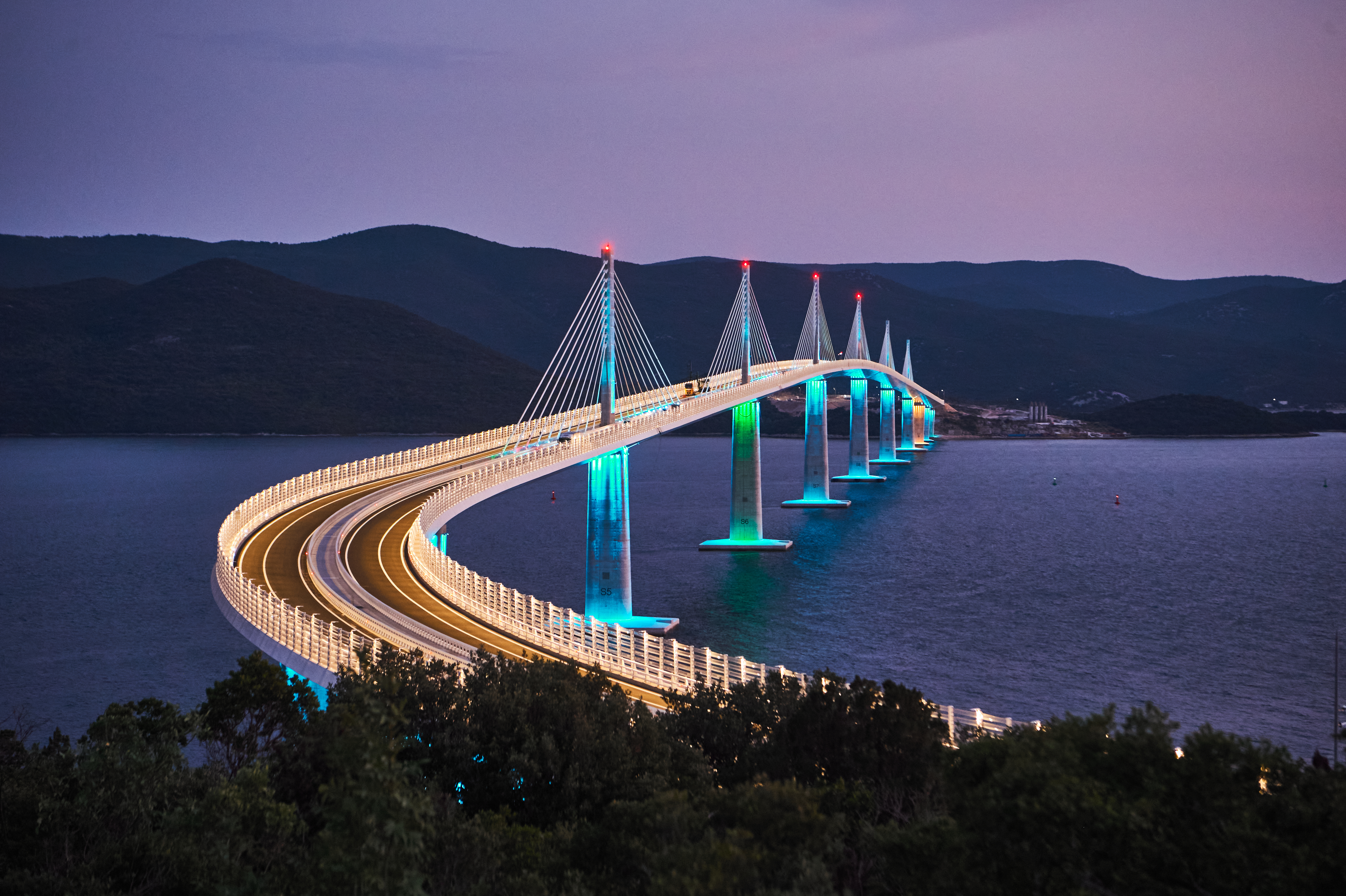
Pelješac Bridge connects the peninsula of Pelješac and through it the southernmost part, including Dubrovnik, with the Croatian mainland.

The motorway network was largely built in the late 1990s and the 2000s. As of December 2020, Croatia had completed 1,313.8 kilometres (816.4 miles) of motorways, connecting Zagreb to other regions and following various European routes and four Pan-European corridors. The busiest motorways are the A1, connecting Zagreb to Split and the A3, passing east to west through northwest Croatia and Slavonia.

A widespread network of state roads in Croatia acts as motorway feeder roads while connecting major settlements. The high quality and safety levels of the Croatian motorway network were tested and confirmed by EuroTAP and EuroTest programmes.

The construction of the 2.4-kilometre-long Pelješac Bridge connected the two-halves of Dubrovnik-Neretva County and shortened the route to the Pelješac peninsula and the islands of Korčula and Lastovo by more than 32 km. The construction of the bridge started in July 2018 after Croatian road operator Hrvatske ceste (HC) signed a 2.08 billion kuna deal for the works with a Chinese consortium led by China Road and Bridge Corporation (CRBC). The project was co-financed by the European Union with €357 million. The bridge was finished in July 2022, opening that same month.

==== Railways ====
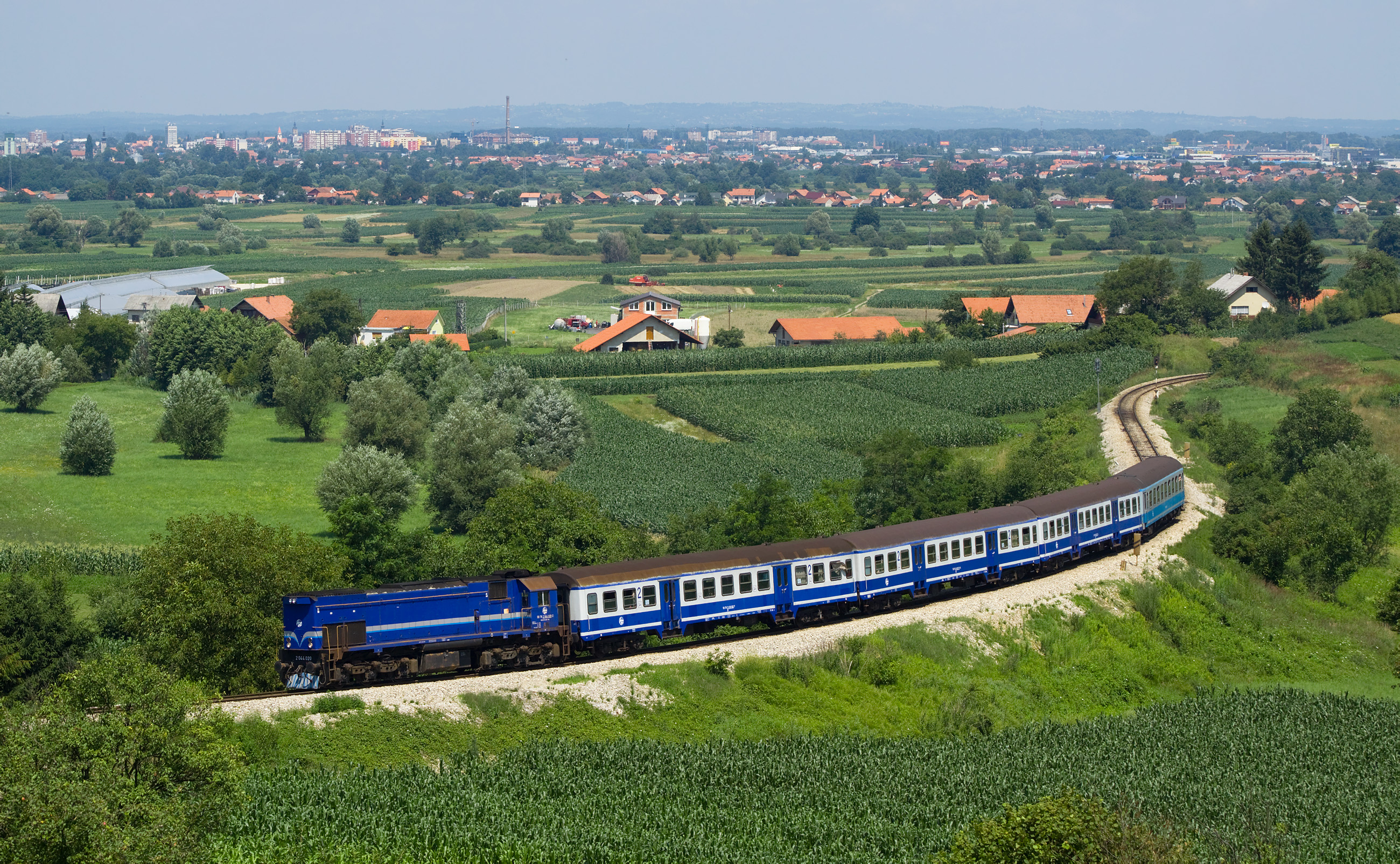
Local train to between Zagreb and Varaždin

HŽ series 6112 manufactured by the Croatian company Končar Group

Zagreb Airport, busiest in the country

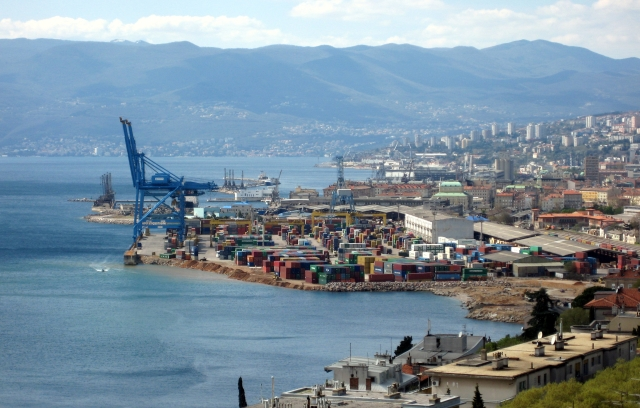
Rijeka Port

Croatia has an extensive rail network spanning 2,604 kilometres (1,618 miles), including 984 kilometres (611 miles) of electrified railways and 254 kilometres (158 miles) of double track railways. The most significant railways in Croatia are within the Pan-European transport corridors Vb and X connecting Rijeka to Budapest and Ljubljana to Belgrade, both via Zagreb. In 2024, the European Investment Bank committed €400 million to support the revitalization of the railway system, focusing on green and digital transformations. In July 2024, a significant agreement was signed for the acquisition of six electro-diesel multiple units (EDMUs) to improve connectivity between Split and Zagreb. Valued at €57.3 million and financed through an EIB loan, this project is part of the broader initiative to modernize Croatia's railway infrastructure.

==== Aviation ====
Airports in Croatia are located and serves Dubrovnik, Osijek, Pula, Rijeka, Split, Zadar, and Zagreb. The largest and busiest is Franjo Tuđman Airport in Zagreb, followed by Saint Jerome Airport in Split, Ruđer Bošković Airport in Dubrovnik and Zadar Airport in Zadar, with annual passenger numbers exceeding one million respectively. Croatian airports in terms of passenger arrivals recorded more than 10 million tourists in 2018, 11 million in 2019 and 2023, 13 million in 2024. Airports in Croatia welcomed more than 14 million passengers in 2025.

As of 2024, Croatian flag-carrier Croatia Airlines expanded its international network by introducing direct flights from Zagreb to Tirana, Berlin, and Stockholm. Additionally, the airline launched services connecting Hamburg to Zagreb starting 1 July 2024. In July 2024, the airline took delivery of its first Airbus A220-300 aircraft, marking the beginning of a transition to a more modern and efficient fleet. This initiative includes the acquisition of 13 A220-300 and two A220-100 aircraft, aiming to enhance operational efficiency with 25% lower fuel consumption and reduced emissions. Other airlines operating and providing private flight services in Croatia include ETF Airways, Fly Air41 Airways, Trade Air, Air Pannonia, and Jung Sky.

==== Ports ====
The busiest cargo seaport is the Port of Rijeka. The busiest passenger ports are Port of Split, Port of Dubrovnik and Zadar. Port of Ploče serves as Croatia’s second-largest cargo seaport and functions as the primary maritime gateway for the economic hinterland of neighboring Bosnia and Herzegovina. Jadrolinija is the largest and primary maritime transport and ferry company in Croatia, connecting Croatian islands with Croatian mainland. In addition to its domestic coastal routes, Jadrolinija provides international passenger services across the Adriatic Sea to the Italian ports of Bari and Ancona. Many minor ports serve ferries connecting numerous islands and coastal cities with ferry lines. The largest river port is port of Vukovar, located on the Danube in Vukovar, representing the nation's outlet to the Pan-European transport corridor VII.

==== Energy ====
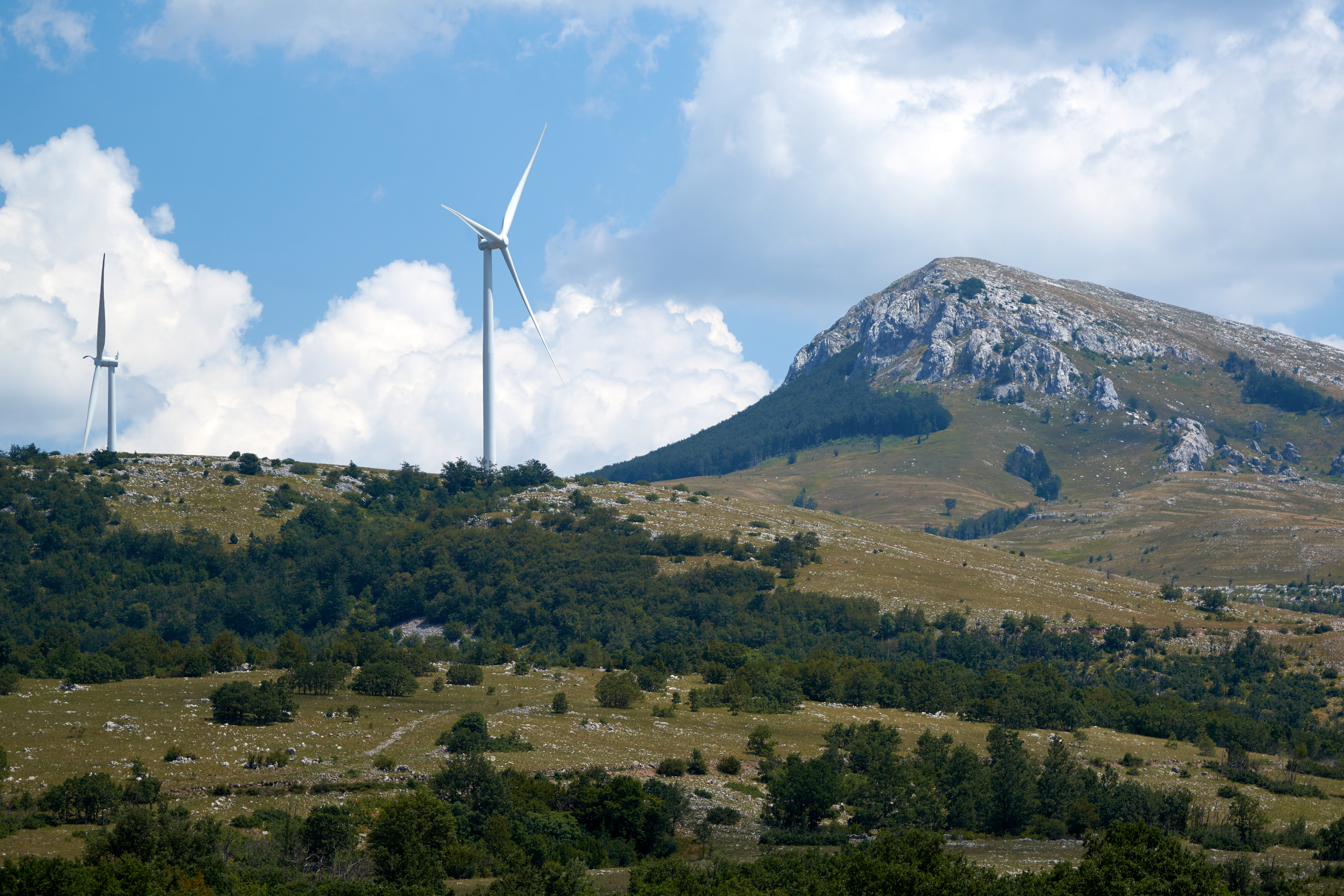
Poštak Wind Farm near Gračac, Zadar County

610 kilometres (380 miles) of crude oil pipelines serve Croatia, connecting the Rijeka oil terminal with refineries in Rijeka and Sisak, and several transhipment terminals. The system has a capacity of 20 million tonnes per year. The natural gas transportation system comprises 2,113 kilometres (1,313 miles) of trunk and regional pipelines, and more than 300 associated structures, connecting production rigs, the Okoli natural gas storage facility, 27 end-users and 37 distribution systems. Croatia also plays an important role in regional energy security. The floating liquefied natural gas import terminal off Krk island LNG Hrvatska commenced operations on 1 January 2021, positioning Croatia as a regional energy leader and contributing to diversification of Europe's energy supply.

In 2010, Croatian energy production covered 85% of nationwide natural gas and 19% of oil demand. In 2016, Croatia's primary energy production involved natural gas (24.8%), hydropower (28.3%), crude oil (13.6%), fuelwood (27.6%), and heat pumps and other renewable energy sources (5.7%). In 2017, net total electrical power production reached 11,543 GWh, while it imported 12,157 GWh or about 40% of its electric power energy needs. Croatia co-owns 50% of the Krško Nuclear Power Plant with neighboring Slovenia. This power plant supplies a large part of Croatian imports and provides 15% of the nation's electricity. According to Eurostat in 2026, Croatia has the highest quantity of water resources per capita in the EU (30,000 m^{3}).

== Demographics ==
Ethnic composition (2021)
| Croats | 91.6% |
| Serbs | 3.2% |
| Other | 5.2% |
2021 Croatian Census

Ethnic structure of Croatia in 2021.

With an estimated population of 3.87 million in 2024, Croatia ranks 128th by population in the world. Its 2018 population density was 72.9 inhabitants per square kilometre, making Croatia one of the more sparsely populated European countries. The overall life expectancy in Croatia at birth was 77.7 years in 2024.

The total fertility rate of 1.46 children per mother, is one of the lowest in the world, far below the replacement rate of 2.1; it remains considerably below the high of 6.18 children rate in 1885. Croatia's death rate has continuously exceeded its birth rate since 1998. Croatia subsequently has one of the world's oldest populations, with an average age of 45.1 years. The population rose steadily from 2.1 million in 1857 until 1991, when it peaked at 4.7 million, with the exceptions of censuses taken in 1921 and 1948, i.e., following the world wars. The natural growth rate is negative with the demographic transition completed in the 1970s. In recent years, the Croatian government has been pressured to increase permit quotas for foreign workers, reaching an all-time high of 68.100 in 2019. In accordance with its immigration policy, Croatia is trying to entice emigrants to return. From 2008 to 2018, Croatia's population dropped by 10%.

Historic demographic shifts are closely tied to Croatia's nation-building efforts and the related 1990s War of Independence. The war displaced large numbers of the population and emigration increased. In 1991, in predominantly occupied areas, more than 400,000 Croats were either removed from their homes by Serb forces or fled the violence. During the war's final days, about 150,000–200,000 Serbs fled before the arrival of Croatian forces during Operation Storm. After the war, the number of displaced persons fell to about 250,000. The Croatian government cared for displaced persons via the social security system and the Office of Displaced Persons and Refugees. Most of the territories abandoned during the war were settled by Croat refugees from Bosnia and Herzegovina, mostly from north-western Bosnia, while some displaced people returned to their homes.

Religious believers according to the 2011 census

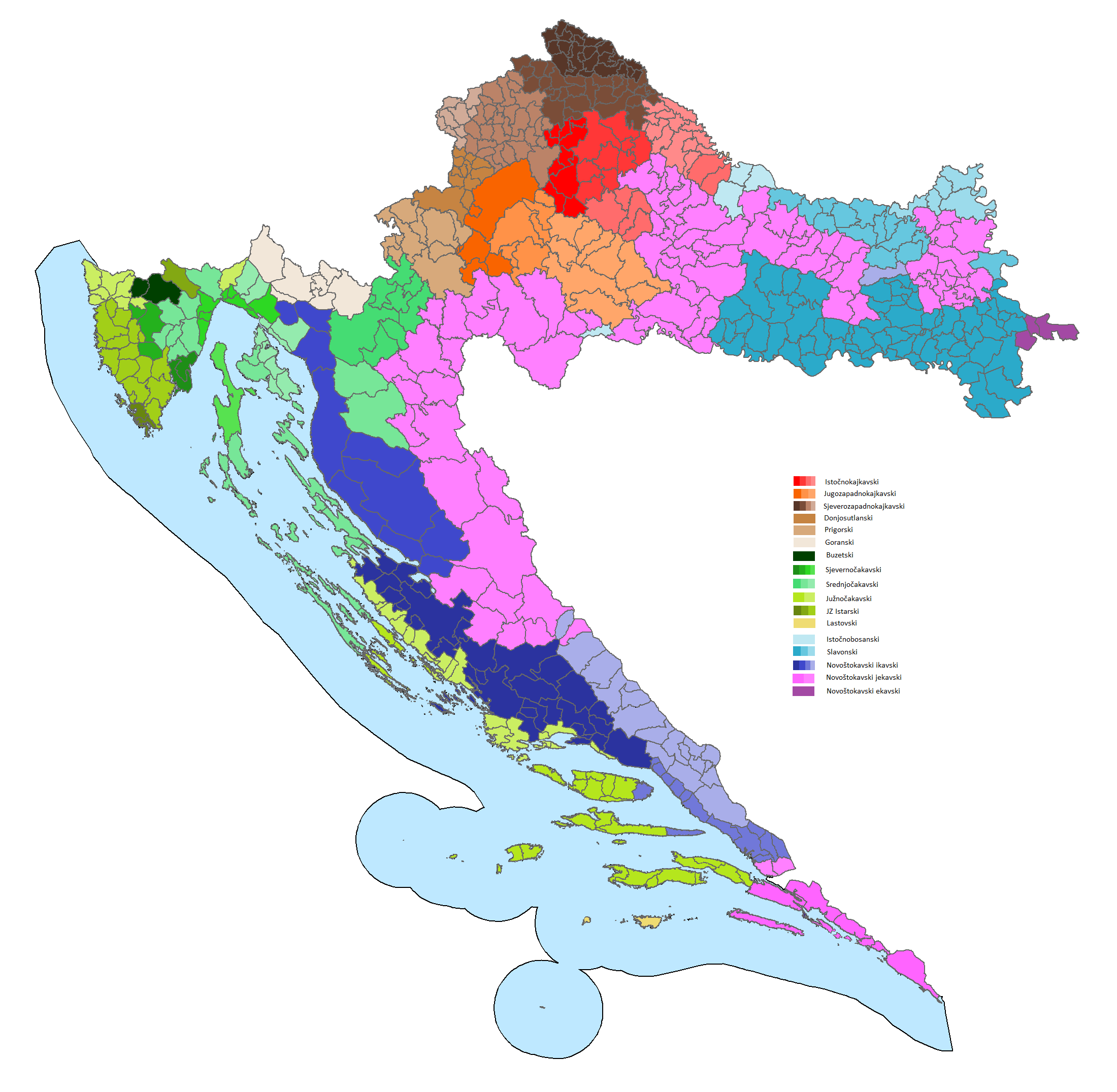
Map of the Shtokavian, Chakavian and Kajkavian dialects in Croatia by municipality

2011 Croatian population density by county in persons per km^{2}

According to the 2024 Croatian Bureau of Statistics report, 12.5% to 14.6% of Croatia's population were immigrants. According to the 2021 census, the majority of inhabitants are Croats (91.6%), followed by Serbs (3.2%), Bosniaks (0.62%), Roma (0.46%), Albanians (0.36%), Italians (0.36%), Hungarians (0.27%), Czechs (0.20%), Slovenes (0.20%), Slovaks (0.10%), Macedonians (0.09%), Germans (0.09%), Montenegrins (0.08%), and others (1.56%). Approximately 4 million Croats live abroad.

Largest cities or towns in Croatia Croatian Bureau of Statistics - 2021 census
| Rank | Name | County | Pop. | Rank | Name | County | Pop. |
|---|---|---|---|---|---|---|---|
| 1 | Zagreb | Zagreb | 767,131 | 11 | Šibenik | Šibenik-Knin | 42,599 |
| 2 | Split | Split-Dalmatia | 161,312 | 12 | Dubrovnik | Dubrovnik-Neretva | 41,562 |
| 3 | Rijeka | Primorje-Gorski Kotar | 108,622 | 13 | Sisak | Sisak-Moslavina | 40,121 |
| 4 | Osijek | Osijek-Baranja | 96,848 | 14 | Kaštela | Split-Dalmatia | 37,794 |
| 5 | Zadar | Zadar | 70,829 | 15 | Samobor | Zagreb County | 37,435 |
| 6 | Velika Gorica | Zagreb County | 61,198 | 16 | Bjelovar | Bjelovar-Bilogora | 36,316 |
| 7 | Pula | Istria | 52,411 | 17 | Vinkovci | Vukovar-Srijem | 30,842 |
| 8 | Slavonski Brod | Brod-Posavina | 50,039 | 18 | Koprivnica | Koprivnica-Križevci | 28,580 |
| 9 | Karlovac | Karlovac | 49,594 | 19 | Čakovec | Međimurje County | 27,122 |
| 10 | Varaždin | Varaždin | 43,782 | 20 | Solin | Split-Dalmatia | 24,862 |

=== Religion ===
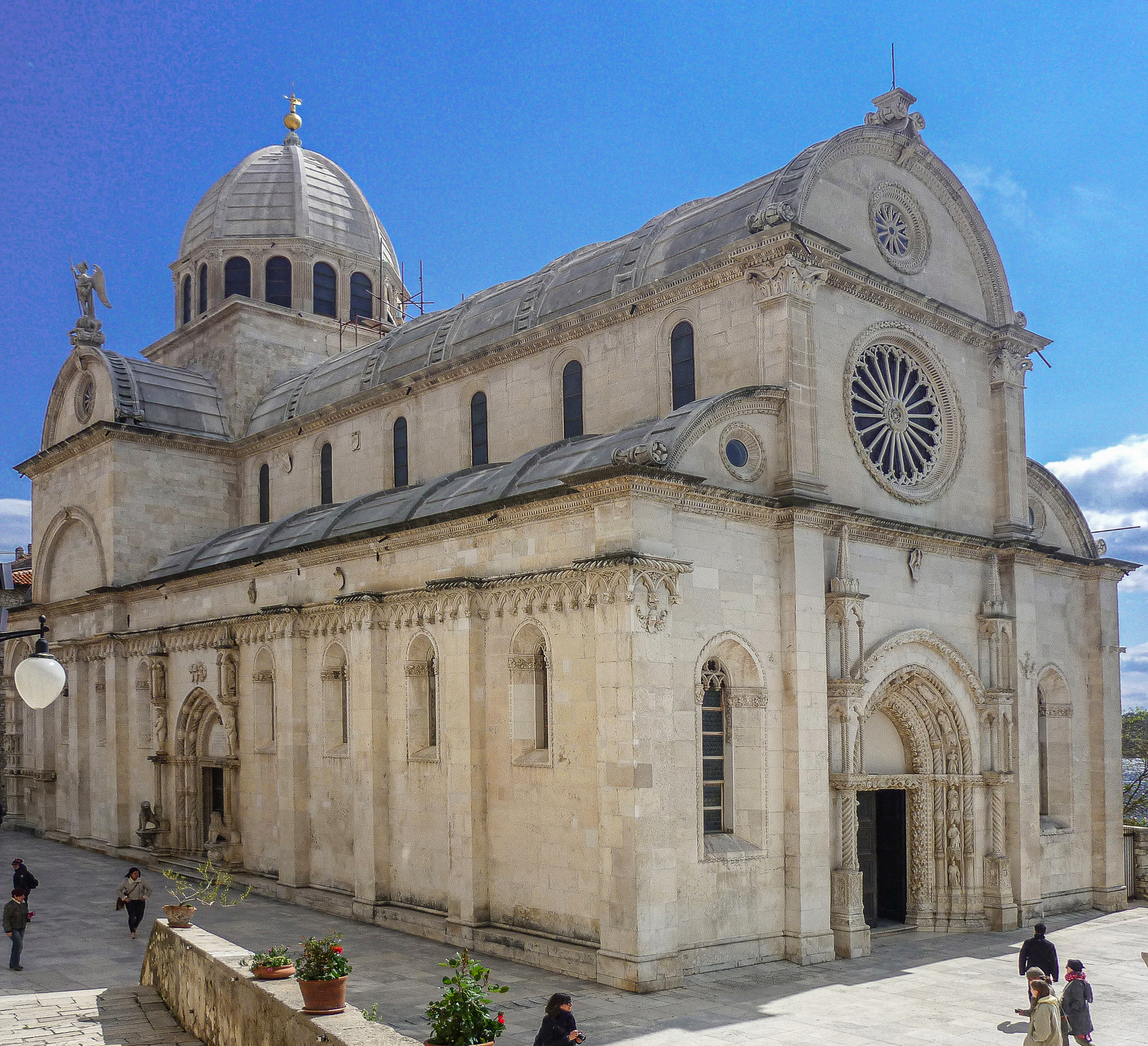
Šibenik Cathedral, since 2000 on the UNESCO World Heritage List

Croatia has no official religion. Freedom of religion is a constitutional right that protects all religious communities as equal before the law and considers them separate from the state.

According to the 2021 census, 87.39% of Croatians identify as Christian; of these, Catholics make up the largest group, accounting for 83.04% of the population, after which follows Eastern Orthodoxy (3.36%), Protestantism (0.26%), and other Christians (0.10%). The largest religion after Christianity is Islam (1.32%). 4.71% of the population describe itself as non-religious. In the Eurostat Eurobarometer Poll of 2010, 69% of the population responded that "they believe there is a God". In a 2009 Gallup poll, 70% answered yes to the question "Is religion an important part of your daily life?" Approximately 24% of the population attend religious services regularly.

=== Languages ===
Croatian is the official language of the Republic of Croatia and has been an official language of the European Union since Croatia's accession in 2013. Croatian replaced Latin as the official language of the Croatian government in the 19th century. Following the Vienna Literary Agreement in 1850, the language and its Latin alphabet underwent reforms to create an unified "Croatian or Serbian" or "Serbo-Croatian" standard, which under various names became the official language of Yugoslavia. In SFR Yugoslavia, from 1972 to 1989, the language was constitutionally designated as the "Croatian literary language" and the "Croatian or Serbian language". It was the result of a resistance to and secession from "Serbo-Croatian" in the form of the Declaration on the Status and Name of the Croatian Literary Language as part of the Croatian Spring. Since gaining independence in the early 1990s, the Republic of Croatia constitutionally designates the language as "Croatian language" and regulates it through linguistic prescription. The long-standing aspiration for development of its own expressions and thus enrichment of the language, as opposed to the adoption of foreign solutions in the form of loanwords, has been described by linguists as Croatian linguistic purism.

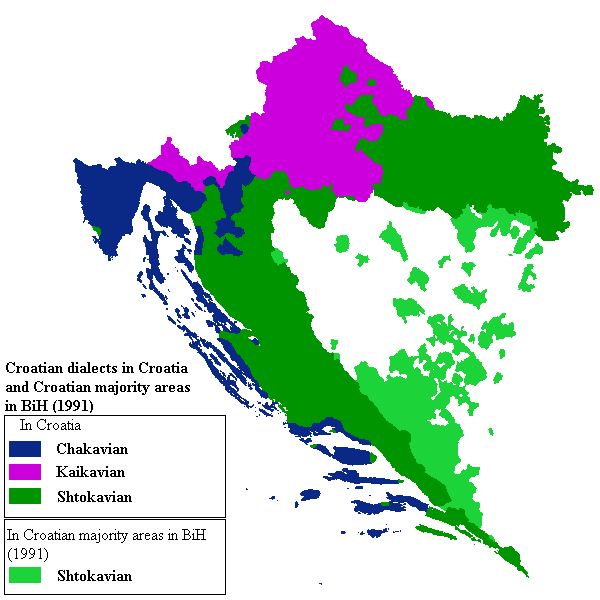
Location map of dialects in Croatia and areas in Bosnia and Herzegovina with Croat majority. Chakavian in blue.

Minority languages are in official use in local government units where more than a third of the population consists of national minorities or where local enabling legislation applies. Those languages are Czech, Hungarian, Italian, Pannonian Rusyn, Serbian, and Slovak. The following minority languages are also recognised: Albanian, Bosnian, Bulgarian, German, Hebrew, Macedonian, Montenegrin, Polish, Romanian, Istro-Romanian, Romani, Russian, Slovene, Turkish, Ukrainian, and Vlach.

According to the 2021 Census, 95.25% of citizens declared Croatian as their native language, 1.16% declared Serbian as their native language, while no other language reaches 0.26%. Croatian is a member of the South Slavic languages and is written using the Latin alphabet. There are three major dialects spoken on the territory of Croatia, with standard Croatian based on the Shtokavian dialect. The Chakavian and Kajkavian dialects are distinguished from Shtokavian by their lexicon, phonology and syntax.

A 2011 survey revealed that 78% of Croats claim knowledge of at least one foreign language. According to a 2005 EC survey, 49% of Croats speak English as the second language, 34% speak German, 14% speak Italian, 10% speak French, 4% speak Russian and 2% speak Spanish. However several large municipalities support minority languages. A majority of Slovenes (59%) have some knowledge of Croatian. The country is a part of various language-based international associations, most notably the European Union Language Association.

=== Education ===
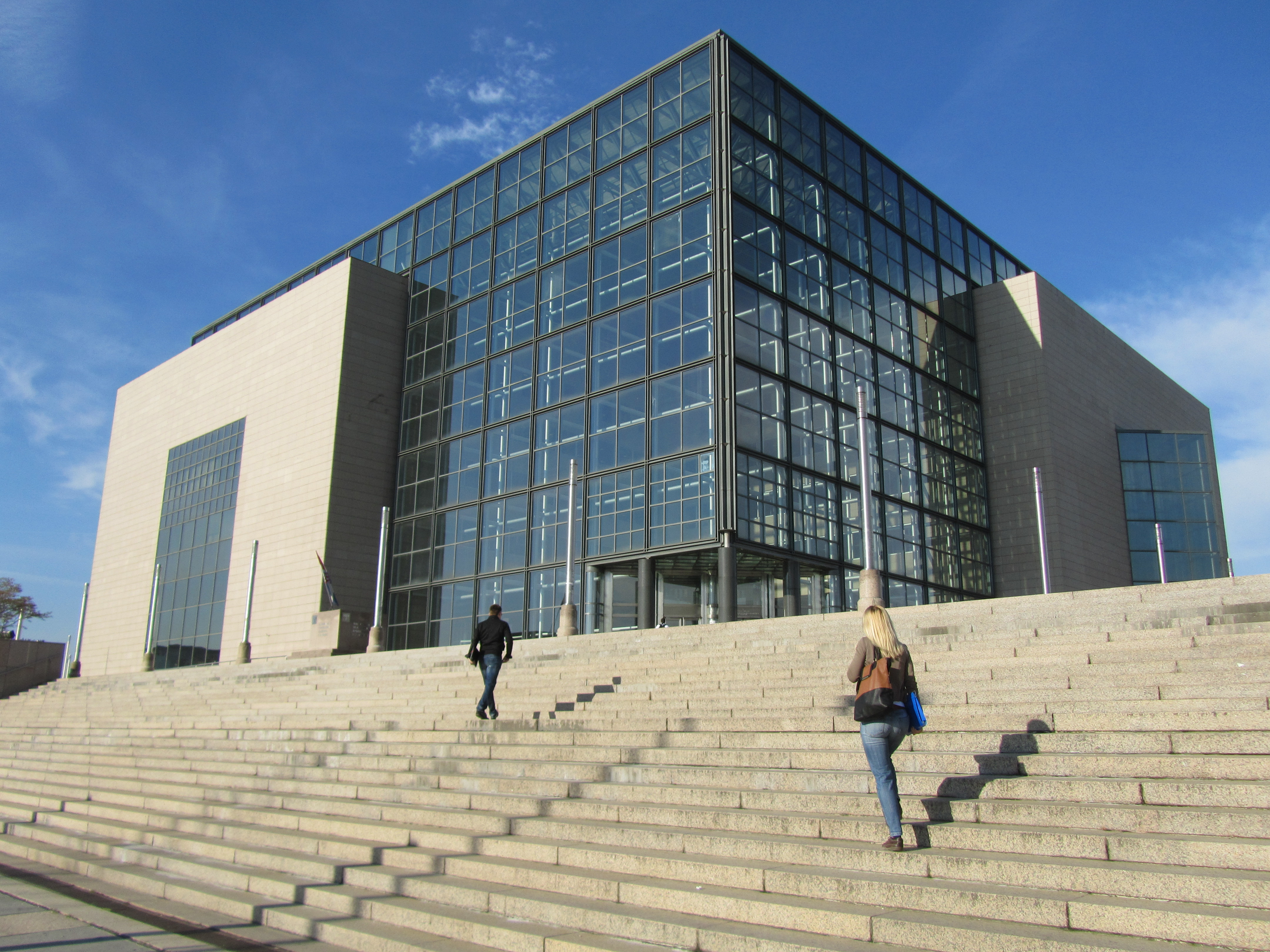
National and University Library

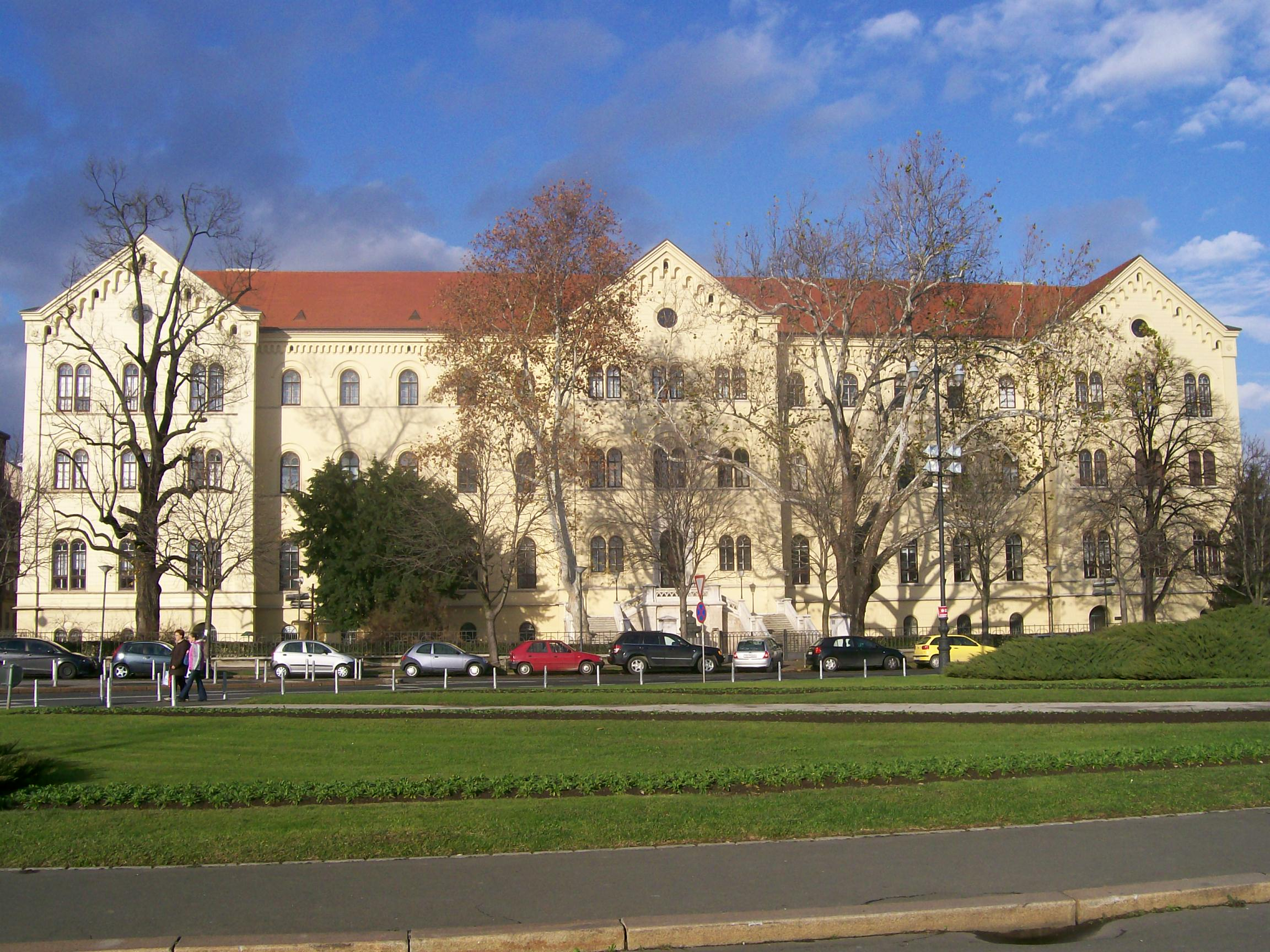
University of Zagreb is the largest Croatian university and the oldest university in Southeastern Europe.

As of 2024, the literacy rate in Croatia was 99.45%. Primary education in Croatia starts at the age of six or seven and consists of eight grades. In 2007 a law was passed to increase free, noncompulsory education until 18 years of age. Compulsory education consists of eight grades of elementary school. Secondary education is provided by gymnasiums and vocational schools. As of the 2022–23 school year, there were 2,073 elementary schools and 738 upper secondary schools in Croatia. Primary and secondary education are also available in languages of recognised minorities in Croatia, where classes are held in Czech, Hungarian, Italian, Serbian, German and Slovak languages.

There are 133 elementary and secondary level music and art schools, as well as 83 elementary and 44 secondary schools for disabled children and youth and 11 elementary and 52 secondary schools for adults. Nationwide leaving exams (Croatian: državna matura) were introduced for secondary education students in the school year 2009–2010. It comprises three compulsory subjects (Croatian language, mathematics, and a foreign language) and optional subjects and is a prerequisite for university education. Croatia has eight public universities and two private universities. The University of Zadar, the first university in Croatia, was founded in 1396 and remained active until 1807, when other institutions of higher education took over until the foundation of the renewed University of Zadar in 2002. The University of Zagreb, founded in 1669, is the oldest continuously operating university in Southeast Europe. There are also 15 polytechnics, of which two are private, and 30 higher education institutions, of which 27 are private. In total, there are 131 institutions of higher education in Croatia, attended by more than 160 thousand students.

In 2022, Croatia's research and development (R&D) expenditure was approximately 1.43% of GDP. Among the scientific institutes operating in Croatia, the largest is the Ruđer Bošković Institute in Zagreb. The Croatian Academy of Sciences and Arts in Zagreb is a learned society promoting language, culture, arts and science from its inception in 1866. Croatia was ranked 40th in the Global Innovation Index in 2025.

The European Investment Bank provided digital infrastructure and equipment to around 150 primary and secondary schools in Croatia. Twenty of these schools got specialised assistance in the form of gear, software, and services to help them integrate the teaching and administrative operations. In 2024, the EIB extended a €207 million loan to the City of Zagreb for infrastructure upgrades, including investments in renewable energy, energy efficiency projects, social and affordable housing, schools, and kindergartens. Additionally, the EIB signed a €49 million loan with the City of Split to co-finance its 2023–2027 multi-sector investment programme, which includes refurbishing public buildings, increasing energy efficiency, and improving technical equipment for public information and communication.

=== Healthcare ===
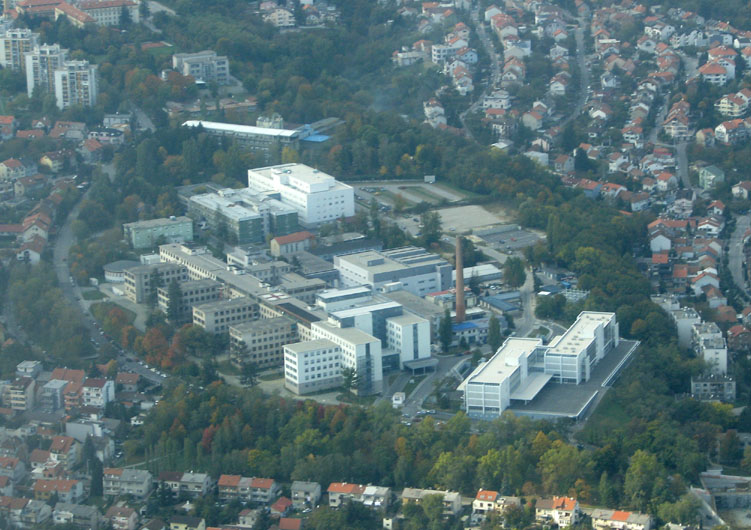
University Hospital Centre Zagreb is the largest hospital in Croatia and the teaching hospital of the University of Zagreb.

Croatia has a universal health care system, whose roots can be traced back to the Hungarian-Croatian Parliament Act of 1891, providing a form of mandatory insurance of all factory workers and craftsmen. The population is covered by a basic health insurance plan provided by statute and optional insurance. In 2017, annual healthcare related expenditures reached 22.2 billion kuna (around €3.0 billion). Healthcare expenditures make up only 0.6% of private health insurance and public spending. In 2022, Croatia spent around 7.2% of its GDP on healthcare. In 2025, Croatia ranked 53rd in the world in life expectancy with 75.8 years for men and 81.9 years for women, and it had a low infant mortality rate of 3.3 per 1,000 live births.

There are hundreds of healthcare institutions in Croatia, including 75 hospitals, and 13 clinics with 23,049 beds. The hospitals and clinics care for more than 700 thousand patients per year and employ 6,642 medical doctors, including 4,773 specialists. There is a total of 69,841 health workers. There are 119 emergency units in health centres, responding to more than a million calls. The principal cause of death in 2022 was cardiovascular disease at 34.3% for men and 43.8% for women, followed by hypertensive disease. In 2022 it was estimated that 37% of Croatians are smokers. According to 2022 data, 35.65% of the Croatian adult population is obese.

== Culture ==
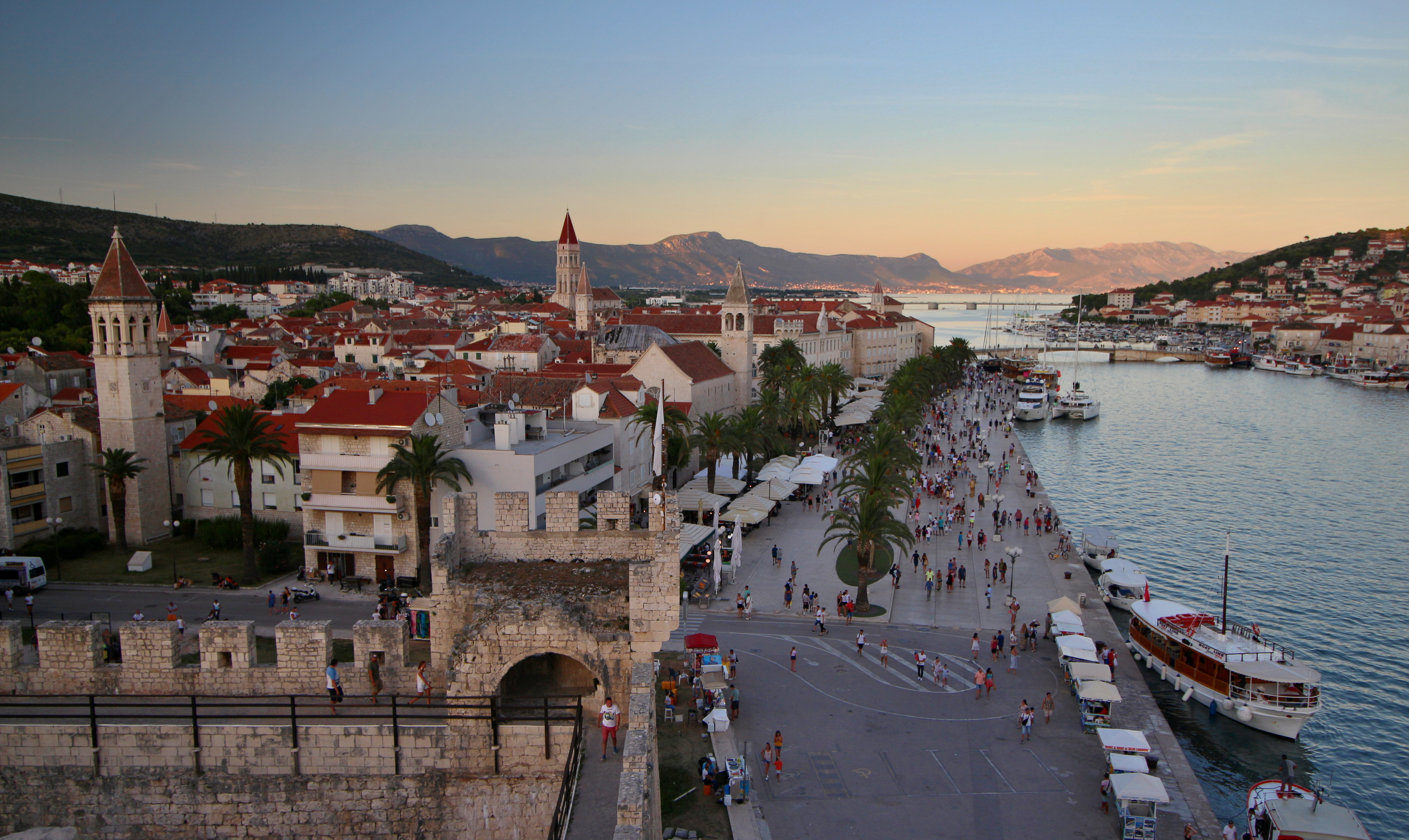
The historic centre of Trogir has been included in the UNESCO list of World Heritage Site since 1997.

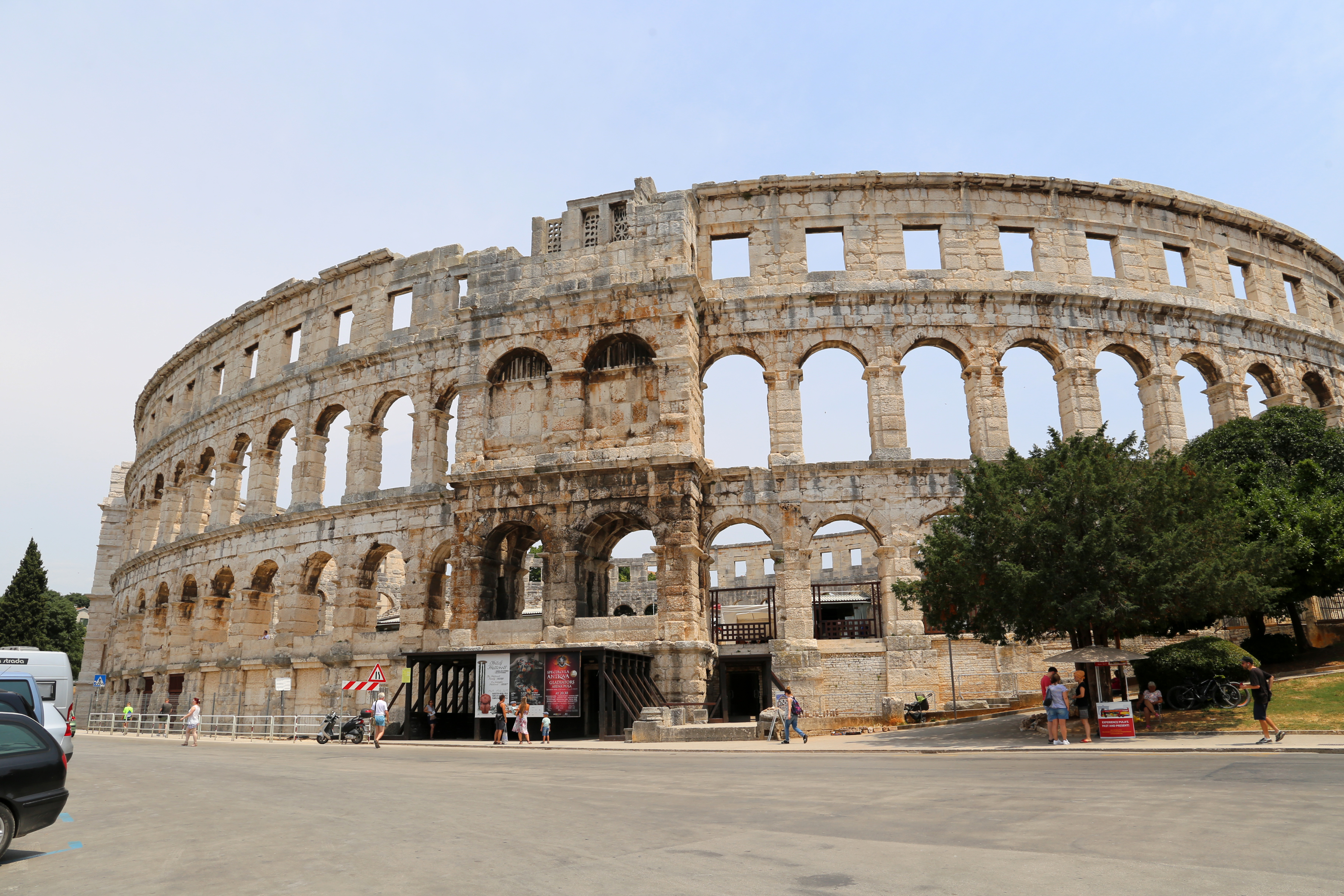
Pula Arena, Roman amphitheatre located in Pula, constructed between 27 BC and AD 68.

Because of its geographical position, Croatia represents a blend of four different cultural spheres. It has been a crossroads of influences from western culture and the east since the schism between the Western Roman Empire and the Byzantine Empire, and also from Central Europe and Mediterranean culture. The Illyrian movement was the most significant period of national cultural history, as the 19th century proved crucial to the emancipation of Croatians and saw unprecedented developments in all fields of art and culture, giving rise to many historical figures.

The Ministry of Culture is tasked with preserving the nation's cultural and natural heritage and overseeing its development. Further activities supporting the development of culture are undertaken at the local government level. The UNESCO's World Heritage List includes ten sites in Croatia and a list of Intangible Cultural Heritage of Croatia. The country is rich with intangible culture and holds 15 of UNESCO's World's intangible culture masterpieces, ranking fourth in the world. A global cultural contribution from Croatia is the necktie, derived from the cravat originally worn by the 17th-century Croatian mercenaries in France.

In 2019, Croatia had 95 professional theatres, 30 professional children's theatres, and 51 amateur theatres visited by more than 2.27 million viewers per year. Professional theatres employ 1,195 artists. There are 42 professional orchestras, ensembles, and choirs, attracting an annual attendance of 297 thousand. There are 75 cinemas with 166 screens and attendance of 5.026 million.

Croatia has 222 museums, visited by more than 2.71 million people in 2023. Furthermore, there are 1,768 libraries, containing 26.8 million volumes, and 19 state archives. The book publishing market is dominated by several major publishers and the industry's centrepiece event—Interliber exhibition held annually at Zagreb Fair.

=== Arts, literature, and music ===
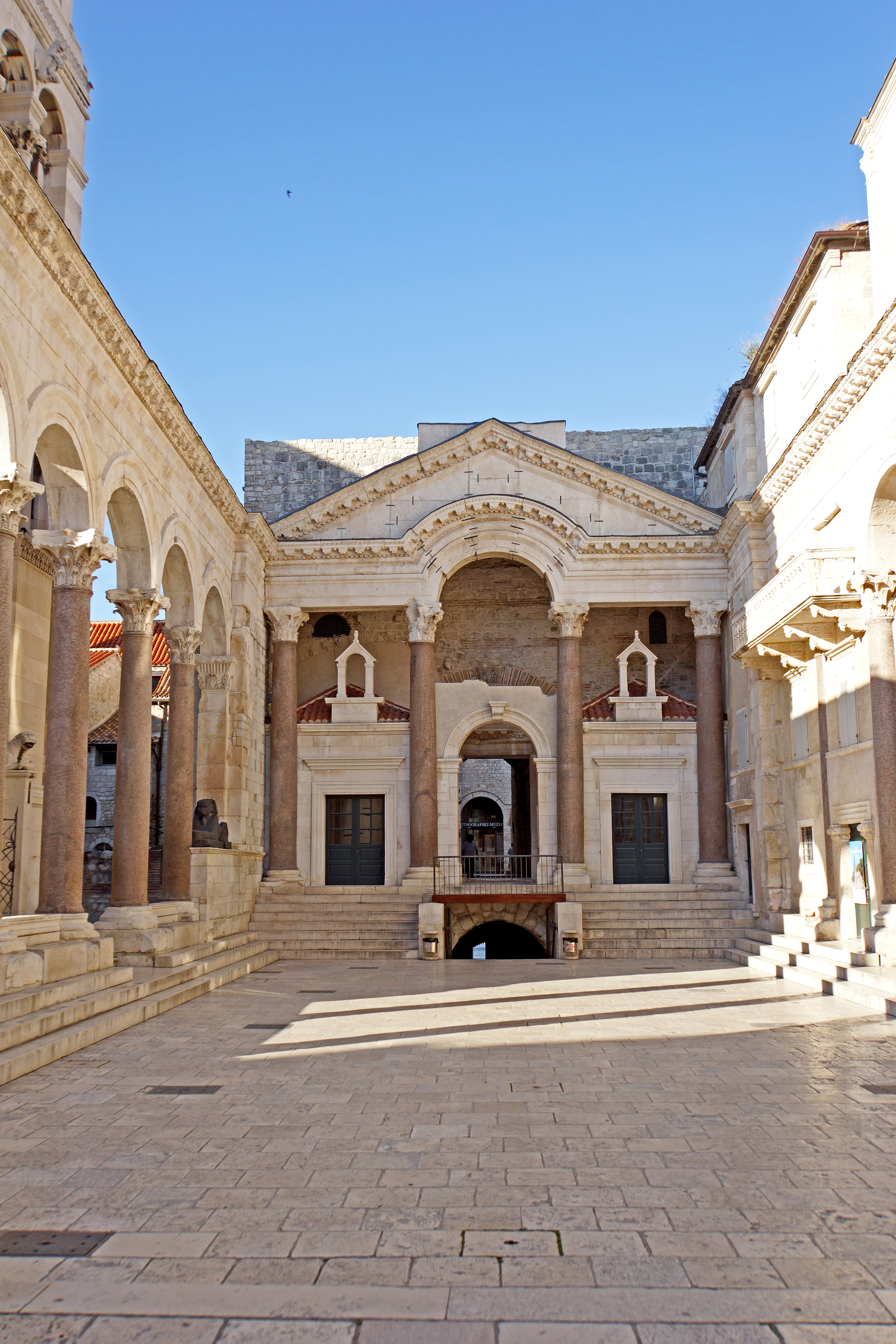
Historical nucleus of Split with the 4th-century Diocletian's Palace was inscribed on the UNESCO list of World Heritage Sites in 1979.

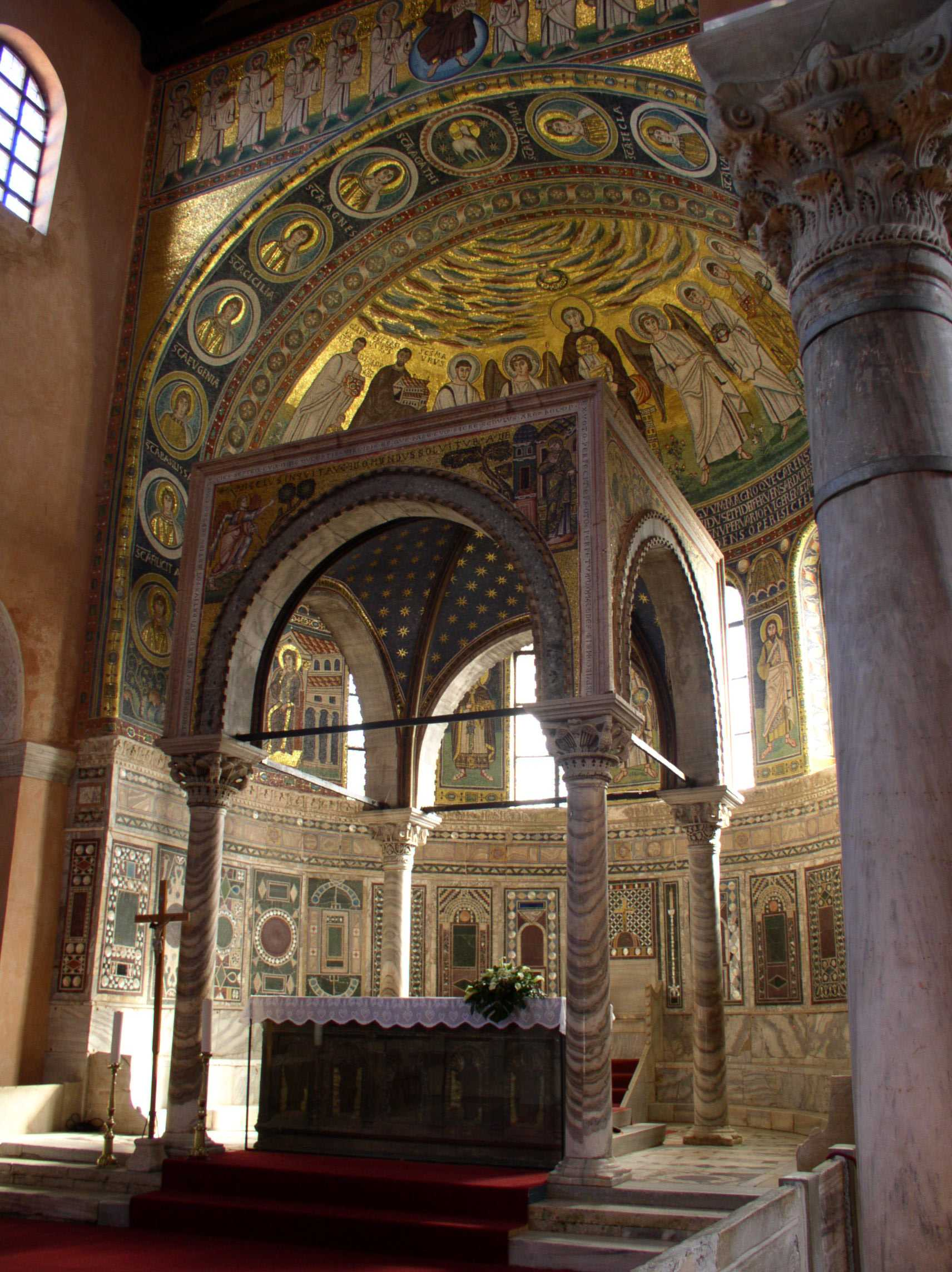
Euphrasian Basilica in Poreč, example of early Byzantine architecture, on the UNESCO World Heritage List since 1997

Architecture in Croatia reflects influences of bordering nations. Austrian and Hungarian influence is visible in public spaces and buildings in the north and the central regions, architecture found along coasts of Dalmatia and Istria exhibits Venetian influence. Squares named after culture heroes, parks, and pedestrian-only zones, are features of Croatian towns and cities, especially where large scale Baroque urban planning took place, for instance in Osijek (Tvrđa), Varaždin, and Karlovac. The subsequent influence of the Art Nouveau was reflected in contemporary architecture. The architecture is the Mediterranean with a Venetian and Renaissance influence in major coastal urban areas exemplified in works of Giorgio da Sebenico and Nicolas of Florence such as the Cathedral of St. James in Šibenik. The oldest preserved examples of Croatian architecture are the 9th-century churches, with the largest and the most representative among them being Church of St. Donatus in Zadar.

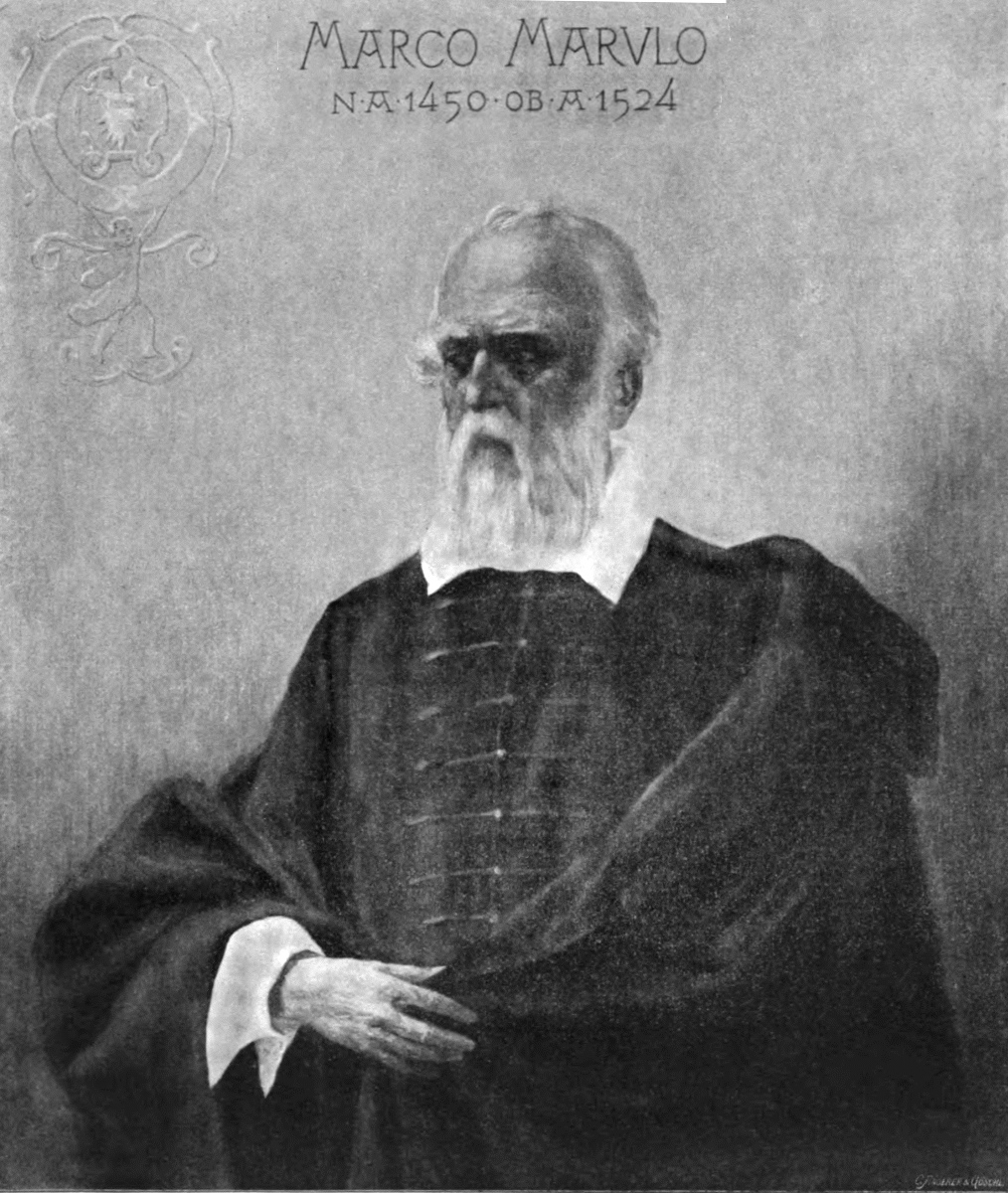
Marko Marulić (18 August 1450 – 5 January 1524), Croatian poet, lawyer, judge, and Renaissance humanist who coined the term "psychology". He is the national poet of Croatia.

Besides the architecture encompassing the oldest artworks, there is a history of artists in Croatia reaching the Middle Ages. In that period the stone portal of the Trogir Cathedral was made by Radovan, representing the most important monument of Romanesque sculpture from Medieval Croatia. The Renaissance had the greatest impact on the Adriatic Sea coast since the remainder was embroiled in the Hundred Years' Croatian–Ottoman War. With the waning of the Ottoman Empire, art flourished during the Baroque and Rococo. The 19th and 20th centuries brought affirmation of numerous Croatian artisans, helped by several patrons of the arts such as bishop Josip Juraj Strossmayer. Croatian artists of the period achieving renown were Vlaho Bukovac, Ivan Meštrović, and Ivan Generalić.

The Baška tablet, a stone inscribed with the glagolitic alphabet found on the Krk island and dated to c. 1100, is considered to be the oldest surviving prose in Croatian. The beginning of more vigorous development of Croatian literature is marked by the Renaissance and Marko Marulić. Besides Marulić, Renaissance playwright Marin Držić, Baroque poet Ivan Gundulić, Croatian national revival poet Ivan Mažuranić, novelist, playwright, and poet August Šenoa, children's writer Ivana Brlić-Mažuranić, writer and journalist Marija Jurić Zagorka, poet and writer Antun Gustav Matoš, poet Antun Branko Šimić, expressionist and realist writer Miroslav Krleža, poet Tin Ujević and novelist, and short story writer Ivo Andrić are often cited as the greatest figures in Croatian literature.

Croatian music varies from classical operas to modern-day rock. Vatroslav Lisinski created the country's first opera, Love and Malice, in 1846. Ivan Zajc composed more than a thousand pieces of music, including masses and oratorios. Pianist Ivo Pogorelić has performed across the world.

=== Media ===
In Croatia, the Constitution guarantees the freedom of the press and the freedom of speech. Croatia ranked 64th in the 2019 Press Freedom Index report compiled by Reporters Without Borders which noted that journalists who investigate corruption, organised crime or war crimes face challenges and that the Government was trying to influence the public broadcaster HRT's editorial policies. In its 2019 Freedom in the World report, the Freedom House classified freedoms of press and speech in Croatia as generally free from political interference and manipulation, noting that journalists still face threats and occasional attacks. The state-owned news agency HINA runs a wire service in Croatian and English on politics, economics, society, and culture.

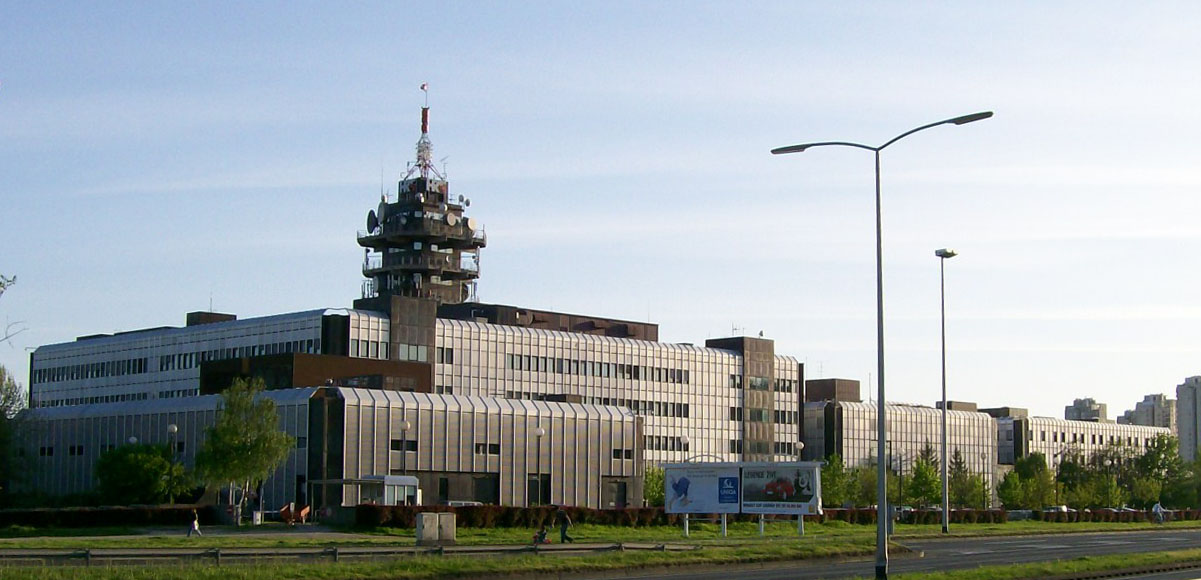
Radio Zagreb, now a part of Croatian national public broadcasting company, Croatian Radiotelevision, was the first public radio station in Southeast Europe.

As of January 2021, there are thirteen nationwide free-to-air DVB-T television channels, with Croatian Radiotelevision (HRT) operating four, RTL Televizija three, and Nova TV operating two channels, and the Croatian Olympic Committee, Kapital Net d.o.o., and Author d.o.o. companies operate the remaining three. Also, there are 21 regional or local DVB-T television channels. The HRT is also broadcasting a satellite TV channel. In 2020, there were 147 radio stations and 27 TV stations in Croatia. Cable television and IPTV networks are gaining ground. Cable television already serves 450 thousand people, around 10% of the total population of the country.

In 2010, 267 newspapers and 2,676 magazines were published in Croatia. The print media market is dominated by the Croatian-owned Hanza Media and Austrian-owned Styria Media Group who publish their flagship dailies Jutarnji list, Večernji list and 24sata. Other influential newspapers are Novi list and Slobodna Dalmacija. In 2020, 24sata was the most widely circulated daily newspaper, followed by Večernji list and Jutarnji list.

Croatia competed in the Eurovision Song Contest as part of Yugoslavia since 1961. The first and only victory Yugoslavia achieved in the competition was accomplished by the Croatian pop band Riva in 1989. Since its debut at the 1993 contest, Croatia won two fourth places at the 1996 and 1999 contests, and one second place at the 2024 contest, marking the country's best result to date as an independent nation.

=== Film industry ===
Croatia's film industry is small and heavily subsidised by the government, mainly through grants approved by the Ministry of Culture with films often being co-produced by HRT. Croatian cinema produces between five and ten feature films per year. Pula Film Festival, the national film awards event held annually in Pula, is the most prestigious film event featuring national and international productions. Animafest Zagreb, founded in 1972, is the prestigious annual film festival dedicated to the animated film. The first greatest accomplishment by Croatian filmmakers was achieved by Dušan Vukotić when he won the 1961 Academy Award for Best Animated Short Film for Ersatz (Croatian: Surogat). Croatian film producer Branko Lustig won the Academy Awards for Best Picture for Schindler's List and Gladiator. In addition to that, Croatian filmmaker Nebojša Slijepčević got nominated for 97th Academy Awards in category for Best Live Action Short Film for his 2024 movie The Man Who Could Not Remain Silent (Croatian: Čovjek koji nije mogao šutjeti), making it first Croatian nomination in that category, and first since its independence.

Before and since its independence, Croatia has become a popular filming destination amongs international filming productions, and a lot of blockbuster films and TV series have been filmed in Croatia including: Game of Thrones, Star Wars: The Last Jedi, Robin Hood in Dubrovnik, Speak No Evil, Season of the Witch and Titius in Istria, Infinity Pool in Šibenik, Canary Black, Hitman's Wife's Bodyguard, Sophie's Choice, Citizen Vigilante, Armour of God and Fiddler on the roof in Zagreb, Mamma Mia! Here We Go Again on island of Vis, Succession on the island of Korčula, Hercules, The Weekend Away, Bliss in Split, The Peacemaker, Lee and many others. Croatia became an international filming location thanks to its biodiversity, natural landscape and cheaper filming costs. In last 11 years there has been 122 projects for international films in Croatia, and €263 million spent as part of the Filming in Croatia which increased in last years due to high demand for its location.

=== Cuisine ===
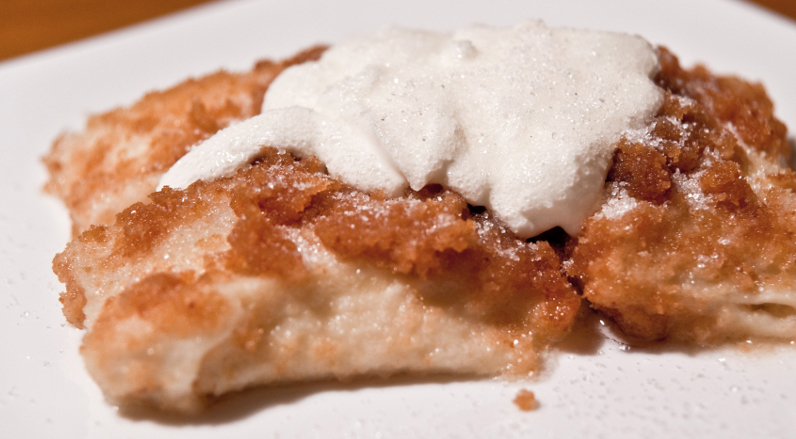
Zagorski štrukli

Croatian traditional cuisine varies from one region to another. Dalmatia and Istria have culinary influences of Italian and other Mediterranean cuisines which prominently feature various seafood, cooked vegetables and pasta, and condiments such as olive oil and garlic. Austrian, Hungarian, Turkish, and Balkan culinary styles influenced continental cuisine. In that area, meats, freshwater fish, and vegetable dishes are predominant.

There are two distinct wine-producing regions in Croatia. The continental in the northeast of the country, especially Slavonia, produces premium wines, particularly whites. Along the north coast, Istrian and Krk wines are similar to those in neighbouring Italy, while further south in Dalmatia, Mediterranean-style red wines are the norm. Annual production of wine exceeds 72 million litres as of 2017. Croatia was almost exclusively a wine-consuming country up until the late 18th century when a more massive beer production and consumption started.

As of 2026, 111 restaurants in Croatia are featured on the Michelin Guide, with 14 of them having at least one Michelin star.

=== Sports ===
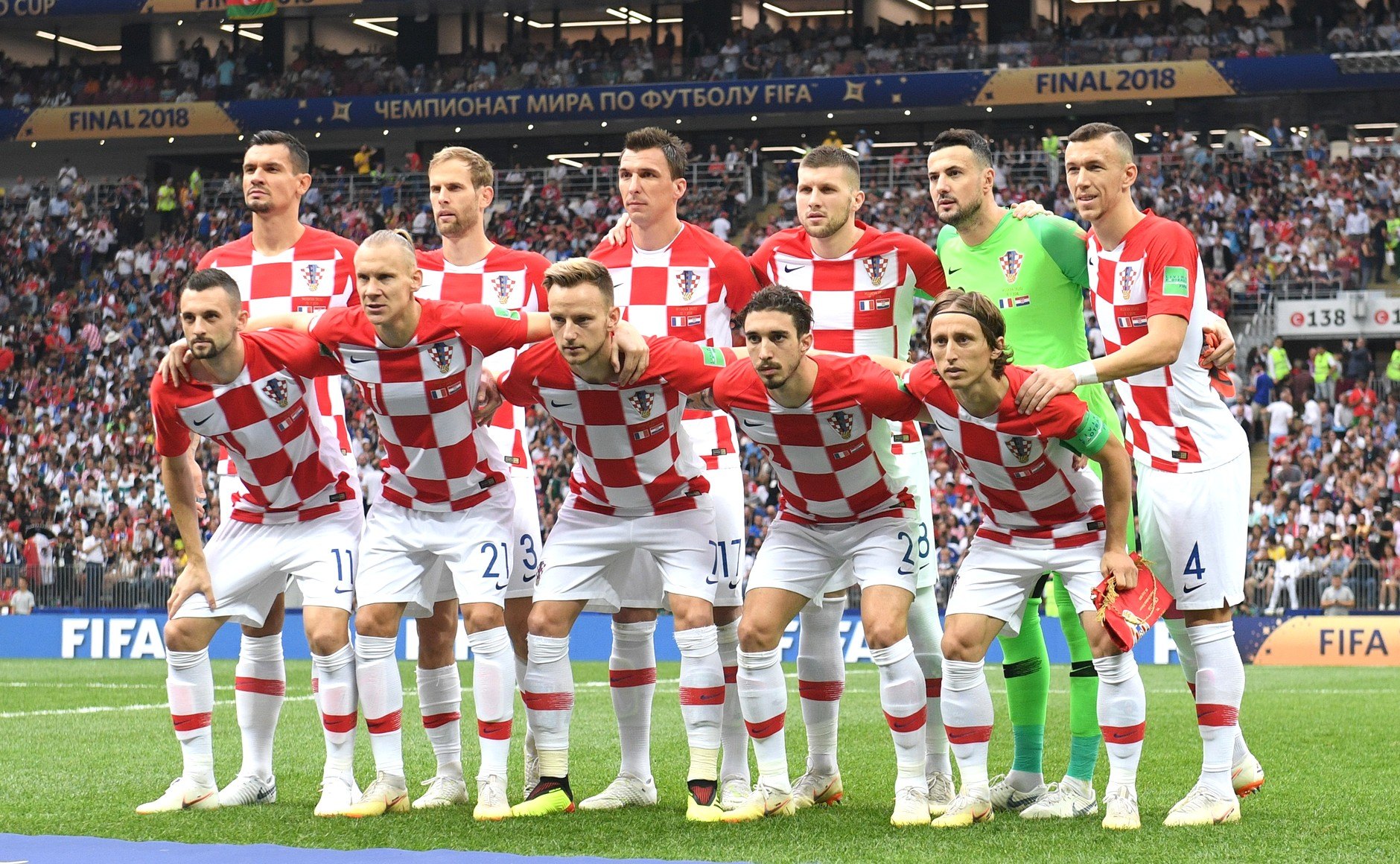
Croatia national football team in World Cup 2018 in Russia

Croatia has a long tradition of sports dating back to Roman times, followed by popular medieval knights' tournaments. Modern organized sports began in the late 19th century with the founding of sports associations like Hrvatski Sokol in 1874. By the early 20th century, many sports organizations emerged, including the Croatian Sports Association established in 1909. Croatian sports' development has been closely related to the Olympic movement, with Franjo Bučar playing a key role in promoting sports for Croatian independence. Sport is part of the school curriculum, and many children engage in extracurricular activities. To support sports development, Croatia enacted the National Sport Programme in 2019. Funding for sports comes from the state budget, sponsorship, and membership fees. The Croatian Olympic Committee, established in 1991, oversees over 80 national sports associations.

The most popular sports in Croatia are football, handball, basketball and water polo. In 2024, there were over 4,500 chess association members. With about 12,500 sports associations, football is the most popular sport, hosting nearly 1,500 clubs and 110,000 players, achieving significant milestones, including bronze at the 1998 World Cup, silver at the 2018 World Cup and another bronze at 2022 World Cup. Croatians have participated in the Olympics since 1992 and have won 59 Olympic medals, including 20 gold. The national tennis team has won two Davis Cup titles and won a gold medal at the 2020 Summer Olympics in men's doubles. The national handball and water polo teams are also been successful, each achieving multiple championships and medals. Rowing has seen success as well, winning multiple Olympic and World Championship medals. In gymnastics, athletes have also made their mark, winning medals in European and World Championships.

Croatia hosted several major sports competitions, including the 2009 World Men's Handball Championship, the 2007 World Table Tennis Championships, the 2010 European Individual Chess Championship, the 2000 World Rowing Championships, the 1987 Summer Universiade, the 1979 Mediterranean Games, and several European Championships, including the 2000, 2018 and 2025 World Men's Handball Championship, 2024 Men's European Water Polo Championship.

== See also ==
- Outline of Croatia
