= Fauna of Great Britain =

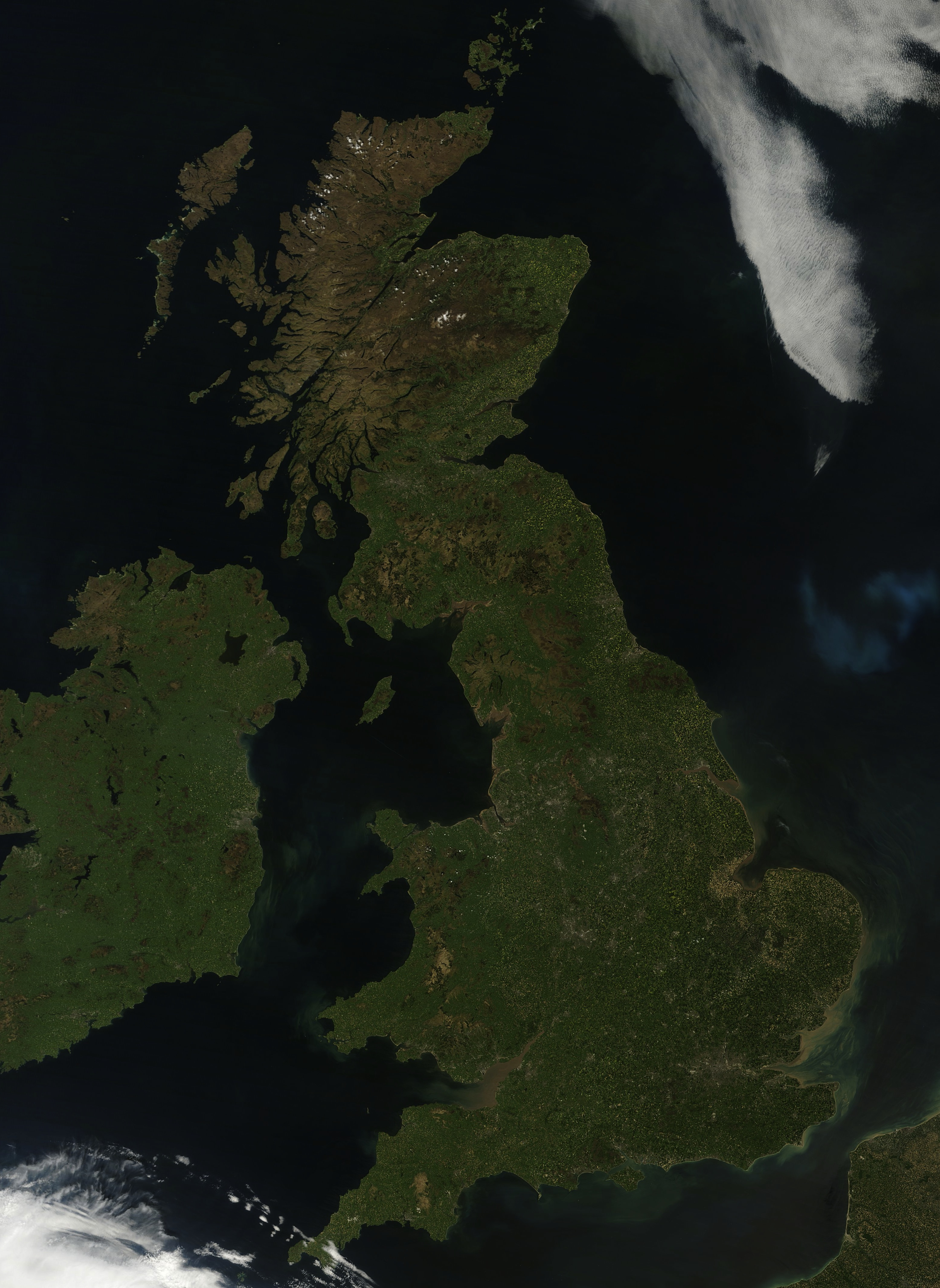
A satellite image of Great Britain

The island of Great Britain, along with the rest of the archipelago known as the British Isles, has a largely temperate climate. It contains a relatively small fraction of the world's wildlife. The biota was severely diminished in the last ice age, and shortly (in geological terms) thereafter was separated from the continent by the English Channel's formation. Since then, humans have hunted the most dangerous forms (the wolf, (Note: The last wolf was allegedly killed in 1743.) the brown bear and the wild boar) to extinction, though domesticated forms such as the dog and the pig remain. The wild boar has subsequently been reintroduced as a meat animal.

== Overview ==
In most of Great Britain there is a temperate climate, with high levels of precipitation and medium levels of sunlight. Further northwards, the climate becomes colder and coniferous forests appear, replacing the largely deciduous forests of the south. There are a few variations in the generally temperate British climate, with some areas of subarctic conditions, such as the Scottish Highlands and Teesdale, and even sub-tropical in the Isles of Scilly. Animals have to cope with seasonal changes across the British Isles, such as in levels of sunlight, rainfall and temperature, as well as the risk of snow and frost during the winter.

Since the mid 18th century, Great Britain has gone through industrialisation and increasing urbanisation. From 1970 to 2024, 41% of species declined in abundance. Songbirds in particular are becoming scarcer, and habitat loss has affected larger mammalian species. Some species have however adapted to the expanding urban environment, particularly the red fox, which is the most successful urban mammal after the brown rat, and other creatures such as common wood pigeon.

== Invertebrates ==
=== Molluscs ===
There are 220 species of non-marine molluscs that have been recorded as living in the wild in Britain. Two of them (Fruticicola fruticum and Cernuella neglecta) are locally extinct. In addition there are 14 gastropod species that live only in greenhouses.

=== Insects ===
There are more than 20,000 species of insects of Great Britain.

=== Spiders ===
There are some 650 species of spider in the UK. Ten of the more common are:

- Garden spider
- Giant house spider
- Zebra jumping spider
- Cucumber spider
- Nursery web spider
- Buzzing spider
- Money spider
- Labyrinth spider
- Cave spider
- Noble false widow spider

== Vertebrates ==
=== Amphibians ===
The species of amphibian native to Britain are the great crested newt, smooth newt, palmate newt, common toad, natterjack toad, common frog and the pool frog. In addition, the agile frog, moor frog and (perhaps) European tree frog are regarded as extirpated natives, lost likely prior to 1800 CE. Several other species have become naturalised.

=== Reptiles ===
Like many temperate areas, Great Britain has few snake species: the European adder is the only venomous snake to be found there. The other notable snakes found in Great Britain are the barred grass snake and the smooth snake. Great Britain has three native species of lizard: slowworms, sand lizards and viviparous lizards. There are also turtles, such as leatherback turtles to be found in the Irish Sea, although these are rarely seen. Other reptile species exist but are not native: aesculapian snake, wall lizard and green lizard.

=== Birds ===
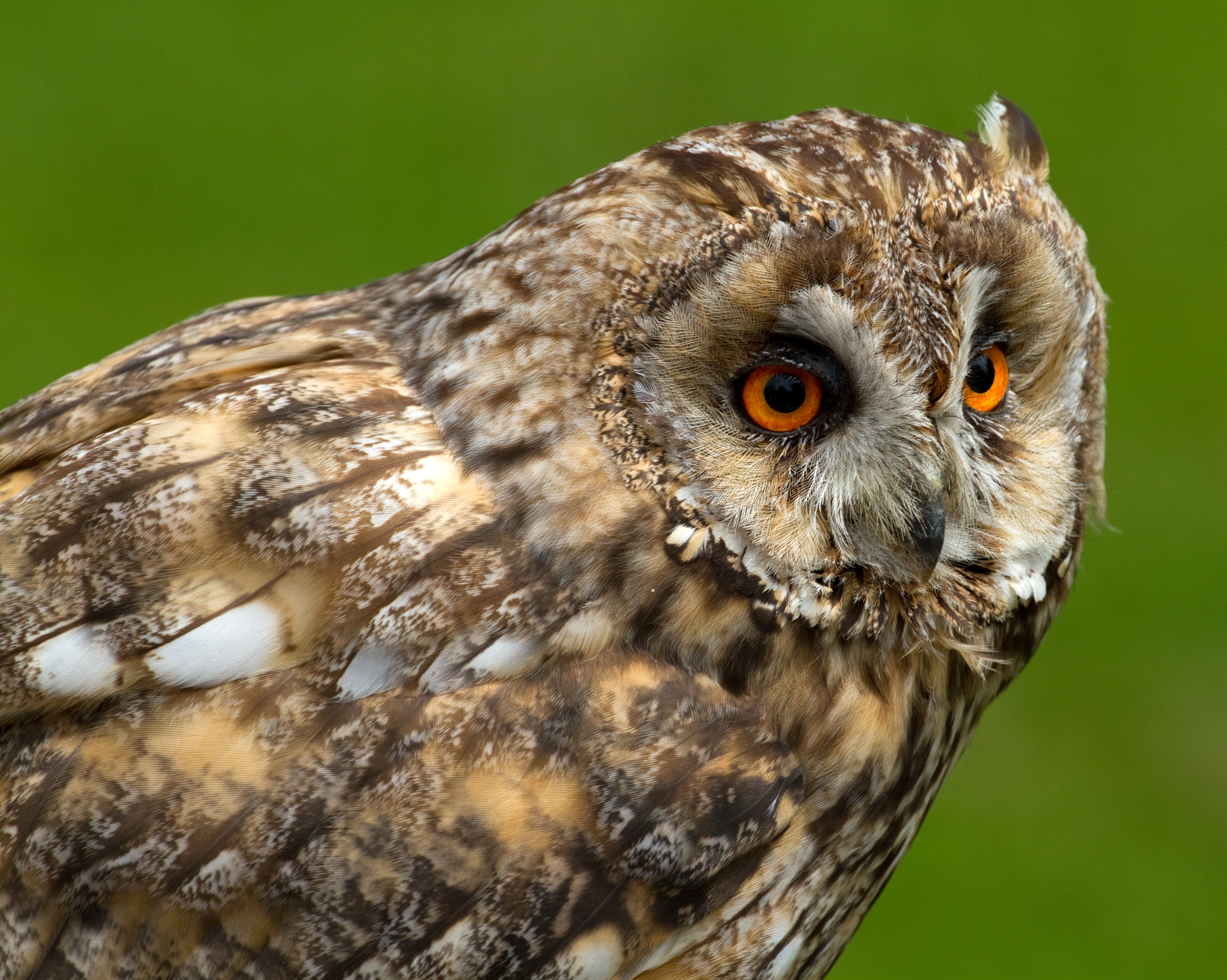
A long-eared owl

In general the avifauna of Britain is similar to that of Europe, consisting largely of Palaearctic species. As an island, it has fewer breeding species than continental Europe. Some species, like the crested lark, breed as close as northern France, but have not colonised Britain. The mild winters mean that many species that cannot cope with harsher conditions can winter in Britain, and also that there is a large influx of wintering birds from the European continent and beyond. There are about 250 species regularly recorded in Great Britain, and another 350 that occur with varying degrees of rarity.

=== Mammals ===
Large mammals are not particularly numerous in Great Britain. Many of the large mammal species, such as the grey wolf and the brown bear, were hunted to extinction many centuries ago. However, in recent times some of these large mammals have been tentatively reintroduced to some areas of Britain. The largest wild mammals that remain in Britain today are predominantly members of the deer family. The red deer is the largest native mammal species, and is common throughout England, Scotland and Wales.

The other indigenous species include the roe deer and the wild boar. The common fallow deer was not naturally present in Britain during the Holocene, having been brought over from France by the Normans in the late 11th century. It has become well established, though the fallow deer was naturally present in Britain during the previous Eemian interglacial. The sika deer is another small species of deer which is not indigenous, originating from Japan. It is widespread and expanding in Scotland from west to east, with a strong population in Peeblesshire. Bands of sika exist across the north and south of England though the species is absent in Wales.

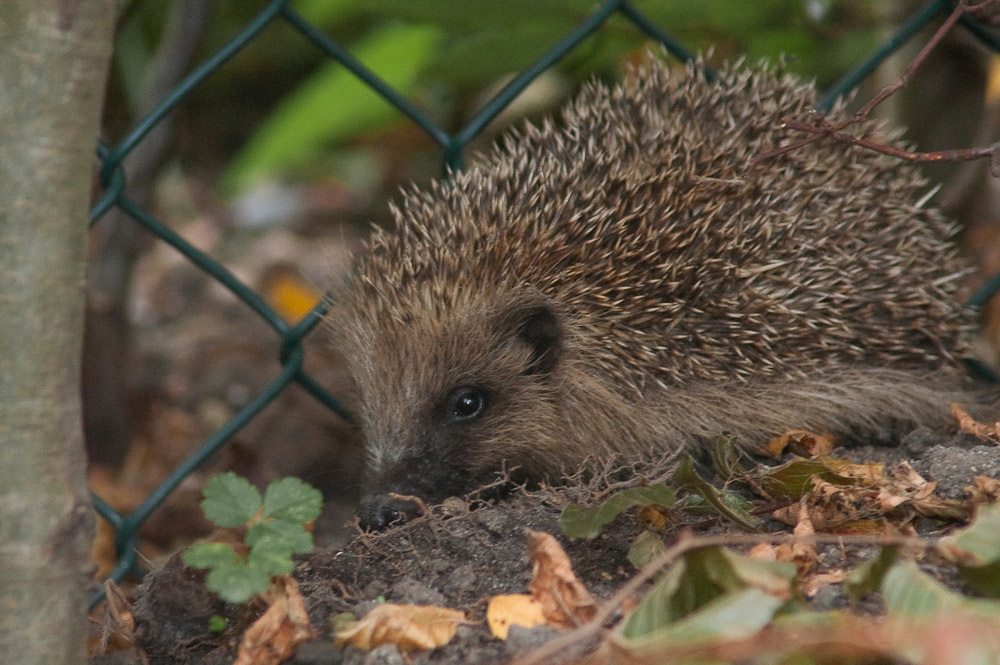
A European hedgehog

There are also several species of insectivore found in Britain. The hedgehog is probably the most widely known as it is a regular visitor to urban gardens. The mole is also widely recognised and its subterranean lifestyle causes much damage to garden lawns. Shrews are also fairly common, and the smallest, the pygmy shrew, is one of the smallest mammals in the world. There are also eighteen species of bat found in Britain: the pipistrelle is the smallest and the most common.

Rodents are also numerous across Britain, particularly the brown rat which is by far the most abundant urban mammal after humans. Some however, are becoming increasingly rare. Habitat destruction has led to a decrease in the population of dormice and bank voles found in Britain. Due to the introduction of the North American grey squirrel, the red squirrel had become largely extinct in England and Wales, with the last populations existing in parts of North West England, Brownsea Island in Poole Harbour, and on the Isle of Wight. Eurasian beavers were formerly native to Britain before becoming extinct by the early 16th century due to hunting. They are being reintroduced in some areas.

European rabbit and European hare were introduced in Roman times, while the indigenous mountain hare remains only in Scotland and a small re-introduced population in Derbyshire.

There are a variety of carnivores, especially from the weasel family (ranging in size from the weasel, stoat and European polecat to the European badger, pine marten, recently introduced mink and semiaquatic otter). In the absence of the locally extinct grey wolf and brown bear the largest carnivores are the badger, red fox, the adaptability and opportunism of which has allowed it to proliferate in the urban environment, and the European wildcat whose elusiveness has caused some confusion over population numbers, and is believed to be highly endangered, partly by hybridisation with the domestic cat.

Various species of seal and dolphin are found seasonally on British shores and coastlines, along with harbour porpoises, orcas, and many other sea mammals.

=== Fish ===
Great Britain has about forty species of native freshwater fish, of which the largest is the salmon. The saltwater fish include some larger species such as sharks.

== Extinct or extirpated animals ==
During the previous Eemian Interglacial (130,000-115,000 years ago) when Britain had a similar or slightly warmer temperate climate as it does today, the large mammal fauna of Britain was considerably more diverse than it is at present or earlier in the Holocene. Large herbivore species present during the Eemian not present in Britain during the Holocene include the large straight-tusked elephant, the narrow-nosed rhinoceros, the hippopotamus, Irish elk and bison, in addition to the currently present roe, fallow and red deer. Large carnivores present during this time include hyenas (Crocuta spelaea) and lions (Panthera spelaea) in addition to wolves and brown bears. During the Holocene, Britain was inhabited by the aurochs (the wild ancestor of modern domestic cattle) until its extinction around 3,500 years ago. The Eurasian lynx was also formerly native to Britain during the Holocene, with its youngest records dating to around 1,500 years ago during the early medieval period. The moose/elk was present in Britain during the early Holocene, but became extinct by around 5600 years ago. The European pond turtle was also present in Britain during the Holocene (as it had been during the Eemian), with the youngest radiocarbon-dated records dating to around 5,500 years ago.

== See also ==
- Biodiversity in British Overseas Territories
- Fauna of Europe
- Fauna of Scotland
- Flora and fauna of the Outer Hebrides
- Flora and fauna of Cornwall
- Fauna of the Isles of Scilly
- Fauna of Ireland
- Fauna of England
- Fauna of Wales
- Atlases of the flora and fauna of Britain and Ireland
- Biota of the Isle of Man
- List of endangered species in the British Isles
- Introduced species of the British Isles
- List of extinct animals of Britain
- Animal welfare in the United Kingdom
