= Fauna of England =

Native animals of England

The fauna of England is similar to that of other areas British Isles and lies within the Palearctic realm. England's fauna is mainly made up of small animals and is notable for having few large mammals, but in similarity with other island nations; many bird species.

England for the most part has an oceanic climate, which lacks extremes of heat or cold and provides plentiful rainfall making the country a rather 'green' environment and providing much food for small and grazing animals.

England is different in respect to Scotland in its wildlife due to its slightly warmer climate, lower land levels and more dense populations, and whilst this is bad for some species of animals, it is good for others.

The fauna of England is also very diverse since its landscapes are very different from each other and so this is represented in the fauna.

== Overview ==
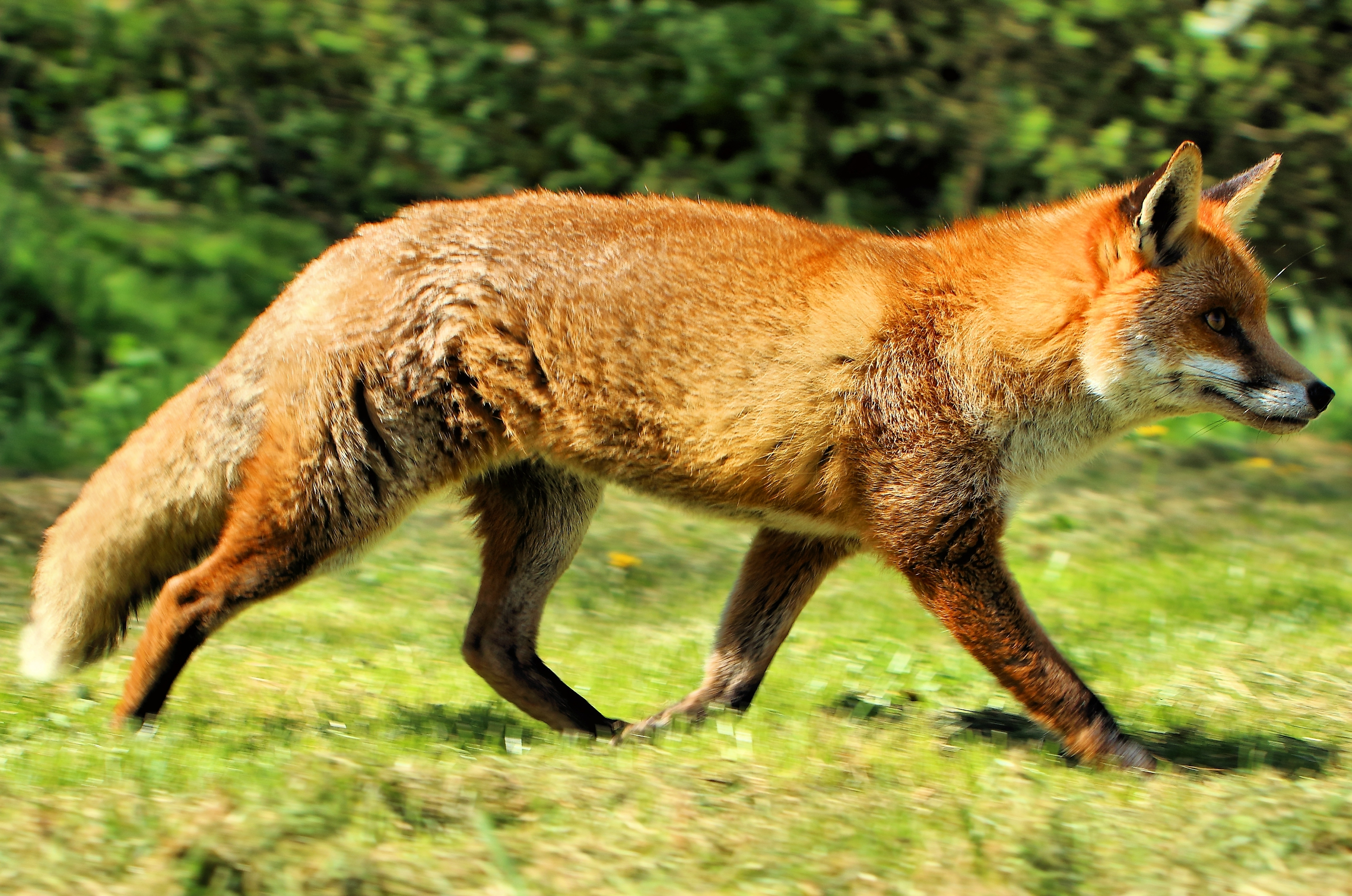
Red fox

England has a temperate oceanic climate in most areas, lacking extremes of cold or heat, but does have a few small areas of subarctic and warmer areas in the South West. Towards the North of England the climate becomes colder and most of England's mountains and high hills are located here and have a major impact on the climate and thus the local fauna of the areas. Deciduous woodlands are common across all of England and provide a great habitat for much of England's wildlife, but these give way in northern and upland areas of England to coniferous forests (mainly plantations) which also benefit certain forms of wildlife. The fauna of England has to cope with varying temperatures and conditions, although not extreme they do pose potential challenges and adaptational measures. English fauna has however had to cope with industrialisation, human population densities amongst the highest in Europe and intensive farming, but as England is a developed nation, wildlife and the countryside have entered the English mindset more and the country is very conscientious about preserving its wildlife, environment and countryside.

Some species have adapted to the expanded urban environment, particularly the red fox, which is the most successful urban mammal after the brown rat, and other animals such as common wood pigeon, both of which thrive in urban and suburban areas.

== Invertebrates ==
=== Molluscs ===
There are 220 species of non-marine molluscs that have been recorded as living in the wild in Britain and England. There are also 14 gastropod species that live only in greenhouses.

== Vertebrates ==
=== Amphibians ===
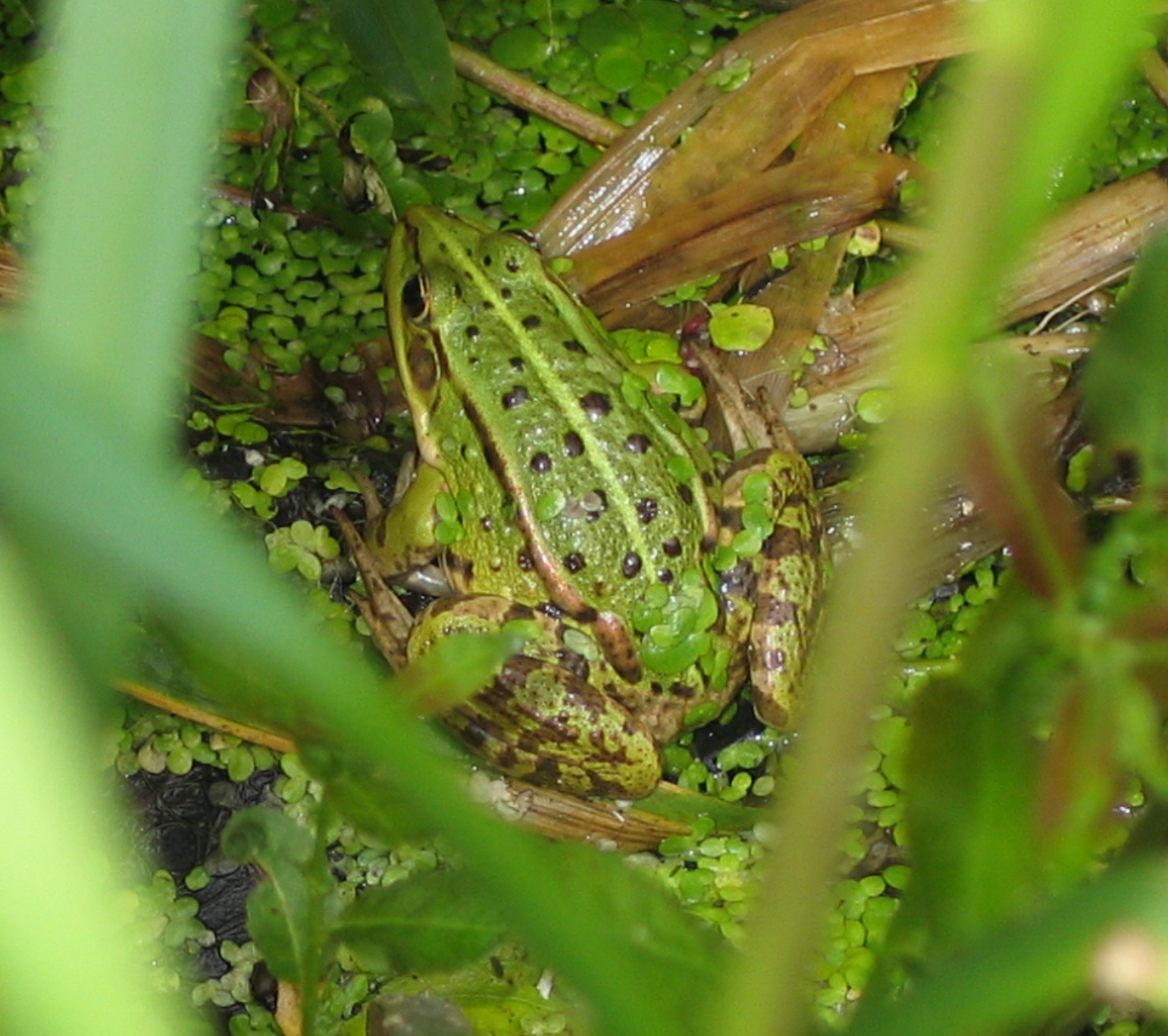
Pool frog

The species of amphibian native to England are the northern crested newt, smooth newt, palmate newt, common toad, natterjack toad, common frog and the pool frog. Several other species have become naturalised.

=== Reptiles ===
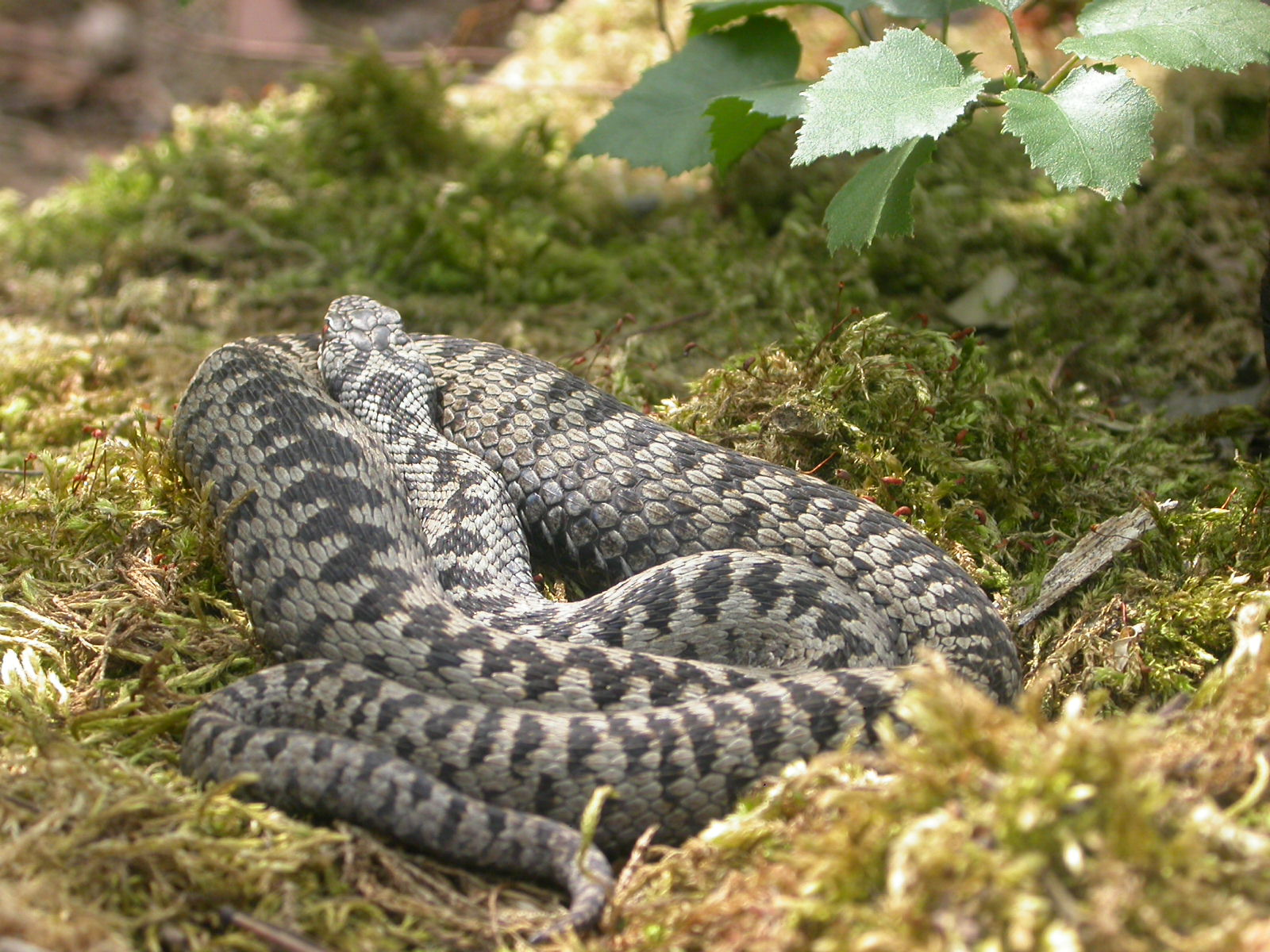
Adder

Four species of snake are, the European adder, grass snake, barred grass snake and smooth snake. Some introduced snakes are aesculapian snake and dice snakes.

Lizards found in England are slowworms, common lizards, sand lizards, European green lizards (introduced) and the common wall lizard (introduced from mainland Europe - found in the Isle of Wight.)

Turtles found off the English coast are the leatherback sea turtle, green sea turtle, hawksbill, loggerhead sea turtle, Kemp's ridley and appear to be visiting English waters in increasingly larger numbers as the seas around Britain warm due to climate change.

Terrapins found in England are the European pond terrapin (introduced from mainland Europe) and the red-eared terrapin (introduced, but not established).

=== Birds ===
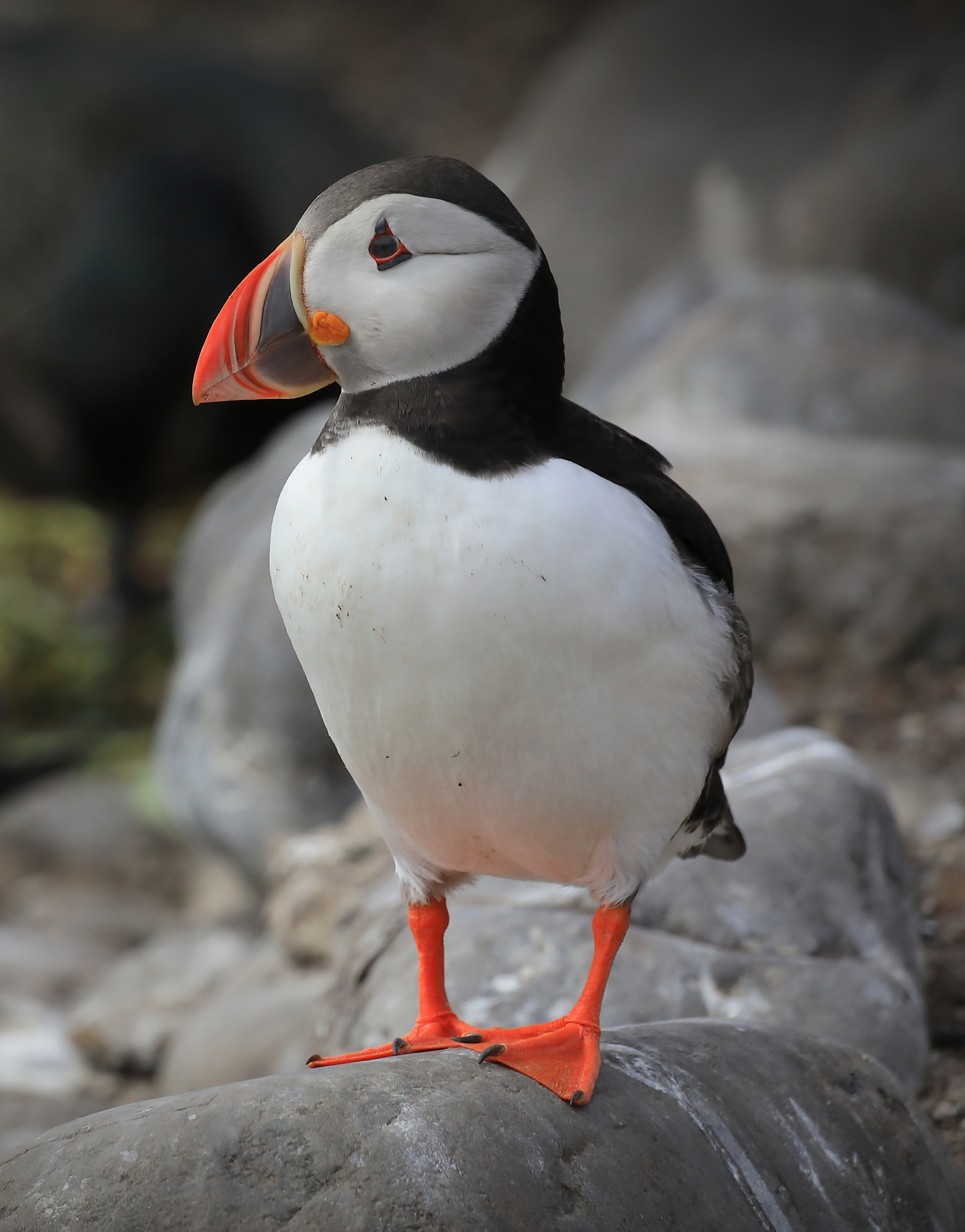
Atlantic puffins are found in some areas of the English coast.

English avifauna bears resemblances to that of continental Europe, consisting largely of Palaearctic species. Being located on an island, it has fewer breeding species than continental Europe, with some species, like the crested lark, breeding as close as northern France, yet unable to colonise Britain. However England and the British Isles as a whole do boast many wading and shorebirds and England's coastlines are very important habitats for seabirds. England's coastline being generally flatter and sandier than that of its neighbouring UK countries is mainly a magnet for wading birds, but it does have some more rocky areas suitable for birds such as Atlantic puffins.

The mild winters mean that many species that cannot cope with harsher conditions can winter in Britain, and also that there is a large influx of wintering birds from the continent or beyond and even as far as South Africa.

There are about 250 species regularly recorded in England, and another 300 that occur with varying degrees of rarity.

=== Mammals ===
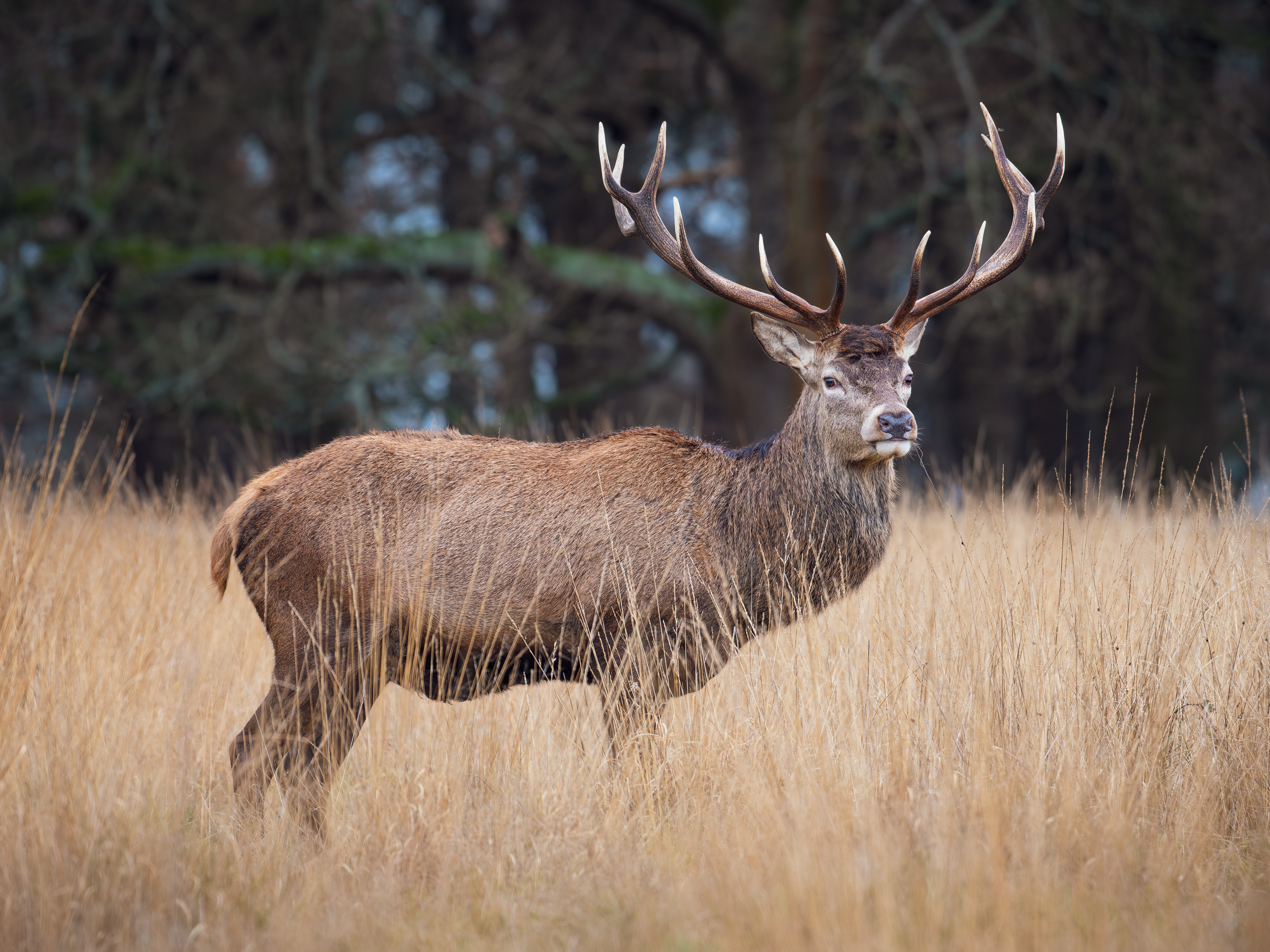
Red deer in Richmond Park, London

England boasts few large mammals, being mainly populated by smaller types. England has a few non-native species of deer which have become naturalized to the similar climate from areas of continental Europe and Southern Siberia and whilst the Scottish red deer thrives the most in Scotland, smaller species of deer, both native and introduced thrive in England, with some being absent (such as the Reeves's muntjac).

==== Insectivores and other small mammals ====
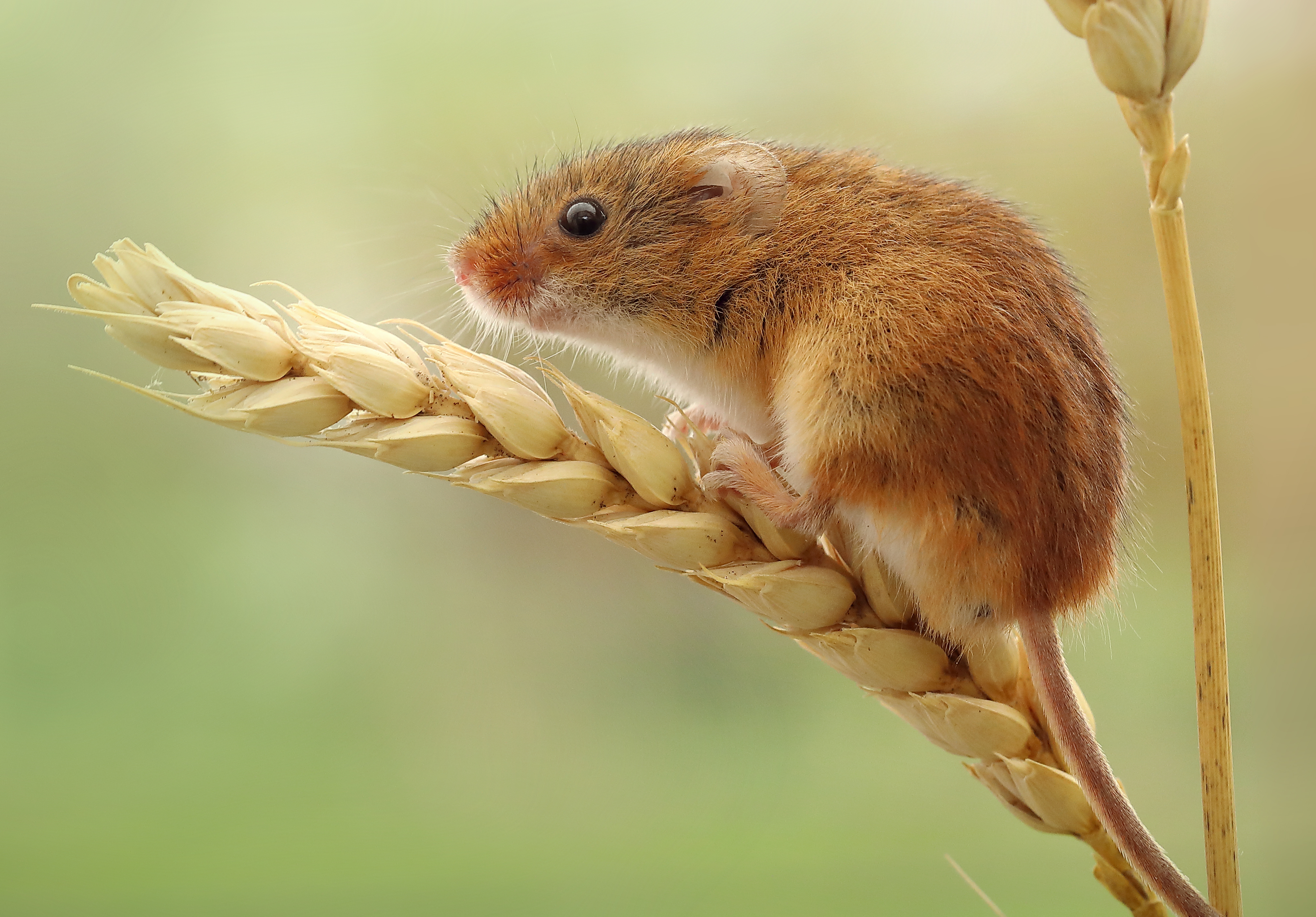
Eurasian harvest mouse

There are also several species of insectivore in England and the rest of Britain. The hedgehog is probably the most widely known as it is a regular visitor to urban gardens. It is also vulnerable to road traffic, and many are killed crossing busy motorways and dual carriageways. The mole is also widely recognised and its subterranean lifestyle causes much damage to garden lawns and some gardeners trap or kill them (although this is illegal).

Shrews are also fairly common, and the smallest, the pygmy shrew, is one of the smallest mammals in the world. There are also several species of bat found in England: the pipistrelle bat is the smallest and the most common of them all. Rodents are also numerous across Britain and England, particularly the brown rat which is by far the most abundant urban animal after humans. Some however, are becoming increasingly rare. Habitat destruction has led to a population decrease in the number of dormice and bank voles found in Britain.

Gray squirrels introduced from eastern America have forced the decline of the native red squirrel due to competition. Red squirrels are now confined to upland and coniferous-forested areas of England, mainly in the north, south west and Isle of Wight. England's climate is very suitable for lagomorphs and the country has European rabbits and brown hares which were introduced in Roman times. Mountain hares which are indigenous have now been re-introduced in Derbyshire.

==== Carnivores ====
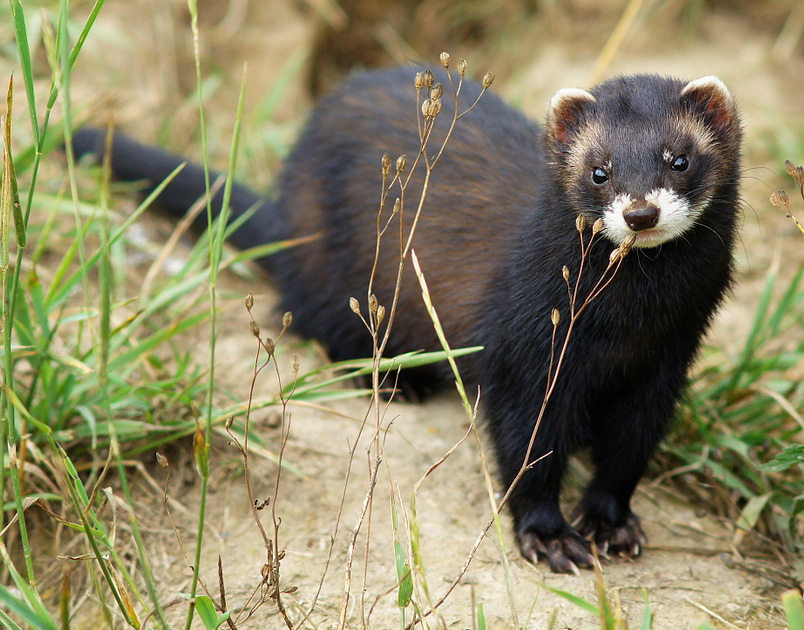
European polecat

There is a variety of carnivores, especially from the weasel family. These ranging in size from the weasel, stoat and European polecat (rare in England, mainly found in the Welsh Marches and heavily interbred with domestic ferrets) to the badger and pine marten, and the recently introduced mink and semiaquatic otter. There is an ongoing debate in England about whether badgers should be culled or vaccinated in order to reduce the spread of bovine tuberculosis. In the absence of the extinct wolf and brown bear, the largest carnivore is the red fox, the adaptability and opportunism of which has allowed it to proliferate in the urban environment. Weasels and foxes dominate the role of carnivores in England and are very common in the countryside and in towns and some cities.

==== Sea mammals ====
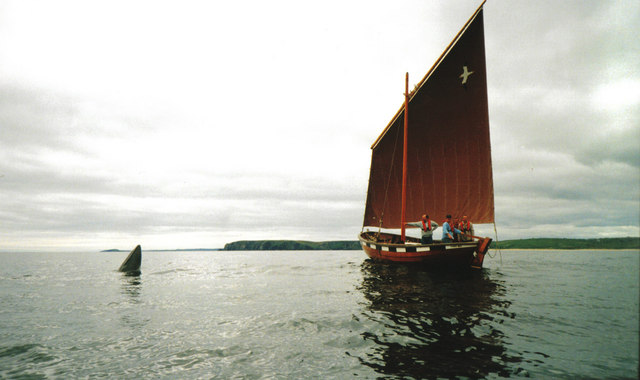
Minke whale and a boat in British waters

England's offshore waters are a haven for many sea mammals, including various types of whales, dolphins and seals. The grey seal although rare in other parts of the world is found in relatively large numbers along the English coast.

== See also ==
- Fauna of Wales
- Fauna of Scotland
- Fauna of Ireland
- Fauna of Europe
- Flora and fauna of the Outer Hebrides
- Flora and fauna of Cornwall
