= Biodiversity of the United Kingdom =

Biodiversity of the United Kingdom may refer to:

- Fauna of Great Britain
- Flora of Great Britain
- Biodiversity of British Overseas Territories
