= Phaiodotoxin =

Phaiodotoxin (PhTx1) is a toxin from the venom of Anuroctonus phaiodactylus, also known as the Mafia scorpion. It affects voltage-gated sodium ion channels leading to an increased duration of its opening.

== Sources ==
Phaiodotoxin is a peptide isolated from the venom of Anuroctonus phaiodactylus, a scorpion of the Iuridae family.

== Chemistry ==
Phaiodotoxin is a peptide of 72 amino acids residues with a molecular weight of 7971 Dalton. The peptide has four disulfide bridges that are located between Cys13 - Cys38, Cys23 - Cys50, Cys 27 - Cys52 and Cys63 - Cys71. The venom of Anuroctonus phaiodactylus also contains at least two closely related toxins, which have been named Phaiodotoxin-2 (PhTx2) and Phaiodotoxin-3 (PhTx3). Phaiodotoxin belongs to the long-chain subfamily of scorpion peptides. The amino acid sequence of phaiodotoxin suggests it is more closely related to α-scorpion toxins (30–49% similarity) than to β-scorpion toxins (21–38% similarity).

== Mode of action ==
Phaiodotoxin acts on voltage-dependent sodium ion channels of insects. It shifts the voltage dependent activation curve to more negative values. In addition, the steady-state inactivation curve is shifted to more positive potentials. As a result, smaller depolarizations are needed for the channel to open, and the channel will need larger depolarizations to inactivate. These two effects increase the so-called window current, a measure for the non-inactivating fraction of the sodium currents, by 225%. Phaiodotoxin thus combines the actions of α-scorpion toxins (slowed inactivation) and β-scorpion toxins (enhanced activation). This dual action may be explained by the homology of Phaiodotoxin to both types of scorpion toxins.

== Toxicity ==
Studies in different cell lines indicate that Phaiodotoxin does not affect mammalian sodium channels. Furthermore, there are no accidents of intoxication reported after stings of the Mafia scorpion, suggesting that phaiodotoxins are insect-specific. In crickets 0.8-1.0 μg of phaiodotoxin can result in flaccidity, impairment of movements, paralysis and death.
