= BGX =

BGX may refer to:

== Places ==
- Comandante Gustavo Kraemer Airport (IATA airport code BGX) Bagé, Brazil
- Bagri Sajjanpur (station code BGX), Rajasthan, India; see List of railway stations in India
- Baingoin County (region code BGX), Nagqu Prefecture, Tibet, China; see List of administrative divisions of the Tibet Autonomous Region

== Other uses ==
- Balkan Gagauz Turkish (ISO 639 language code bgx), a language found in the Balkans, spoken in European Turkiye
- Iuridae (Catalogue of Life code BGX), a taxonomic family of scorpion
- 493rd Bombardment Group (unit code BG-X), a WW2 USAAF unit
- The Thomper (aircraft code BG-X), a Boeing B-17, a member of the WW2 USAAF 334th Bombardment Squadron
- IBM 3486 model BGX, a twinax terminal; see IBM 5250

== See also ==
- BBG(X)
