= Calchas (scorpion) =

Scientific classification
- Domain: Eukaryota
- Kingdom: Animalia
- Phylum: Arthropoda
- Subphylum: Chelicerata
- Class: Arachnida
- Order: Scorpiones
- Family: Iuridae
- Genus: Calchas

Genus of scorpions

Calchas is a genus of scorpions in the family Iuridae. At least four species in Calchas are described.

== Species ==
- Calchas anlasi Yagmur, Soleglad, Fet & Kovarik, 2013
- Calchas birulai Fet, Soleglad & Kovarik, 2009
- Calchas kosswigi Yagmur, Soleglad, Fet & Kovarik, 2013
- Calchas nordmanni Birula, 1899
