= Iurus =

Scientific classification
- Domain: Eukaryota
- Kingdom: Animalia
- Phylum: Arthropoda
- Subphylum: Chelicerata
- Class: Arachnida
- Order: Scorpiones
- Family: Iuridae
- Genus: Iurus; Thorell, 1876

Genus of scorpions

Iurus is a genus of scorpions belonging to the family Iuridae.

The species of this genus are found in Eastern Mediterranean.

Species:

- Iurus dekanum (Roewer, 1943)
- Iurus dufoureius (Brullé, 1832)
- Iurus kinzelbachi Kovarik, Fet, Soleglad & Yagmur, 2010
