= Fauna of Europe =

Native animals of Europe

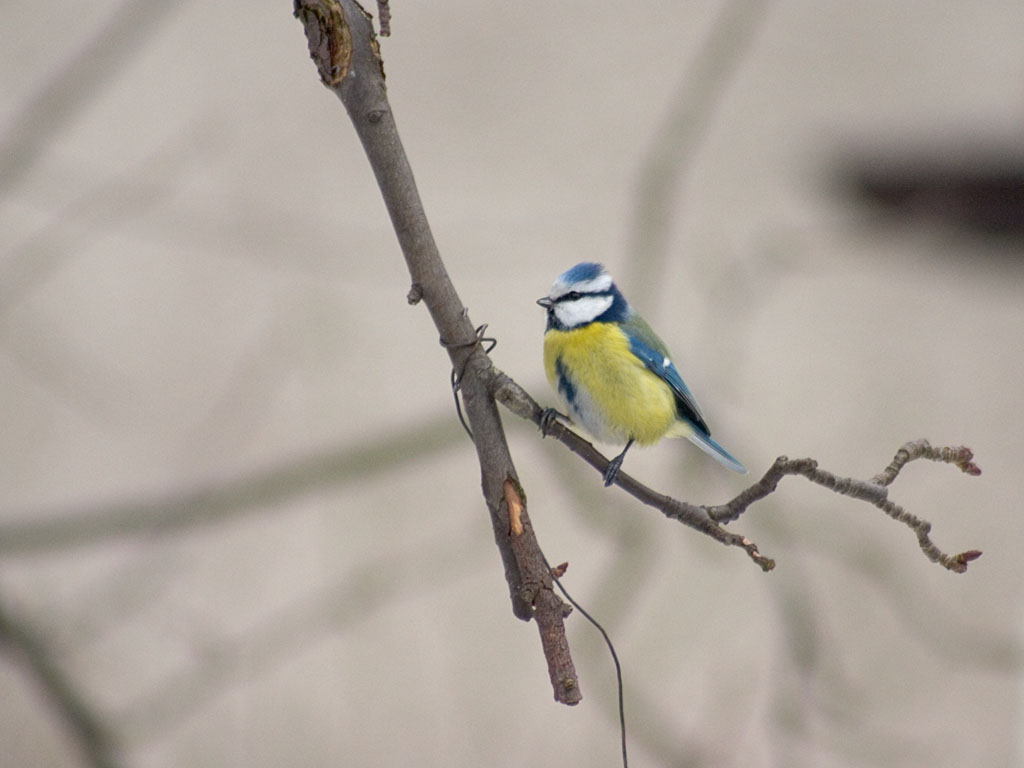
The blue tit is a widespread and common resident breeder of Europe

The fauna of Europe is all the animals living in Europe and its surrounding seas and islands. Europe is the western part of the Palearctic realm (which in turn is part of the Holarctic). Lying within the temperate region, (north of the equator) the wildlife is not as rich as in the hottest regions, but is nevertheless diverse due to the variety of habitats and the faunal richness of Eurasia as a whole.

Before the arrival of humans European fauna was more diverse and widespread than today. The European megafauna of today is much reduced from its former numbers. The Holocene extinction drastically reduced numbers and distribution of megafauna and continues to (such as with wolves and bears). Many of these species still exist in smaller numbers, while others thrive in the developed continent free from natural predators, with the former threatened by human activity (particularly megafaunal species).

== Origins of European fauna ==
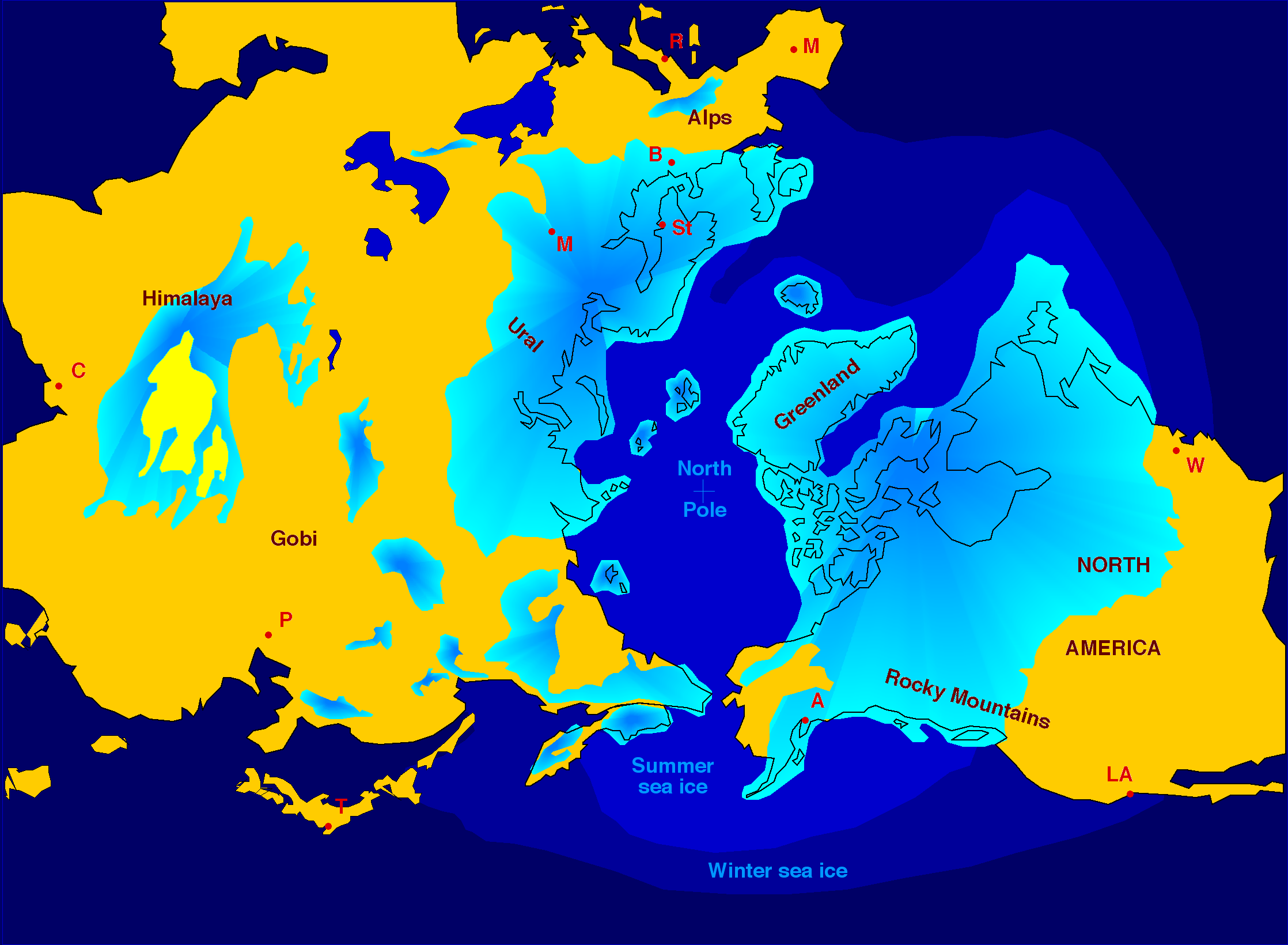
Northern Hemisphere glaciation during the last ice age

The formation of the European fauna began in the Mesozoic with the splitting of the Laurasian supercontinent and was eventually separated from both North America and Asia in the Eocene. During the early Cenozoic, the continents approached their present configuration, Europe experienced periods of land connection to North America via Greenland, resulting in colonization by North American animals. In these times, higher sea levels sometimes fragmented Europe into island subcontinents. As time passed, sea levels fell, with seas retreating from the plains of western Russia, establishing the modern connection to Asia (Priabonian). Asian animal species then colonized Europe in large numbers, and many endemic European lineages (e.g. primates) died out ("grande coupure").

The cyclic changes of the Pleistocene between cold and warm periods resulted in antagonistic responses within two different groups of organisms: one expanding during the warm periods and retracting during the cold phases and another with opposed responses (the latter group is composed of so-called arctic and alpine species).

Glaciation during the most recent ice age and the presence of man affected the distribution of European fauna. As for the animals, in many parts of Europe most large animals and top predator species have been hunted to extinction. The woolly mammoth was extinct before the end of the Neolithic period. Tree species spread outward from refugia during interglacial periods, but in varied patterns, with different trees dominating in different periods. Insects, on the other hand, shifted their ranges with the climate, maintaining consistency in species for the most part throughout the period (Coope 1994). Their high degree of mobility allowed them to move as the glaciers advanced or retreated, maintaining a constant habitat despite the climatic oscillations. Mammals recolonized at varying rates. Brown bears, for instance, moved quickly from refugia with the receding glaciers, becoming one of the first large mammals to recolonize the land. The last glacial period ended about 10,000 years ago, resulting in the present distribution of ecoregions.

See also List of extinct animals of Europe.

== Zoogeographic regions ==
Biogeographic regions of Europe (including Asian part of Turkey): the Arctic, Boreal, Atlantic, Continental, Alpine, Pannonian, Mediterranean, Macaronesian, Steppic, Black Sea and Anatolian regions

=== Atlantic Ocean ===
The north-eastern Atlantic Ocean may be divided into two main biogeographic regions - the Lusitanian (west of British Isles, Bay of Biscay, Iberian coast as far as Gibraltar), and northern European seas (including North Sea and Baltic Sea). A clearly distinct area is also the Macaronesian Biogeographic Region.

The North Sea is home to about 230 species of fish. Cod, haddock, whiting, saithe, plaice, sole, mackerel, herring, pouting, sprat, and sandeel are common and target of commercial fishing. Due to the various depths of the North Sea trenches and differences in salinity, temperature, and water movement some fish reside only in small areas of the North Sea (e.g. blue-mouth redfish, rabbitfish). Of crustaceans, Norway lobster, and deep-water prawns and brown shrimp are commercially fished. The coasts provide breeding habitat for dozens of bird species. Tens of millions of birds make use of the North Sea for breeding, feeding, or migratory stopovers every year. Populations of northern fulmars, black-legged kittiwakes, Atlantic puffins, northern gannets, razorbills, and a variety of species of petrels, seaducks, loons, cormorants, gulls, auks, and terns, and other seabirds make these coasts popular for birdwatching.

The Baltic Sea is an ecological island, isolated from other brackish seas by both land and fully marine seas. The low salinity of the Baltic Sea has led to the evolution of many slightly divergent species, such as the Baltic Sea herring, which is a smaller variant of the Atlantic herring. The most frequent benthic species are Saduria entomon and Monoporeia affinis, which is originally a freshwater species. A great part of its bottom is anoxic and without animal life.

The Baltic Sea and North Sea are also home to a variety of marine mammals (common seals, grey seals).

=== Freshwater ===
Europe contains several important freshwater ecoregions, including the heavily developed rivers of Europe, the rivers of Russia, which flow into the Arctic, Baltic, Black, and Caspian seas. There are about 15,000 known European freshwater animal species.

=== Arctic tundra ===
Arctic tundra is the northernmost (and coldest) of European habitats, in extreme northern Scandinavia, Svalbard archipelago, northernmost part of Russia. Some typical animals include reindeer, Arctic fox, brown bear, ermine, lemmings, partridges, snowy owl and many insects. Most tundra animals undergo hibernation during the colder season. Iceland is an island in the North Atlantic Ocean with very scarce land fauna. The only native land mammal when humans arrived was the Arctic fox. There are no native reptiles or amphibians on the island, but a rich marine fauna live in the ocean waters around it.

Percentage of land area of different European countries covered by forest.

=== Forests ===
Eighty to ninety per cent of Europe was once covered by forest. It stretched from the Mediterranean Sea to the Arctic Ocean. Though over half of Europe's original forests disappeared through the centuries of deforestation, Europe still has over one quarter of its land area as forest, such as the boreal forests of Scandinavia and Russia, mixed rainforests of the Caucasus and the cork oak forests in the western Mediterranean. In temperate Europe, mixed forest with both broadleaf and coniferous trees dominate. The cutting down of the pre-agricultural forest habitat has caused major disruptions to the original animal ecosystems, and only few corners of mainland Europe have not been grazed by livestock at some point in time.

=== Grasslands ===
The Eurasian Steppe is the term often used to describe the vast steppe ecoregion of Eurasia stretching from the western borders of the steppes of Hungary to the eastern border of the steppes of Mongolia. Most of the Euro-Asian Steppe is included within the region of Central Asia while only a small part of it is included within Eastern Europe (the steppes of western Russia, Ukraine and Pannonian Plain - see Pontic–Caspian steppe). Characteristic are some small mammals (golden jackal, voles, European ground squirrel, Russian desman among others).

=== Alpine regions ===
The mountain regions have peculiar fauna relatively little influenced by human activities. The northernmost are the Scandinavian Mountains. Pyrenees present many instances of endemism. The Pyrenean desman is found only in some of the streams of the northern slopes of these mountains, Pyrenean brook salamander also lives in streams and lakes located at high altitudes. Among the other peculiarities of the Pyrenean fauna are blind insects in the caverns of Ariège (Anophthalmus, Adelops). The Pyrenean ibex mysteriously became extinct in 2000; the native Pyrenean brown bear was hunted to near-extinction in the 1990s but was re-introduced in 1996. Some common animals of the Alps are Alpine ibex, Alpine marmot, Tengmalm's owl and ptarmigan. The Apennine Mountains provide habitat to Marsican brown bear and the Italian wolf. The Carpathian Mountains are a range of mountains forming an arc of roughly 1,500 km across Central and Eastern Europe and are inhabited by the largest populations in Europe of brown bears, wolves and lynxes, as well as chamois and other animals.

=== Mediterranean ===
Formerly the region was mostly covered with forests and woodlands, but heavy human use has reduced much of the region to the sclerophyll shrublands known as chaparral, matorral, maquis, or garrigue. The loss of native forests had significant impact on biodiversity, with some 90% of the endemic mammalian genera of the Mediterranean becoming extinct after the development of agriculture. Conservation International has designated the Mediterranean basin as one of the world's biodiversity hotspots.

As to the marine fauna, there are strong affinities and relationships between Mediterranean and Atlantic faunas. The deep-water fauna of the Mediterranean has no distinctive characteristics and is relatively poor. Both are a result of events after the Messinian salinity crisis. An invasion of Indian Ocean species has begun via the Suez Canal (see Lessepsian migration). Many species, (such as the Mediterranean monk seal) are critically endangered.

== Invertebrates ==
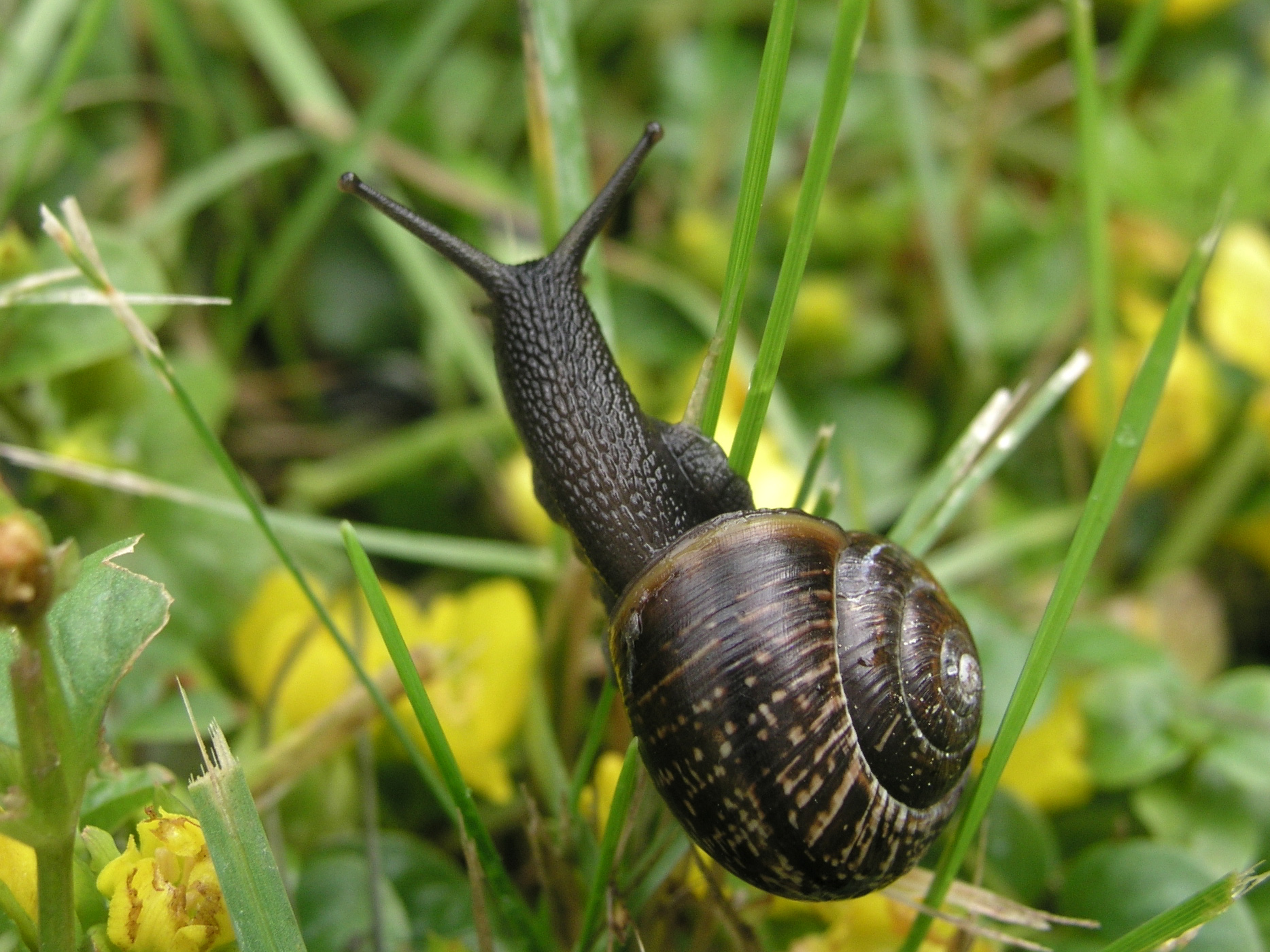
Arianta arbustorum, a widespread land snail

About 100,000 invertebrate species (including insects) are known from Europe. The marine species richness is greatest in the Mediterranean with 600 sponge species (45% of them endemic), 143 known species of Echinoderms and about 500 species of Cnidarians. Almost 1000 species of oligochaetes live in Europe.

There are about 1500 species of non-marine molluscs in Europe. The marine fauna is again richest in the Mediterranean region (2000 marine mollusc species). 22 species and 3 subspecies of gastropods are extinct in Europe since the year 1500. No species of bivalves are known to be extinct in Europe since 1500.

The myriapod fauna contains 500 Chilopoda and 1500 Diplopoda. Of crustaceans, about 900 species of Maxillopods, 400 Ostracods, 1500 species of Isopods, 500 Amphipods and 30 Decapods (e.g. European crayfish) and many others are present. The number of spider species in Europe counts to 4113. Scorpions are mainly found in southern parts of Europe (Euscorpius, Belisarius, Iurus).

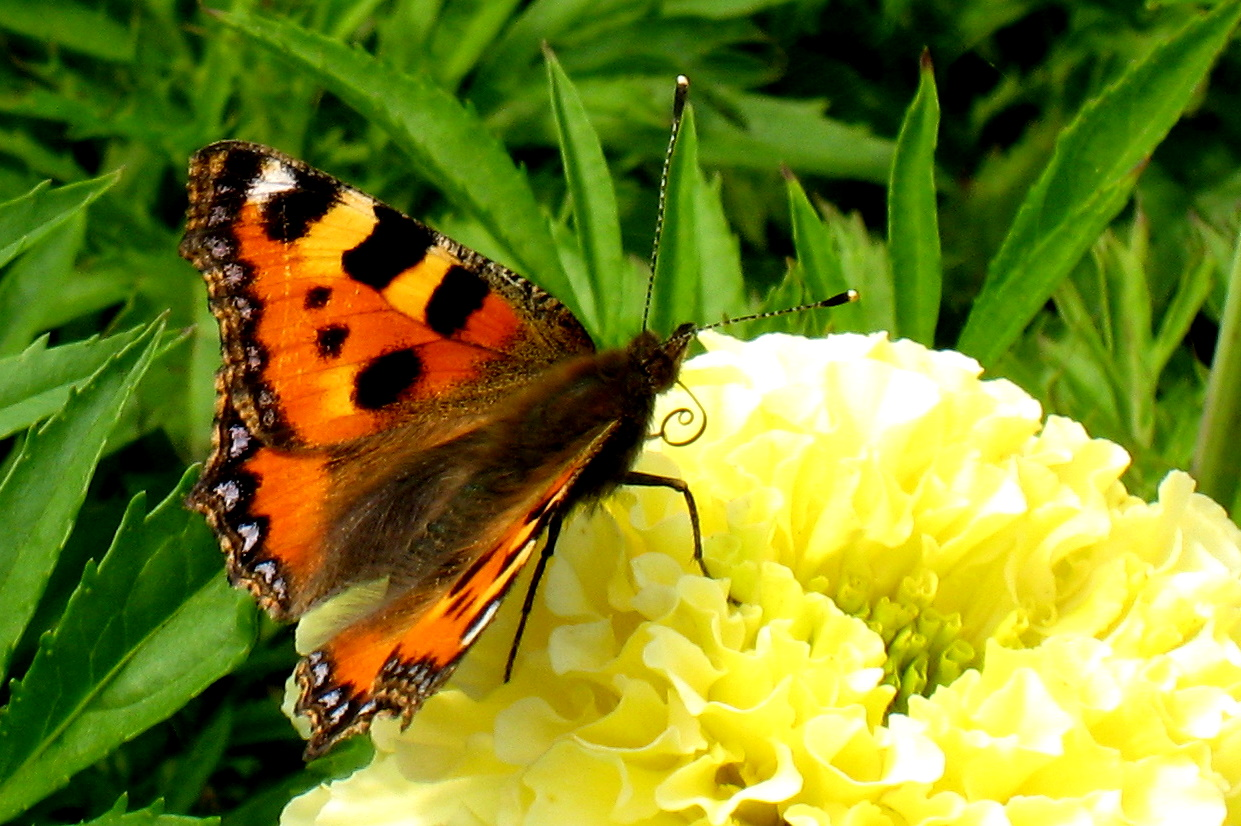
Small tortoiseshell

=== Insects ===
There are about 300 Neuropteran, over 1000 Orthopteran, 150 cockroach and 1000 caddisfly species in Europe. The dipteran fauna consists of 12,000 species of Brachycera and 7000 species of Nematocera. Among over 20,000 Hymenopterans are 180 species of ants. About 25,000 species of beetles are recorded from Europe (including about 2600 ground beetles, 700 longhorn beetles, 1700 leaf beetles, 200 ladybird beetles, 5000 rove beetles and 5000 weevils).

About 600 species of butterflies and about 8000 species of moths live in Europe. An estimated 18% of all European butterfly species are considered to be vulnerable to or imminently faced with extinction.

== Fish ==
Europe has 344 fresh-water fish species, about 200 of them endemic. Some 277 fish species have been introduced to Europe, and over one-third of Europe's current fish fauna is composed of introduced species, whereas more than a third of Europe's freshwater fish species are at risk of extinction, according to new data released by the World Conservation Union (IUCN). Jawless fishes include brook lamprey, river lamprey, sea lamprey. Sharks and skates are uncommon in European waters. Sturgeons are most diverse in eastern Europe. The common bony fishes include herrings (shads, European sprat, Atlantic herring, European anchovy), eels (European conger, European eel, Mediterranean moray), carps (barbel, bitterling, bleak, roach, chub, common dace, Eurasian minnow, gudgeons, rudd, stone loach, spined loach, tench, the Scandinavian tench also known as bakkleburg are the largest in Europe. silver- and carp bream and others - more than 50% of the freshwater fish species belong to this order). Another diverse group are the Perciformes (European perch, zander, ruffe, sand goby). Other common freshwater fish include catfishes (Wels catfish and less common Aristotle's catfish), the northern pike, burbot, and others.

== Amphibians ==
There live 75 species of amphibians in Europe, 56 of them endemic. Amphibian fauna is richest in southern Europe. Several ranids (common frog, moor frog, marsh frog, pool frog, agile frog), bufonids (common toad, natterjack toad, European green toad), hylids (European tree frog, Mediterranean tree frog) and a few pelobatids (common spadefoot), midwife toads and bombinatorids (yellow-bellied toad, European fire-bellied toad) discoglossids (e.g. common midwife toad, 10 Mediterranean species) live in Europe. For a complete list, see List of European amphibians.

== Reptiles ==
European green lizard

The European snakes include colubrids (grass snakes, smooth snake, western whip snake, garter snake, Aesculapian snake), many viperids (European adder, blunt-nosed viper, Lataste's viper, Ursini's viper, asp viper) and some typhlopids (Typhlops) and boas (javelin sand boa). Some widespread lizards include the sand lizard, European green lizard, western green lizard, viviparous lizard, common wall lizard, Iberian wall lizard, Italian wall lizard and others. The gekkos are confined to southern Europe (Moorish gecko, Mediterranean house gecko)

Among the seven species of native turtles, the most widespread are the European pond terrapin, marginated tortoise and Greek tortoise.

== Birds ==
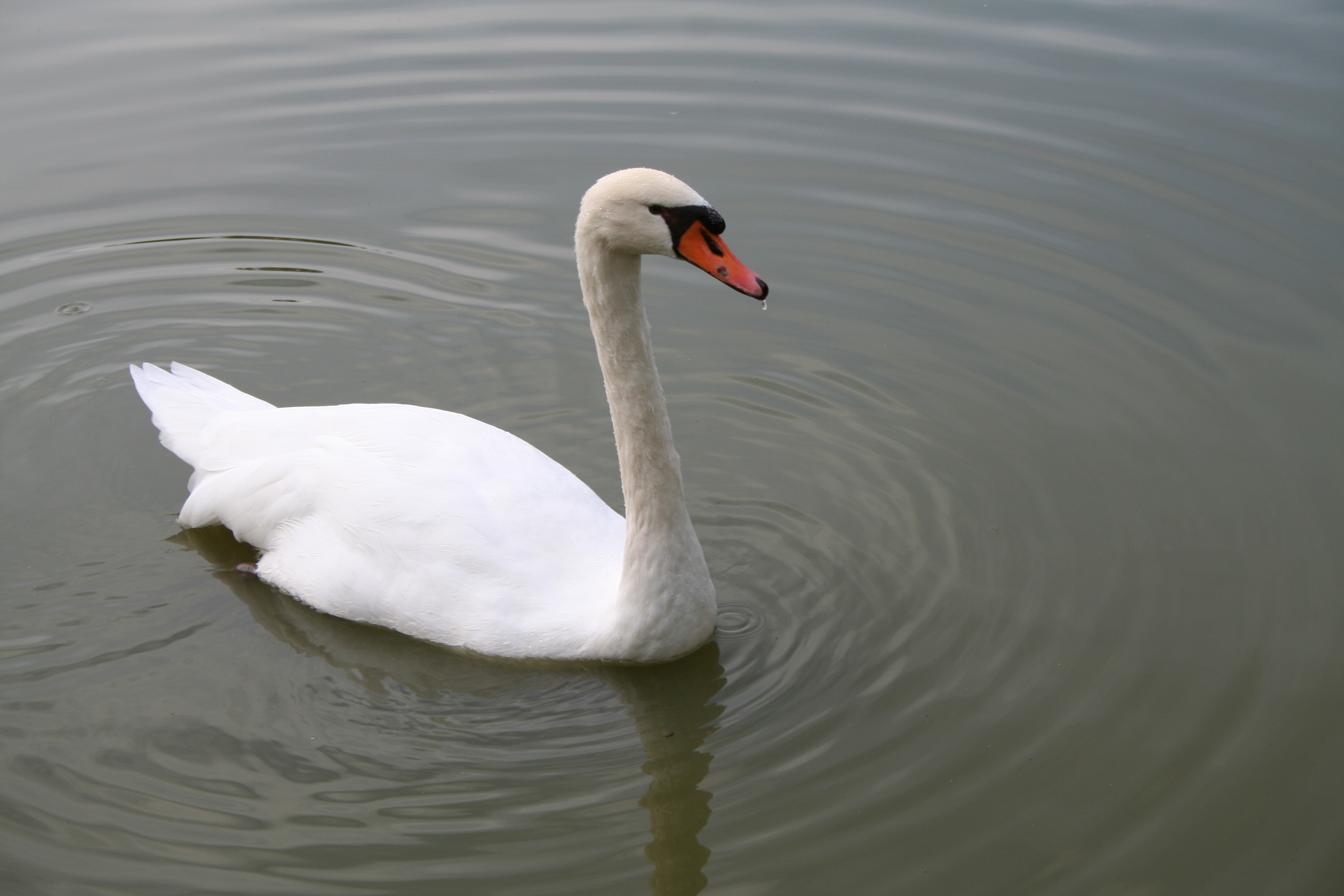
Mute swan

The list of European birds is about 800 species long (445 of them breeding in Europe). One bird family, the accentors (Prunellidae) is endemic to the Palaearctic region. The Holarctic has four other endemic bird families: the divers or loons (Gaviidae), grouse (Tetraoninae), auks (Alcidae), and waxwings (Bombycillidae). Besides these, European fauna contains nine species of geese, (Anser, Branta), many ducks (mallard, common teal, tufted duck), Ciconiidae (white stork, black stork), Ardeidae (bittern, little bittern, little egret, grey heron, purple heron, night heron), birds of prey (widespread osprey, white-tailed eagle, golden eagle, short-toed eagle, lesser spotted eagle, buzzards, northern goshawk, sparrowhawk, red kite, black kite, marsh harrier, hen harrier, peregrine falcon, common kestrel and Eurasian hobby, merlin; lesser kestrel, imperial eagle, booted eagle and vultures in southern Europe). The owls include tawny owl, eagle owl, barn owl, little owl, short-eared owl, long-eared owl. The more common European woodpeckers are great spotted woodpecker, middle spotted woodpecker, grey-headed woodpecker, European green woodpecker and black woodpecker. Some typical European shorebirds are the oystercatcher, many species of plovers, Eurasian woodcock, common snipe, jack snipe, Eurasian curlew, common sandpiper, redshank and northern lapwing.

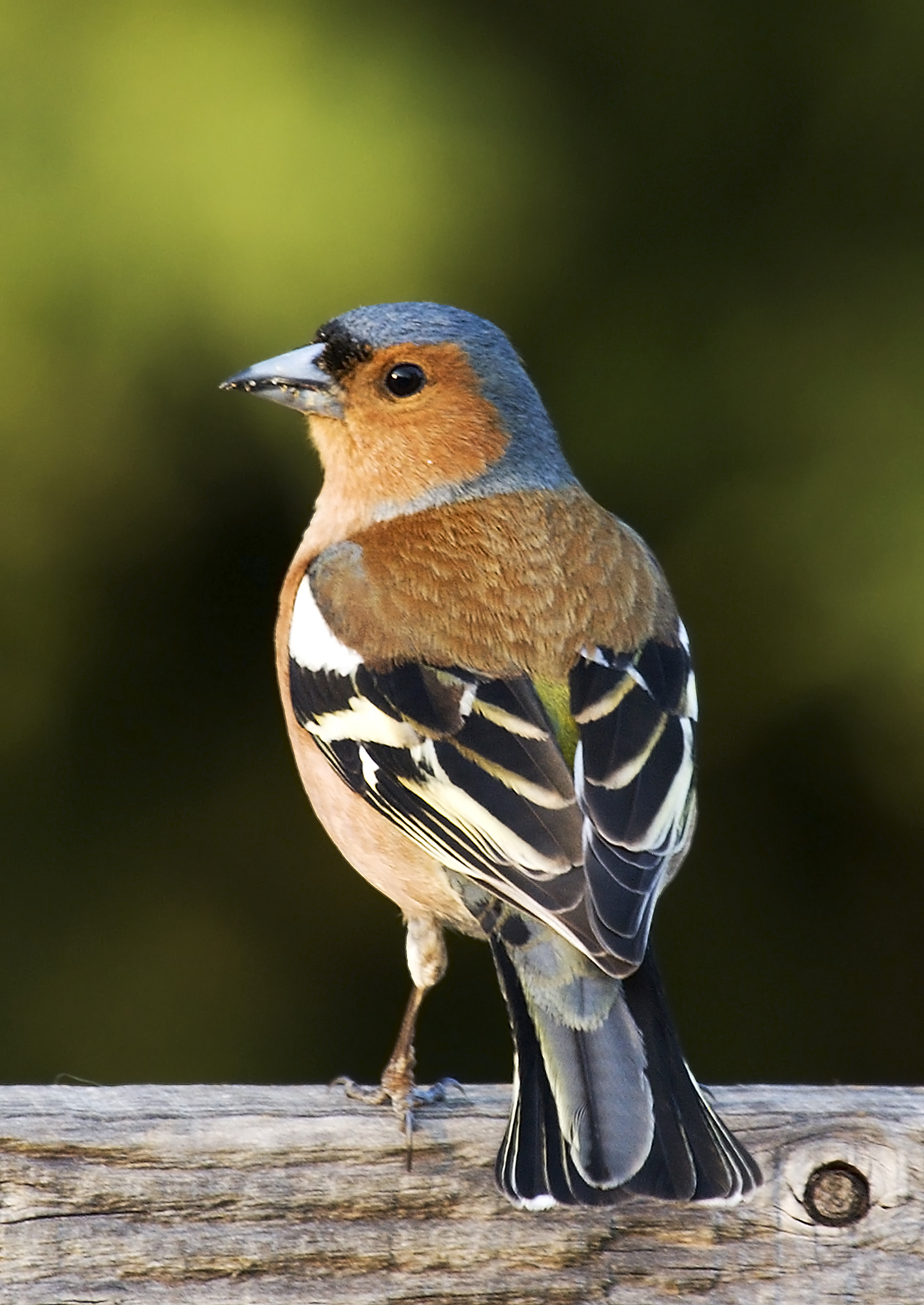
A male common chaffinch

About half of the European birds are passerines of the songbirds suborder. The more common of these include larks (skylark, crested lark, woodlark), swallows (barn swallow, sand martin, house martin), Motacillidae (tree pipit, meadow pipit, white wagtail, yellow wagtail), shrikes (red-backed shrike, great grey shrike), golden oriole, European starling, crows (magpie, jackdaw, hooded crow, rook, Eurasian jay), white-throated dipper, dunnock, Eurasian wren, Eurasian nuthatch, goldcrest, several warblers (reed warbler, sedge warbler, great reed-warbler, icterine warbler, Cetti's warbler, garden warbler, blackcap, whitethroat, chiffchaff), Old World flycatchers (pied flycatcher, spotted flycatcher, northern wheatear, whinchat, European stonechat), finches (common chaffinch, goldfinch, siskin, Eurasian bullfinch, greenfinch, common crossbill, linnet), sparrows (house sparrow, tree sparrow), buntings, (corn bunting, ortolan bunting, reed bunting, yellowhammer), tits (great tit, blue tit, coal tit).

Of the 589 species of birds (excluding seabirds) that breed in the Palearctic, 40% spend the winter elsewhere. Of those species that leave for the winter, 98% travel south to Africa.

== Mammals ==
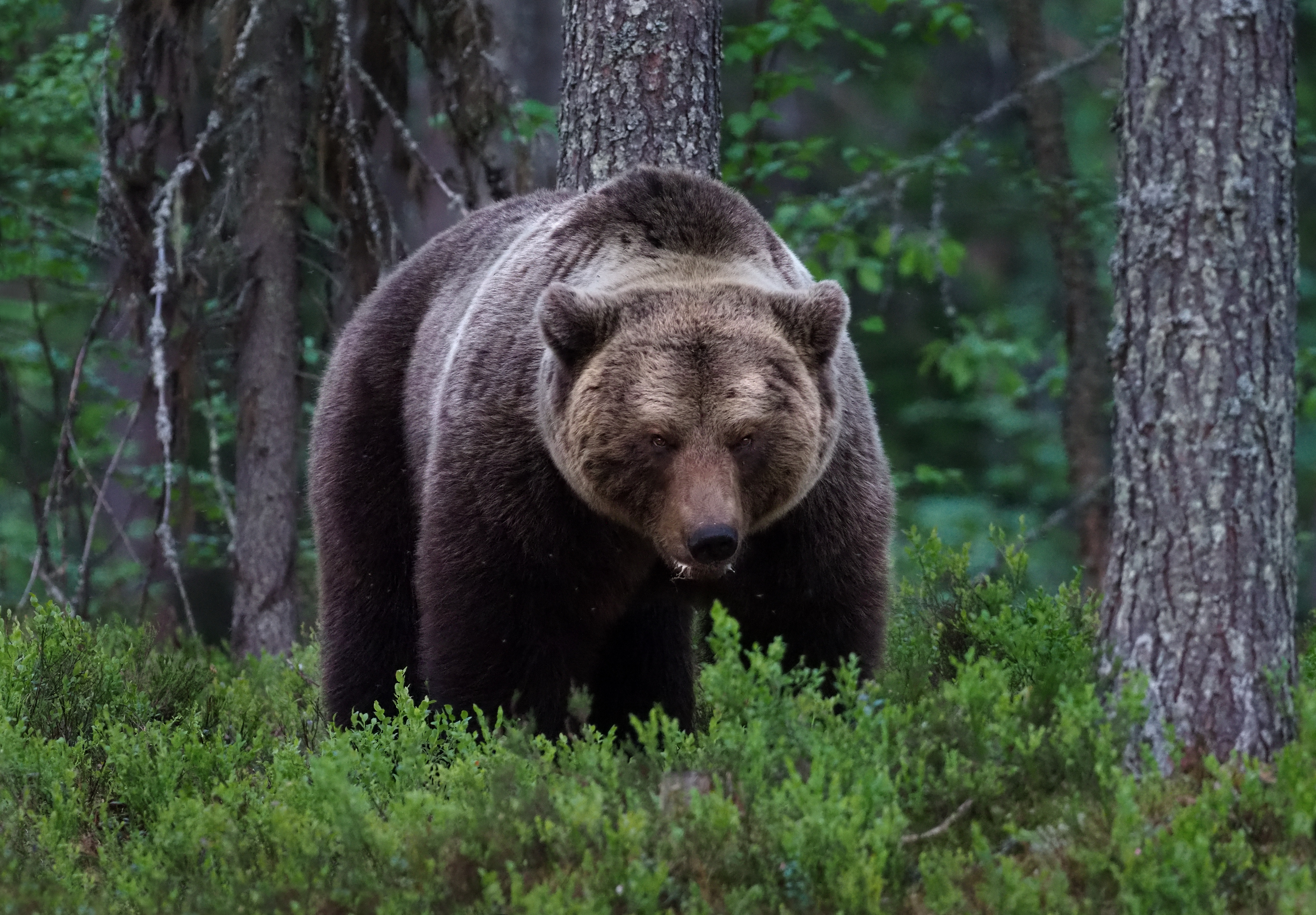
A brown bear photographed near the Russian border in the forests of Kainuu, Finland.

European mammal fauna consists of 270 species, 78 of them endemic to Europe (15% of them are threatened with extinction and 27% have been identified as declining). There are no endemic mammal orders in the region.

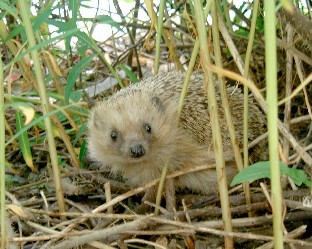
West European hedgehog

There live about 25 species insectivores in Europe (European hedgehog, southern white-breasted hedgehog, common shrew, Eurasian pygmy shrew, European mole, blind mole, Eurasian water shrew). Of the 35 European bats, the most widespread are the greater horseshoe bat, lesser horseshoe bat, Mediterranean horseshoe bat, greater mouse-eared bat, lesser mouse-eared bat, Bechstein's bat, Natterer's bat, whiskered bat, Daubenton's bat, brown long-eared bat, grey long-eared bat, barbastelle, serotine bat, parti-coloured bat, common pipistrelle, Nathusius' pipistrelle, lesser noctule and common noctule. The rodents include several voles (common vole, field vole, European pine vole etc.), harvest mice, hazel dormouse, garden dormouse, edible dormouse, red squirrel, striped field mouse, wood mouse, yellow-necked mouse, black rat, brown rat, house mouse, water vole, Cricetus. The European beaver was hunted almost to extinction, but is now being re-introduced throughout the continent. The three European lagomorphs are the European rabbit, mountain hare and European hare.

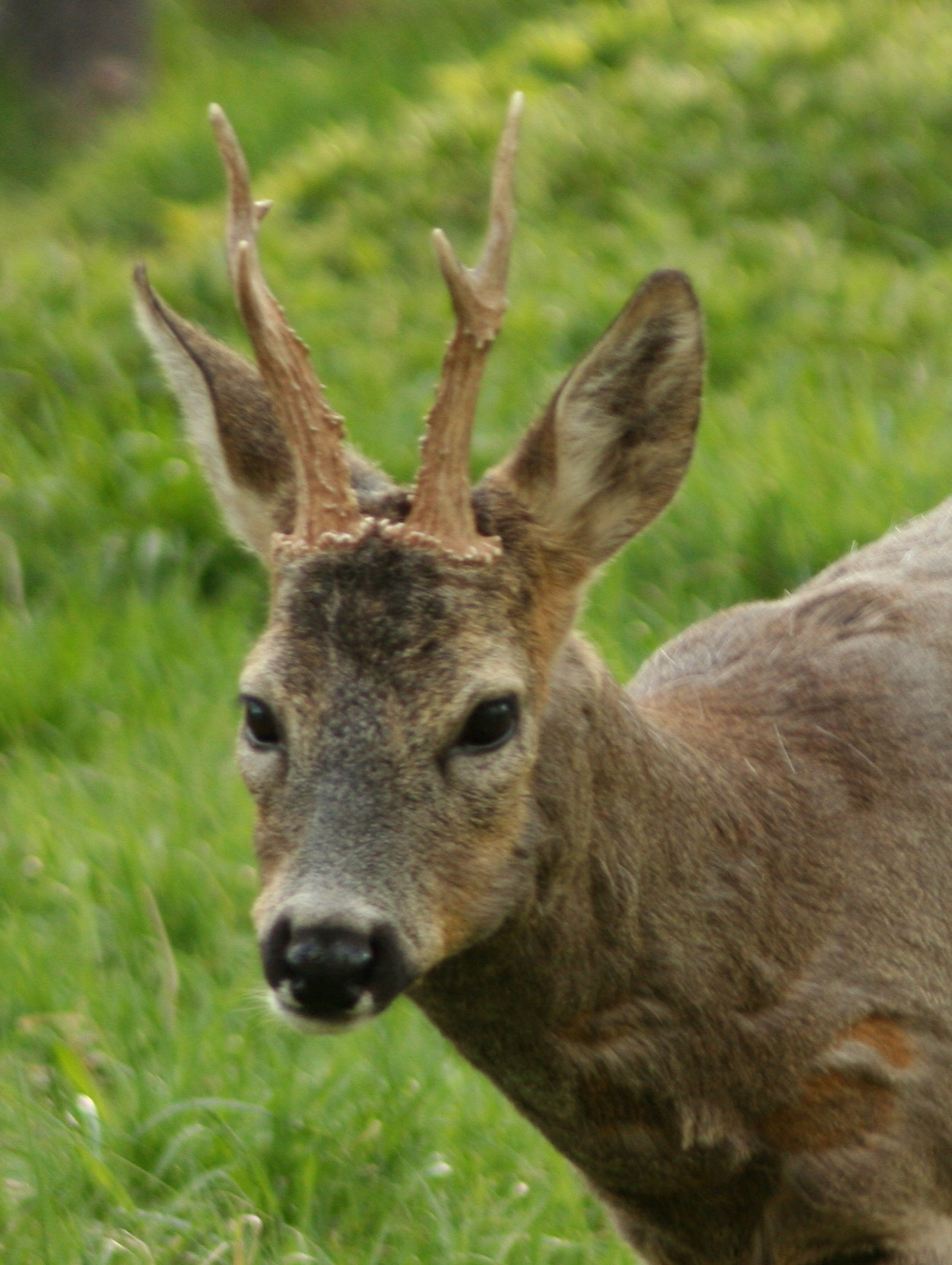
Roe deer, a common European ungulate

Widespread and locally common ungulates are boar, moose, roe deer, red deer, reindeer, wisent, chamois and argali. Today the larger carnivores (wolves and bears) are endangered. The brown bear lives primarily in the Balkan peninsula, Scandinavia and Russia; a small number also persist in other countries across Europe (Austria, Pyrenees etc.). In addition, wolverine is found in the Scandinavian Mountains and polar bears may be found on Svalbard. The Eurasian wolf, the second largest predator in Europe after the bear, can be found primarily in Eastern Europe and in the Balkans, with various packs in pockets of Western Europe (Scandinavia, Spain, etc.). The Italian wolf is a distinct sub-species of wolf found in the Italian Peninsula, especially amongst the Apennines. Other important European carnivores are Eurasian lynx, Iberian lynx (a distinct, yet critically endangered species), European wild cat, foxes (especially the red fox), European jackal, stoat, Eurasian otter, European mink, Eurasian badger and different species of martens. The only primate species (besides humans) is the re-introduced Barbary macaque; moreover, in prehistory this primate was more widely distributed in southern Europe.

== Human impact and conservation ==
Having lived side by side with agricultural peoples for millennia, Europe's animals have been profoundly affected by the presence and activities of man. The main causes of biodiversity loss are changes in natural habitats due to intensive agricultural production, construction and extractive industries, over exploitation of habitats and invasions and introductions of alien species.

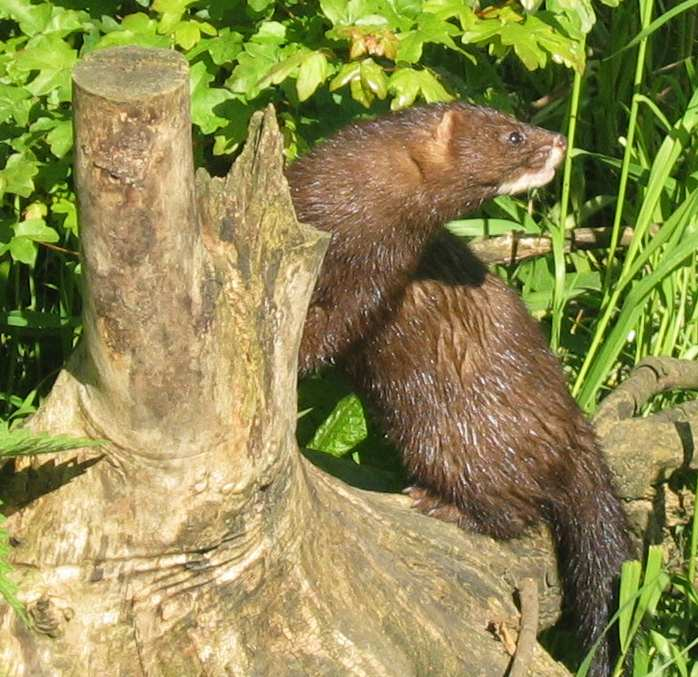
European mink is now extinct in the major part of its range due to the introduction of American mink.

With the exception of Fennoscandia and northern Russia, few areas of untouched wilderness are currently found in Europe, except for various national parks. There are over 26,000 protected areas in the European Union covering a total area of around 850.000 km^{2} (more than 20% of total EU territory; see also Natura 2000). 15% of the Alps are protected in parks and reserves, as well as many areas in the Carpathians (Retezat National Park). The coasts of the North Sea are home to nature reserves including the Ythan Estuary, Fowlsheugh Nature Preserve, and Farne Islands in the UK and The Wadden Sea National Parks in Germany. Białowieża Forest is the only remaining part of the immense forest which once spread across the European Plain. The Danube Delta is the second largest delta in Europe, (after the Volga Delta) and the best preserved on the continent. The Camargue Nature Reserve is another important delta nature reserve. Doñana National Park is a national park and wildlife refuge in southwestern Spain.

Biodiversity is protected in Europe through the Bern Convention, which has been signed by the European Community as well as non-European states. The European Union has adopted the ambitious target of halting the loss of biodiversity by 2010.

== See also ==
- Palearctic realm
- Fauna of Asia
- Fauna of Africa
- Fauna of Australia
- Fauna Europaea
