= Flora and fauna of the Outer Hebrides =

Plants and wildlife of Scottish island chain

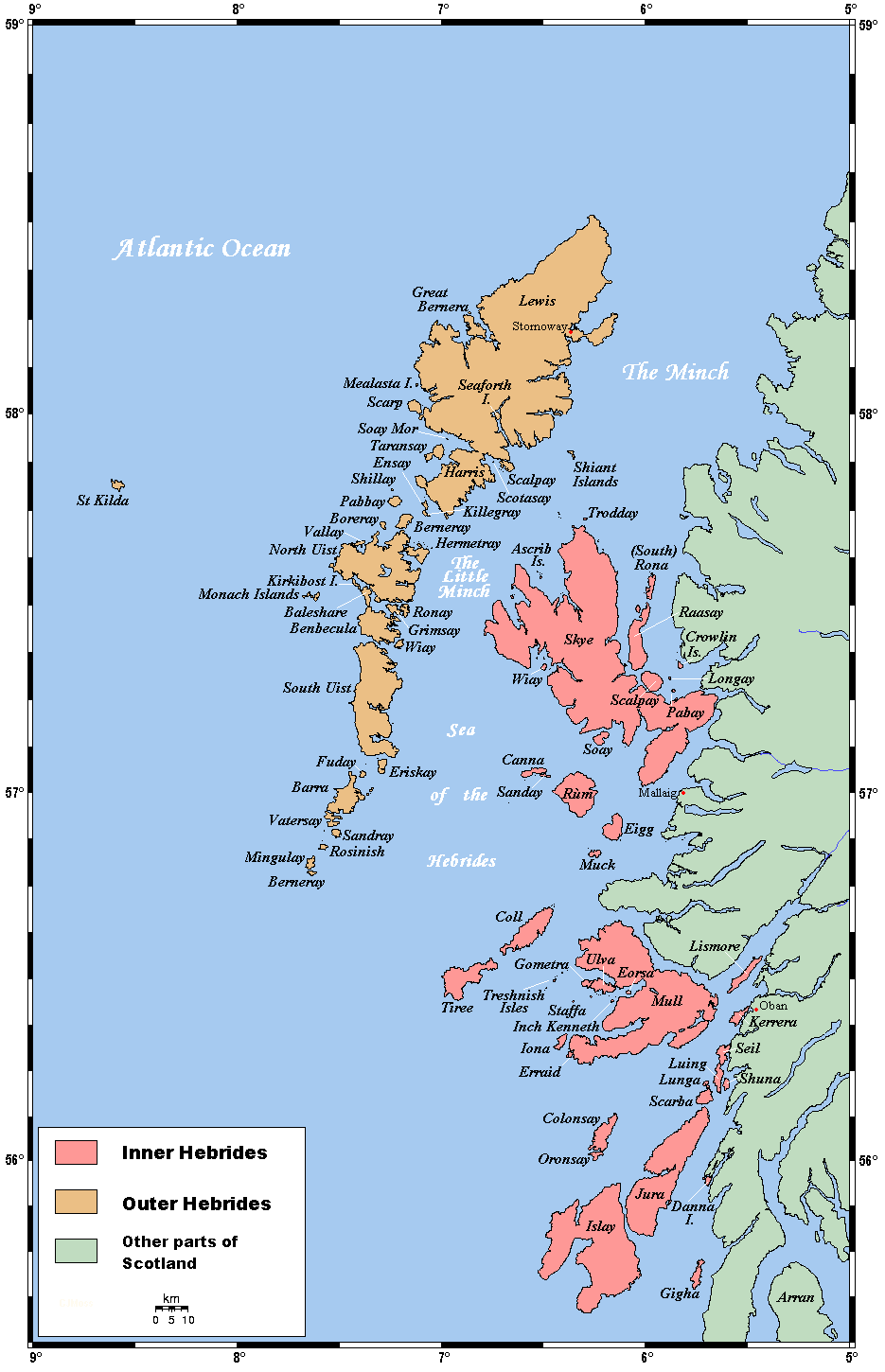
The Hebrides (Outer Hebrides in orange)

The flora and fauna of the Outer Hebrides in northwest Scotland comprises a unique and diverse ecosystem. A long archipelago, set on the eastern shores of the Atlantic Ocean, it attracts a wide variety of seabirds, and thanks to the Gulf Stream a climate more mild than might be expected at this latitude. Because it is on the Gulf Stream, it also occasionally gets exotic visitors.

== Wildlife ==
=== Birds ===
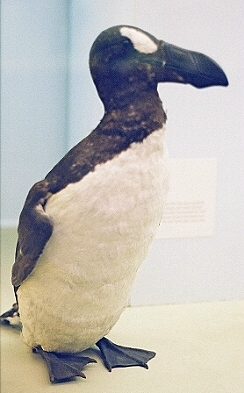
Mounted great auk, Natural History Museum, London. One of the last surviving specimens was killed on Stac an Armin in St Kilda

Three hundred and twenty-seven species of birds have been recorded in the Western Isles and more than 100 breed. The islands provide a natural flyway for migrating landbirds to and from their Arctic breeding grounds and a refuge for windblown vagrants from America and northern Europe. Many species of bird breed in the Western Isles and the surrounding islands, including, most of Britain's corncrakes which breed on the croftlands of all the islands.

Many species of seabirds inhabit the coastal areas of the islands, such as shag, northern gannets, northern fulmars, kittiwakes, guillemots and multiple species of gull.

In the Uig hills in Lewis, it is possible to spot golden eagles; it has also been claimed that white-tailed eagles have been seen in the area. In the Pairc area, it is possible to see feeding Eurasian oystercatchers and Eurasian curlews.

A few pairs of peregrine falcons survive on coastal cliffs and merlin and common buzzard are not uncommon anywhere on hill and moor. Red-throated divers nest on countless small tarns and a few black-throated divers can be found on bigger lochs. Arctic skuas are spreading south from Lewis as far as South Uist but the great skua is still found breeding only in Lewis, St Kilda, North Rona, the Shiant Isles and Barra Head.

An important feature of the winter bird life is the great diversity of wildfowl. A variety of duck, such as common eider and long-tailed duck are found in the shallow water around Lewis.

Great Bernera hosts numerous seabird species, including gulls, waders and ducks such as goldeneye. More unusually, a jack snipe was observed on the island in 2007.

The Shiant Isles have a large population of seabirds, including tens of thousands Atlantic puffins breeding in burrows on the slopes of Garbh Eilean, as well as significant numbers of common guillemots, razorbills, northern fulmars, black-legged kittiwakes, common shags, gulls and great skuas. Although St Kilda has more puffins, the sheer density on the Shiants is greater.

==== Berneray (North Uist) ====
The crofting practises on Berneray encourage a wide array of birdlife. On early summer evenings, you can sometimes hear snipe drumming and even the rasp of a corncrake. Mute swans can be seen on Loch Brusda, and greylag geese are common. In the winter they are joined by barnacle, and a few brent geese. Ravens and buzzards are often to be seen. Golden eagles and hen harriers are rarer sights, usually in the winter. Wading birds on the shore include redshanks, sanderlings, turnstones, oyster catchers, dunlin, curlews, whimbrels, ringed plovers and herons. Further out, around the shores of Berneray, are mallards, eiders, red-breasted mergansers, and, more rarely, black-throated and great northern divers. Shags and cormorants fish in the seas around Berneray throughout the year, and in summer you can see gannets diving.

==== St Kilda ====
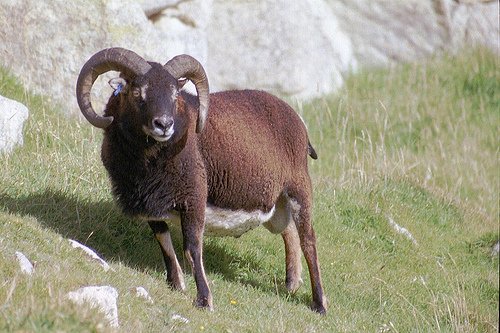
Soay ram on St Kilda

St Kilda is a breeding ground for many important seabird species. The world's largest colony of gannets, totalling 30,000 pairs, amount to 24 percent of the global population. There are 49,000 breeding pairs of Leach's petrels, up to 90 percent of the European population; 136,000 pairs of Atlantic puffins, about 30 percent of the UK total breeding population, and 67,000 northern fulmar pairs, about 13 percent of the UK total. Dùn is home to the largest colony of fulmars in the UK. Prior to 1828, St Kilda was their only UK breeding ground, but they have since spread and established colonies elsewhere, such as Fowlsheugh. The last great auk (Pinguinus impennis) seen in Britain was killed on Stac an Armin in July 1840. Unusual behaviour by St Kilda's bonxies was recorded in 2007 during research into recent falls in the Leach's petrel population. Using night vision gear, ecologists observed the skuas hunting petrels at night, a remarkable strategy for a seabird. A subspecies of Eurasian wren, the St Kilda wren Troglodytes troglodytes hirtensis, is unique to St Kilda.

=== Marine life ===
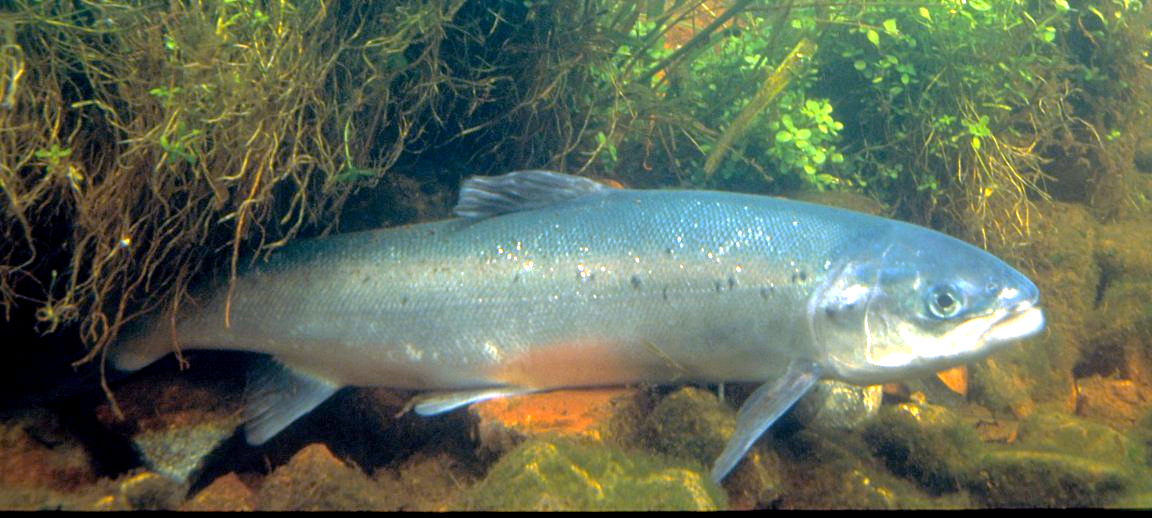
Atlantic salmon

Salmon frequent several Lewis rivers after crossing the Atlantic. Many of the fresh-water lochs are home to fish such as trout. Other freshwater fish present include Arctic char, European eel, 3 and 9 spined sticklebacks, thick-lipped mullet and flounder.

Offshore, it is common to see seals, particularly in Stornoway harbour, and with luck, dolphins, porpoises, sharks and even the occasional whale can be encountered.

Occasional turtles, mainly loggerhead and leathery, may be met in coastal waters.

In Great Bernera, sea life is especially rich where there is tidal run between the Caolas Bhalasaigh (English: "Valasay Straits/Kyles") and the inner sea-loch of Tòb Bhalasaigh. There are numerous molluscs, sponges, brittlestars and starfish, the latter growing noticeably larger in size than normal. Cup coral, snakelocks anemone and dead man's fingers coral, may also be found here. Common fish include shanny and butterfish and Atlantic and common seals are regular off-shore visitors.

Common seals often congregate at low tide on the rocks in Bays Loch in Berneray (North Uist), grey seals, which are larger and can be distinguished by the long noses, are also to be found there occasionally, but are more common off the West Beach. The grey seal now breeds on Hirta but did not do so before the 1930 evacuation.

The beach at Village Bay in St Kilda is unusual in that its short stretch of summer sand recedes in winter, exposing the large boulders on which it rests. A survey of the beach in 1953 found only a single resident species, the crustacean isopod Eurydice pulchra.

Amongst the more exotic species found off the Outer Hebrides, is the giant squid (Architeuthis) – specimens are occasionally washed up on the islands.

=== Land mammals ===
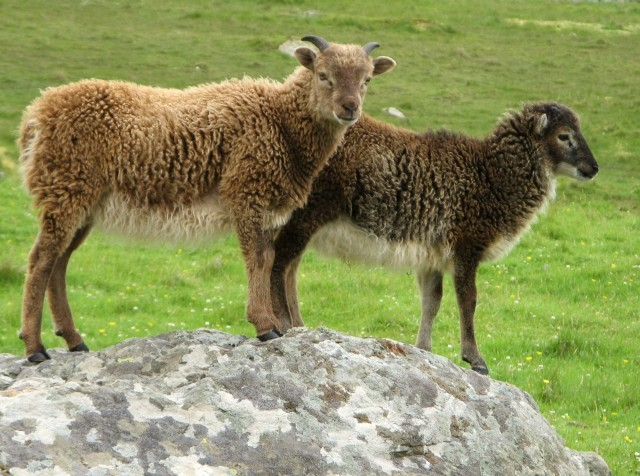
Soay lambs on Hirta

Eurasian otters and red deer are the Western Isles' native land mammals. Humans introduced species such as European rabbits, blue hares, hedgehogs, brown and black rats, feral cats, minks and polecats. Other species such as mice and voles are of unclear origin.

There has been considerable controversy over hedgehogs on South Uist. The animals are not native to the islands, having been introduced in the 1970s to reduce garden pests. They now pose a threat to the eggs of ground nesting wading birds on the reserve. In 2003 Scottish Natural Heritage undertook a cull of hedgehogs in the area.

American mink are another introduced species (escapees from fur farms) and cause problems for native ground-nesting birds, the local fishing industry and poultry farmers. Due to this impact and following a successful eradication of the species from the Uists and Barra, the second and ongoing phase of the Hebridean Mink Project aims to rid mink from Lewis and Harris in similar fashion.

The Shiant Isles were home to a colony of black rats, which may originally have come ashore from a shipwreck. Apart from one or two small islands in the Firth of Forth, the Shiants were the only place in the UK where the black rat or ship's rat (Rattus rattus) could be found. There were thought to have been about 3,000 rats on the islands. Analysis of their stomach contents demonstrated that the Shiant rats did eat seabirds, but it is impossible to tell if they preyed on live birds or simply scavenged dead remains. Following a program between 2014 and 2018 run by the RSPB, Scottish Natural Heritage and the custodians of the Shiants, the Nicolson Family the Shiants were officially declared free of the black rat.

A subspecies of wood mouse known as the St Kilda field mouse (Apodemus sylvaticus hirtensis) is unique to St Kilda. A subspecies of house mouse known as the St Kilda house mouse (Mus musculus muralis), vanished completely after the evacuation of human inhabitants, as it was strictly associated with settlements and buildings. It had a number of traits in common with a sub-species (Mus musculus mykinessiensis) found on Mykines island in the Faroe Islands.

The St Kildans kept up to 2,000 sheep, which were removed at the time of the evacuation, but a herd of 107 indigenous Soay sheep were transferred onto Hirta from Soay and now live in a feral state. Soay sheep are a very primitive breed that do not require shearing. Numbers vary from 600 to 1,700 on Hirta, and 200 remain on Soay. A few have been exported to form breeding populations in other nations, where they are valued for their hardiness and small size. On Hirta and Soay, they prefer the plantago pastures, which grow well in locations exposed to sea spray and include red fescue, sea plantain and sea pink. There is also a breed of feral sheep residing on Boreray, which is one of the most endangered British sheep in existence.

There are claims that the Stornoway castle grounds are home to bats. In addition, there are farmed animals such as sheep, cattle and a few pigs.

=== Reptiles and amphibians ===
In common with Ireland, no snakes inhabit Lewis, only the slowworm which is merely mistaken for a snake. Actually a legless lizard, it is the sole member of its order present. The common frog may be found in the centre of the island though it, along with any newts or toads present are introduced species.

=== Insects ===
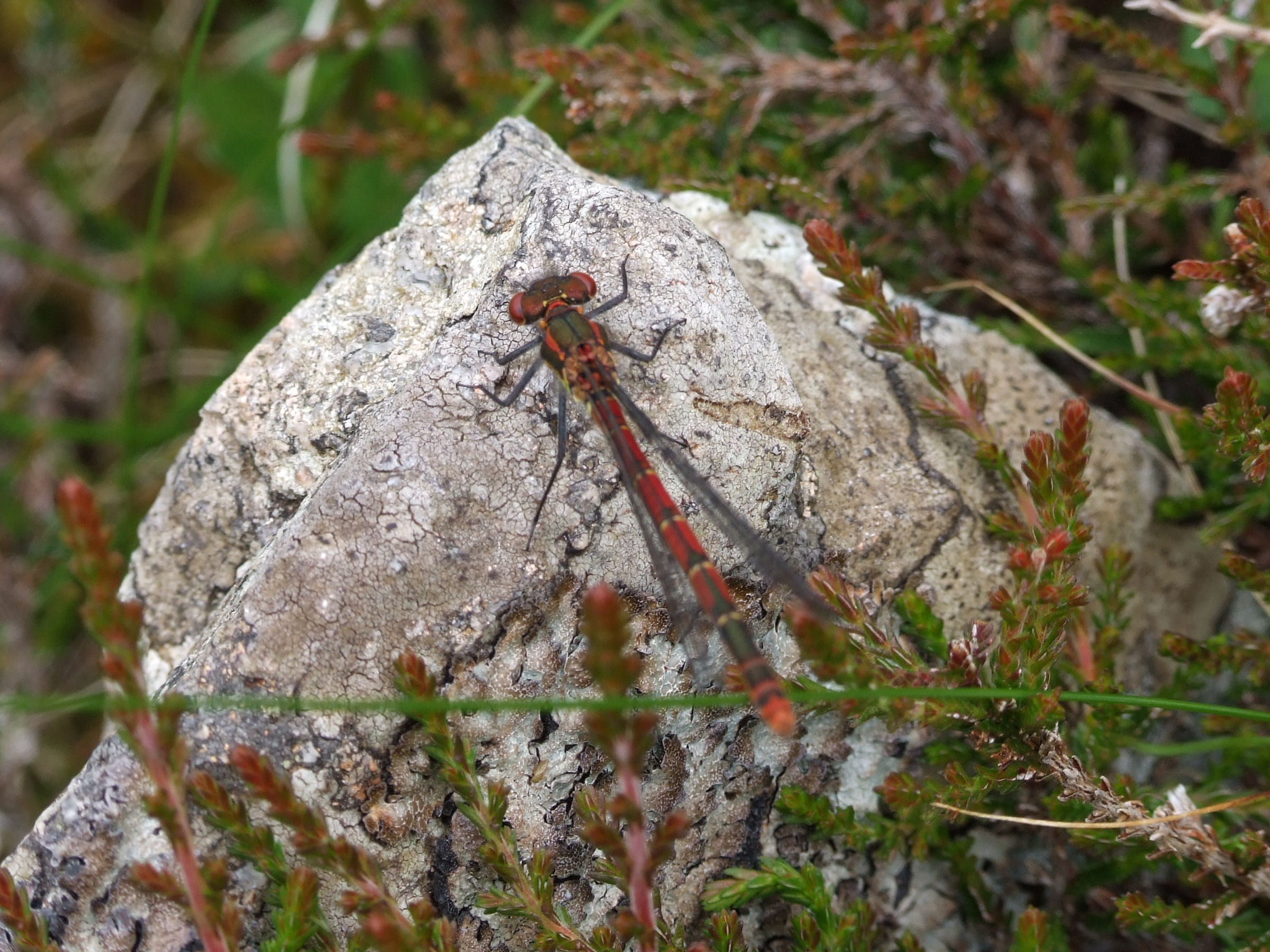
Dragonfly near Valtos, Uig

The island's most famous insect resident is the Highland midge which is ever-present near water at certain times of the year.

During the summer months, several species of butterflies and dragonflies can be found, especially outside Stornoway.

The richness of insect life in Lewis is evident from the fact that carnivorous plants, such as the sundew, thrive in parts of the island.

== Plant life ==
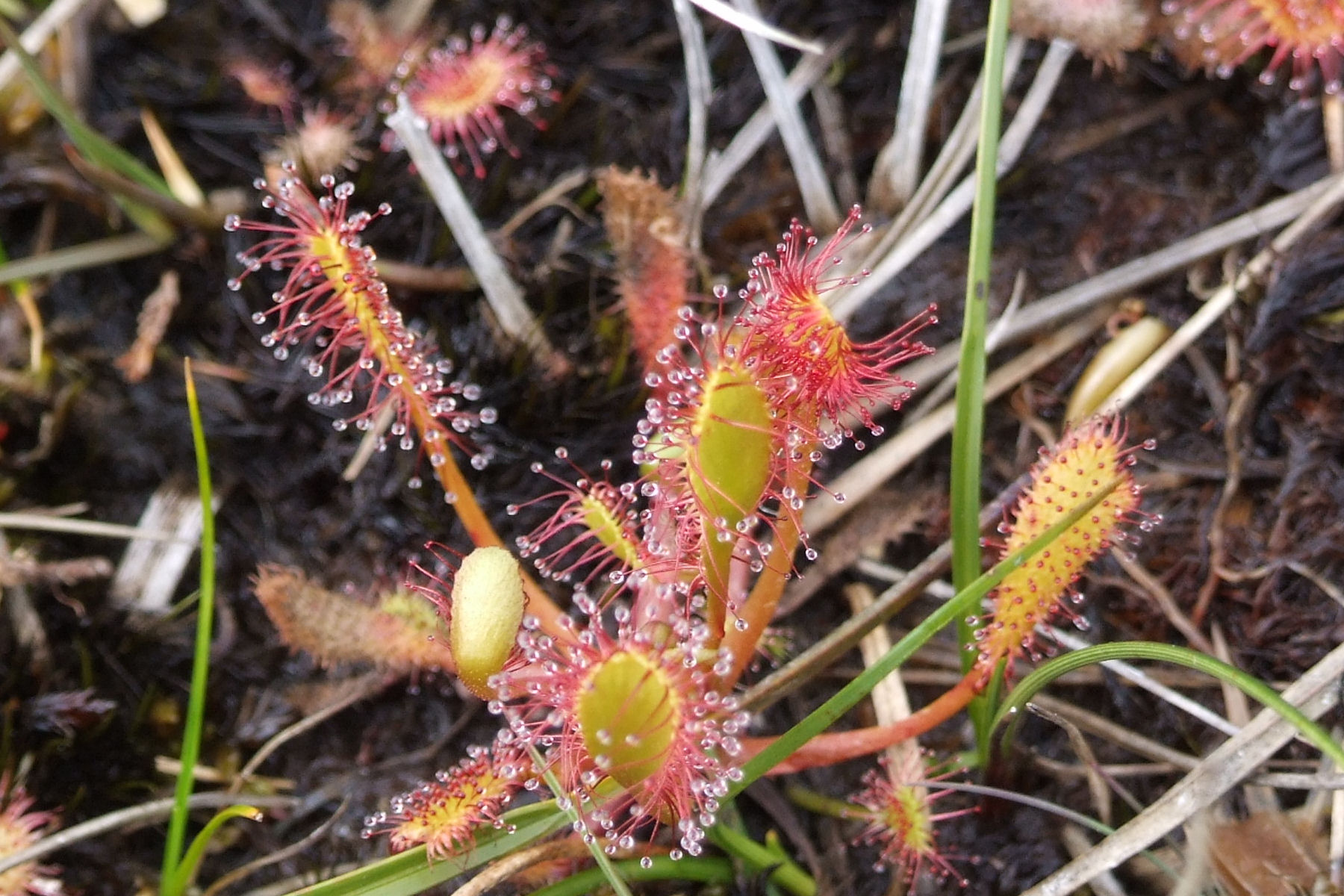
Sundew near Valtos

The machair is noted for different species of orchid and associated vegetation such as various grasses. Three heathers; ling, bell heather and cross-leaved heather are predominant in the large areas of moorland vegetation which also holds large numbers of insectivorous plants such as sundews. The expanse of heather-covered moorland explains the name Eilean an Fhraoich, Gaelic for The Heather Isle.

Lewis was once covered by woodland, but the only natural woods remaining are in small pockets on inland cliffs and on islands within lochs, away from fire and sheep. In recent years, Forestry Commission plantations of spruce and pine were planted; but, most of the pines were destroyed by moth infestation. The most important mixed woods are those planted around Lews Castle in Stornoway, dating from the mid-19th century.

Bonnie Prince Charlie's flower (Calystegia soldanella), reputedly originating from French seeds dropped by Bonnie Prince Charlie is, in Scotland, found only on Vatersay and Eriskay.

St Kilda

Plant life in St Kilda is heavily influenced by the salt spray, strong winds and acidic peaty soils. No trees grow on the archipelago, although there are more than 130 different flowering plants, 162 species of fungi and 160 bryophytes. Several rarities exist amongst the 194 lichen species. Kelp thrives in the surrounding seas, which contain a diversity of unusual marine invertebrates. The St Kilda dandelion (Taraxacum pankhurstianum) is a species of dandelion endemic to the island of Hirta, identified in 2012.

Mingulay

On Mingulay there is but a single tree – a 2 metre high poplar on a cliff overlooking Mingulay Bay. Sea holly (Eryngium maritimum), otherwise rare in the Western Isles, has grown on Mingulay since at least the late 19th century, and sea milkwort (Glaux maritima), normally only found at sea level is able to grow on the high cliff tops due to the ocean spray and seagull manure.

== Nature reserves and Sites of Special Scientific Interest ==
=== Isle of Lewis ===
There are 15 SSSIs on Lewis in the biology category, spread across the island. Additionally, the Lewis Peatlands are recognised by Scottish Natural Heritage as a Special Protection Area, Special Area of Conservation and a Ramsar site, showing their importance as a wetland habitat for migratory and resident bird life.

=== Balranald RSPB Reserve ===
Situated on the extreme western point of North Uist, the RSPB reserve at Balranald includes sandy beaches, rocky foreshore, marshes and sand dunes. An information centre explains the importance of traditional crofting agriculture for corncrakes and other wildlife.

Many wading and farmland birds nest on the flower-rich machair and croft-land – perhaps your best chance to hear and to even see corncrakes.

=== South Uist Nature Reserve ===
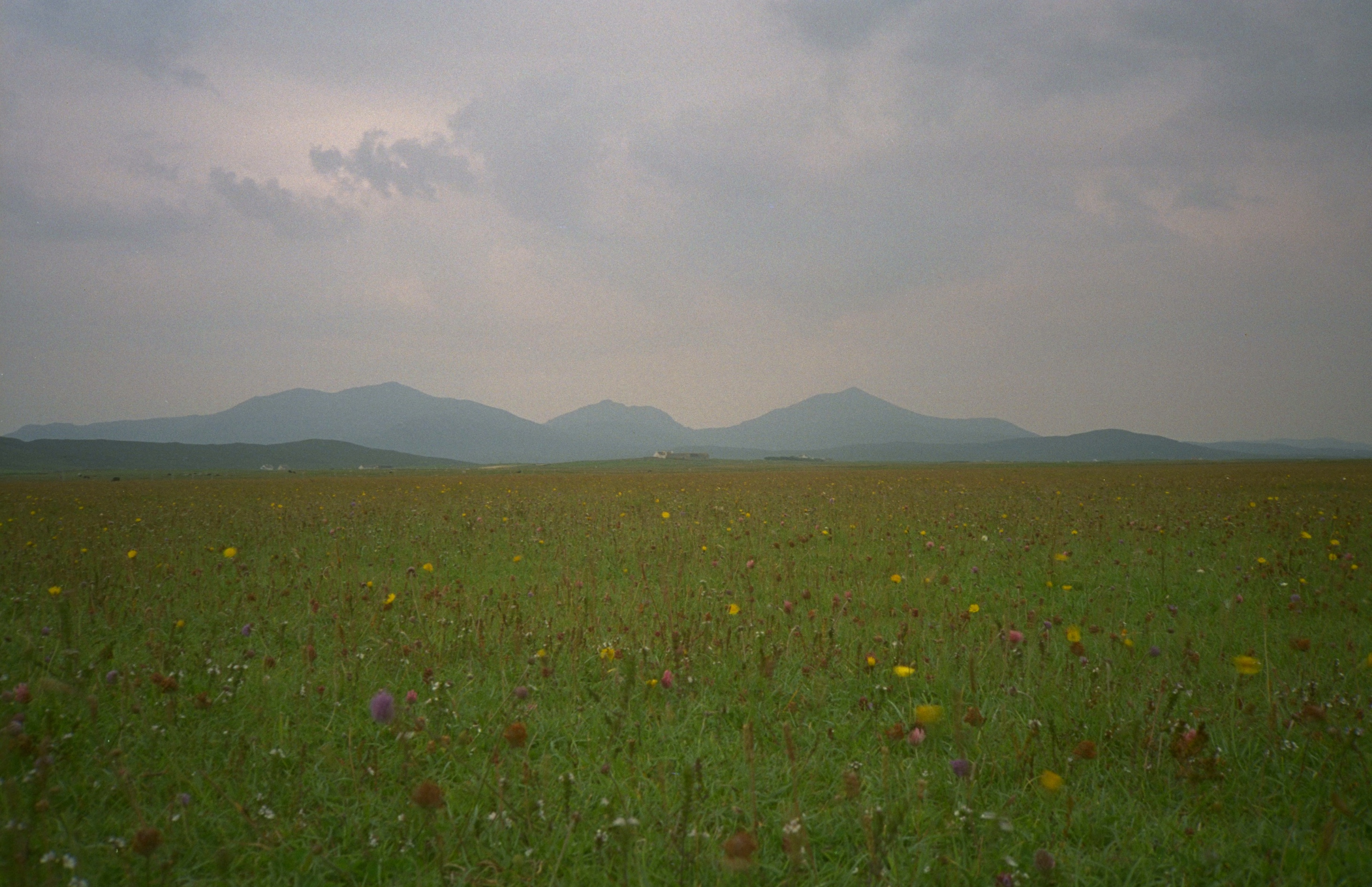
Flowering machair on South Uist

Loch Druidibeg in the north of the island is a national nature reserve owned and managed by Scottish Natural Heritage. The reserve covers 1,677 hectares of machair, bog, freshwater lochs, estuary heather moorland and hill. Over 200 species of flowering plants have been recorded on the reserve, some of which are nationally scarce. South Uist is considered the best place in the UK for the aquatic plant slender naiad (Najas flexilis) which is a European Protected Species.

Nationally important populations of breeding waders are also present, including redshank, dunlin, lapwing and ringed plover. The reserve is also home to greylag geese on the loch and in summer corncrakes on the machair. Otters and hen harriers are also seen.

=== Monach Islands Nature Reserve ===
The Monach Islands are a national nature reserve for the undisturbed machair and their grey seal population. About 10,000 come ashore each autumn to have their pups and mate, making it one of the largest such colonies in the world. There are also a large number of nesting seabirds and a rich flora. Grey herons nest in some of the abandoned buildings.

=== Mingulay and Berneray ===
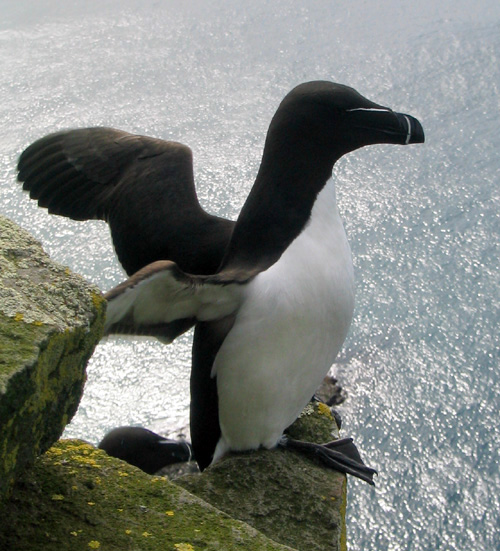
Razorbill: Alca torda

Mingulay and nearby Berneray became a Site of Special Scientific Interest in 1983. Mingulay has a large seabird population and is an important breeding ground for razorbills (9,514 pairs, 6.3% of the European population), guillemots (11,063 pairs) and black-legged kittiwakes (2,939 pairs). Shags (694 individuals), fulmar (11,626 pairs), puffins (2,072 pairs), storm petrel, common terns, Arctic terns, bonxies and various species of gull also nest in the sea-cliffs. Manx shearwaters nested on Lianamul stack until the late 18th century, when they were driven away by puffins, and tysties have also been recorded there.

Sheep graze the island's rough pastures and there is a population of rabbits, introduced by shepherds after the 1912 evacuation. Grey seals are abundant, numbers having grown substantially since the departure of human residents. Although they do not breed, up to 1,000 make use of the beach in winter.

=== Flannan Isles ===
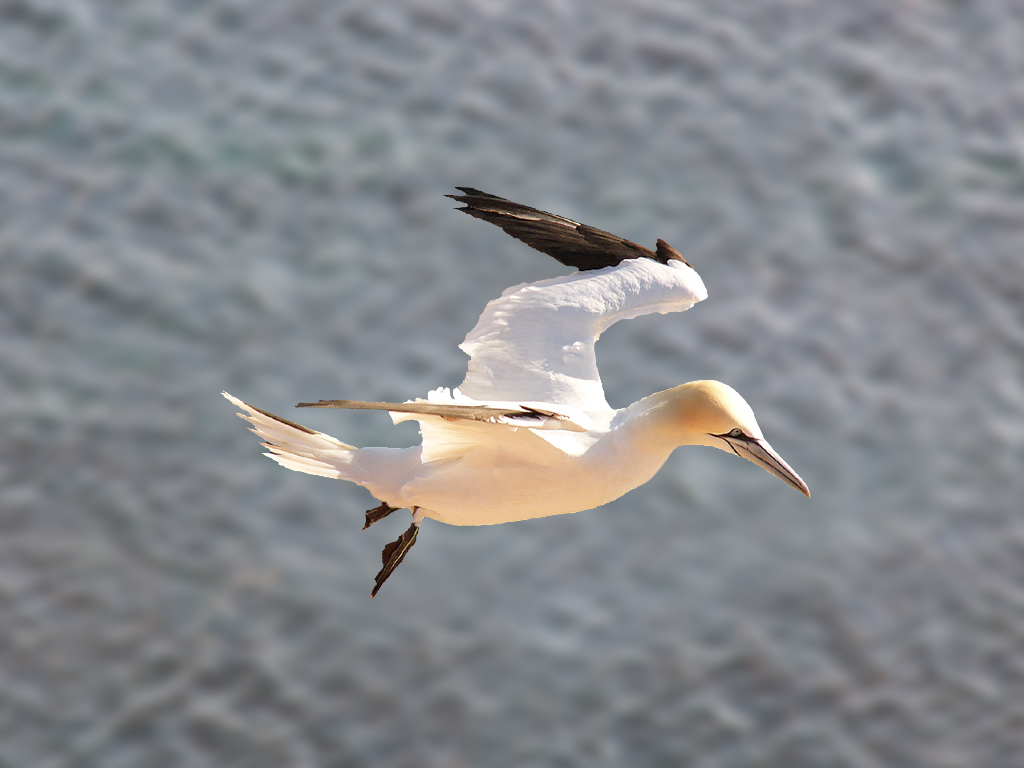
Northern gannet (Morus bassanus)

The Flannan Isles provide nesting for a population of seabirds, including Atlantic puffins, northern fulmars, European storm-petrels, Leach's petrels, common shag and black-legged kittiwakes. There is a gannetry on Roaireim. From the late Middle Ages on, Lewismen regularly raided these nests for eggs, birds and feathers.

There is a population of Arctic hares, brought to the islands by the lighthouse keepers, and crofters from Bernera graze sheep on the most fertile islands.

Minke and pilot whales, as well as Risso's and other species of dolphin are commonly observed in the vicinity.

The islands became a Site of Special Scientific Interest in December 1983.

=== St Kilda ===
St Kilda
UNESCO World Heritage Site
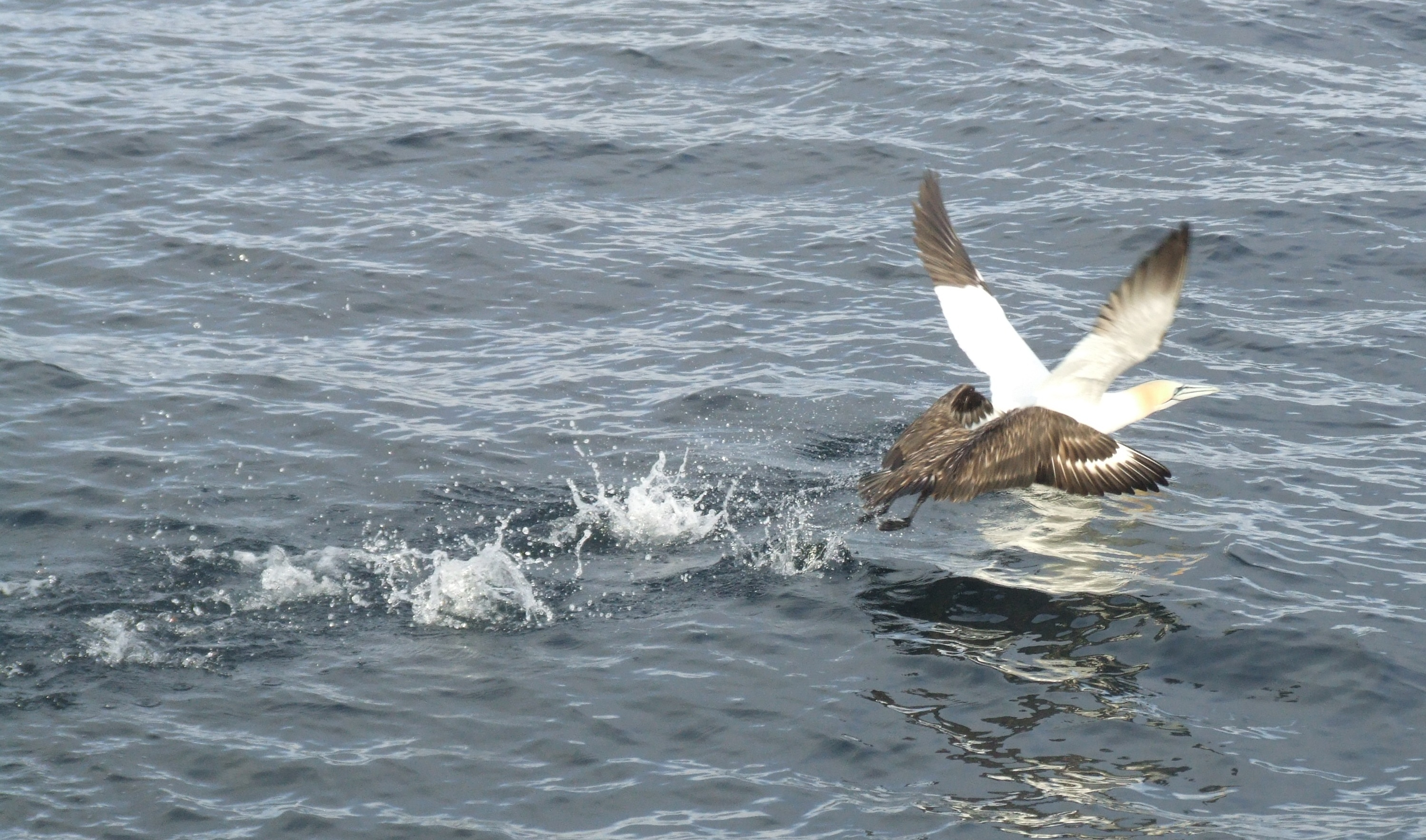
- Great skua (bonxie) attacking gannet near Stac an Armin (St Kilda)

- Location within Scotland
- Location: St Kilda, Scotland, United Kingdom
- Criteria: Cultural and Natural: (iii)(v)(vii)(ix)(x)
- Reference: 387ter
- Inscription: 1986 (10th Session)
- Extensions: 2004, 2005
- Area: 24,201.4 ha (59,803 acres)
- Coordinates: 57°49′2″N 8°34′36″W

On his death on 14 August 1956, the Marquess of Bute's will bequeathed the archipelago to the National Trust for Scotland provided they accepted the offer within six months. After much soul-searching, the Executive Committee agreed to do so in January 1957. The slow renovation and conservation of the village began, much of it undertaken by summer volunteer work parties. In addition, scientific research began on the feral Soay sheep population and other aspects of the natural environment. In 1957 the area was designated a national nature reserve.

In 1986 the islands became the first place in Scotland to be inscribed as a UNESCO World Heritage Site, for its terrestrial natural features. In 2004, St Kilda achieved a joint 'marine' status for its superlative natural features, its habitats for rare and endangered species, and its internationally important population of seabirds. By 2005 St Kilda thus became one of only two dozen global locations to be awarded World Heritage Status for both 'natural' and 'cultural' significance. The islands share this honour with internationally important sites such as Machu Picchu in Peru, Mount Athos in Greece and the Ukhahlamba/Drakensberg Park in South Africa.

The St Kilda World Heritage Site covers a total area of 24,201.4 hectares (93.4 sq mi) including the land and sea. The land area is 854.6 hectares (2,111.8 acres).

St Kilda is a scheduled monument, a national scenic area, a Site of Special Scientific Interest, and a European Union Special Protection Area. Visiting yachts may find shelter in Village Bay, but those wishing to land are told to contact the National Trust for Scotland in advance. Concern exists about the introduction of non-native animal and plant species into such a fragile environment.

St Kilda's marine environment of underwater caves, arches and chasms offers a challenging but superlative diving experience. Such is the power of the North Atlantic swell that the effects of the waves can be detected 70 metres (230 ft) below sea level. In 2008 the National Trust for Scotland received the support of Scotland's Minister for Environment, Michael Russell for their plan to ensure no rats come ashore from The Spinningdale, a Spanish fishing vessel grounded on Hirta. There was concern that birdlife on the island could be seriously affected. Fortunately, potential contaminants from the vessel including fuel, oils, bait and stores were successfully removed by Dutch salvage company Mammoet before the bird breeding season in early April.

== See also ==
- Fauna of Scotland
- Geology of Scotland
- List of islands of Scotland
- Outer Hebrides
