= Fauna of Wales =

Animals living in Wales

Fauna of Wales includes marine and land animals, birds and reptiles that are resident, visitors or have been introduced to Wales.

== Marine and river animals ==
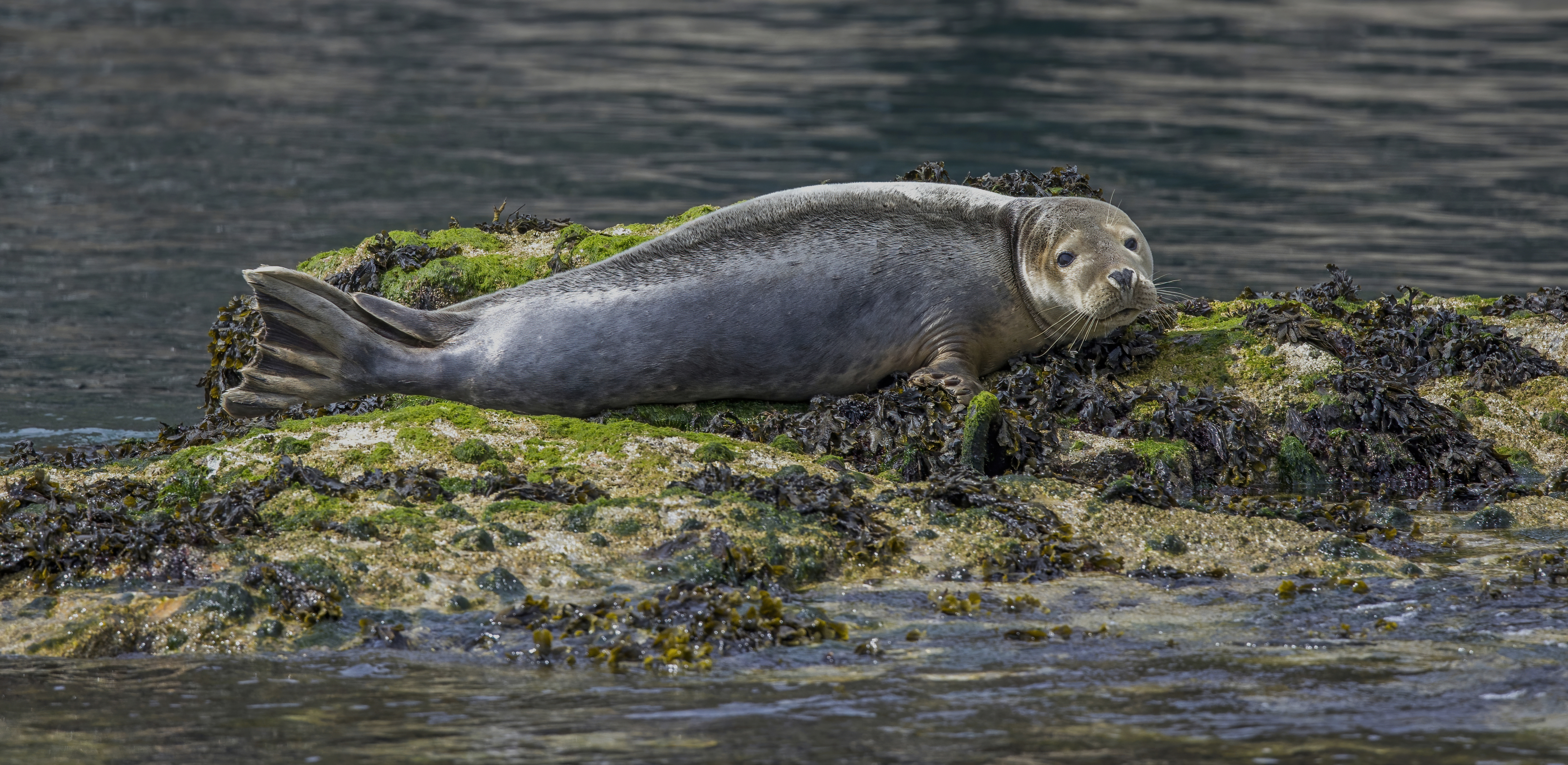
Common seal juvenile, off Skomer Island, Pembrokeshire, Wales

Around Cardigan Bay and the Pembrokeshire coast, minke and pilot whales are common in the summer while fin and killer whales are rare. Bottlenose dolphins are common and Risso’s dolphin and Atlantic white-sided dolphin are rare. Whales and grey seals can be seen. Herring, mackerel and hake are the more common of the country's marine fish, but basking sharks and sunfish can also be seen.

River fish of note include char, eel, salmon, shad, sparling and Arctic char, whilst the gwyniad is unique to Wales, found in two locations, Llyn Tegid (Bala Lake), with a conservation population in another lake in the same area.

Wales is known for its shellfish, including cockles, limpet, mussels and periwinkles.

== Land mammals ==
The red deer, one of five native deer species, is the biggest non-marine mammal in Wales. Fallow deer (Dama dama) are found in rural and semi-urban areas, and roe deer (Capreolus capreolus) are found in central and northern Wales; muntjac and sika deer can also be found. Other mammals include badgers, foxes (one of the most common mammals in Wales), hares, hedgehogs, otters, rabbits, stoats, weasels and red squirrels; pine martens are very rarely seen, but European polecat (Mustela putorius) can be found in both urban and country environments. Wales has 13 species of bat.

Feral goats can be found in Snowdonia. In March 2021, Natural Resources Wales (NRW) granted a licence to release up to six beavers in the Dyfi Valley, the first official beaver release in Wales.

== Birds ==
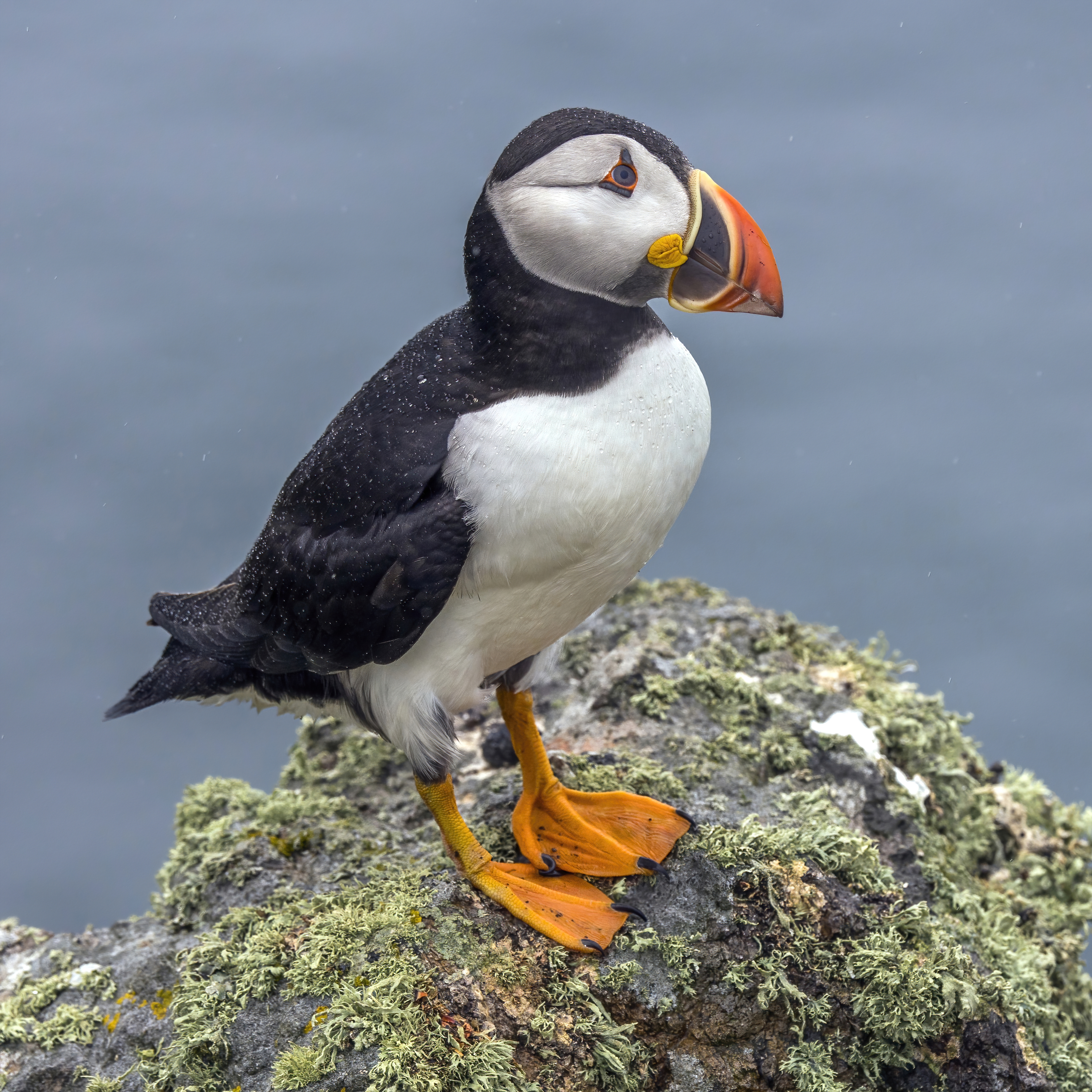
Puffin on the North Coast of Skomer Island, Pembrokeshire, Wales

About 430 species of birds have been found in Wales. Red kites (the national bird of Wales) and ospreys are some "signature species" of Wales. Dippers, choughs, puffins, guillemots, razorbills, short-eared owls, Manx shearwaters, whimbrel and plovers are also common. Montagu's harrier (Circus pygargus), a rare species in Britain, has several nesting places in Wales. Red grouse (Lagopus lagopus scotica), once a common species, has reduced in population dramatically due to human hunting; they are found in the extreme north of Wales.

== Reptiles ==
Adders, common lizards, notably around Oxwich Bay and grass snakes have been recorded. Some sand lizards bred by Herpetological Conservation Trust volunteers and Chester and Jersey Zoos have been released into the wild.

There are two populations of formerly extinct Aesculapian snake in Wales which derive from escapes. The older recorded of these is in the grounds and vicinity of the Welsh Mountain Zoo near Conwy in North Wales. This population has persisted and reproduced since at least the early 1970s, and in 2022 the population was estimated at 70 adults. In 2020, a population was confirmed as being present in Bridgend, Wales. This population has persisted for approximately 20 years.

== Priority Species ==
Priority species
Lesser horseshoe bat (Rhinolophus hipposideros)	Greater horseshoe bat (Rhinolophus ferrumequinum)
Common pipistrelle (Pipistrellus pipistrellus)	Common dolphin (Delphinus delphis)
Natterjack toad (Bufo calamita)	Grass snake (Natrix natrix)
Common lizard (Lacerta vivipara)	Pine marten (Martes martes)
Chough (Pyrrhocorax pyrrhocorax)	Common toad (Bufo bufo)
Harbour porpoise (Phocoena phocoena)	Bottlenose dolphin (Tursiops truncatus)
Minke whale (Balaenoptera acutorostrata)	Otter (Lutra lutra)
Marsh fritillary (Euphydryas aurinia)	Twait shad (Alosa fallax)
Great crested newt (Triturus cristatus)	Adder (Vipera berus)
Eurasian skylark (Alauda arvensis)	Polecat (Mustela putorius)
Water vole (Arvicola amphibius)	Risso's dolphin (Grampus griseus)
