= Iuridae =

Scientific classification
- Kingdom: Animalia
- Phylum: Arthropoda
- Subphylum: Chelicerata
- Class: Arachnida
- Order: Scorpiones
- Superfamily: Iuroidea
- Family: Iuridae; Thorell, 1876

Family of scorpions

The Iuridae are a family of scorpions. Six genera and at least 20 described species are placed in the Iuridae.

== Genera ==
- Anatoliurus
- Calchas
- Iurus
- Letoiurus
- Metaiurus
- Neocalchas
- Protoiurus
