= List of butterflies of Europe =

This is a list of the 473 butterfly species which are found in Europe sensu lato (including Russia west of the Urals and the Caucasus region). Europe forms the western part of the Palearctic biogeographical zone and includes:

- Euro-Siberian region

The boreal and temperate Euro-Siberian region transitions from tundra and taiga in northern Russia and Scandinavia. South of the taiga is a belt of temperate broadleaf and mixed forests and temperate coniferous forests.

- North and Central Europe
- Mediterranean Basin ecoregions border the Mediterranean Sea in southern Europe.

Biogeographic regions of Europe (including Asian part of Turkey): the Arctic, Boreal, Atlantic, Continental, Alpine, Pannonian, Mediterranean, Macaronesian, Steppic, Black Sea and Anatolian regions.

The list is divided into five sections:

- List of butterflies of Europe (Papilionidae) - 13 species
- List of butterflies of Europe (Pieridae) - 50 species
- List of butterflies of Europe (Nymphalidae) - 232 species
- List of butterflies of Europe (Lycaenidae) - 129 species
- List of butterflies of Europe (Hesperiidae) - 47 species
- List of butterflies of Europe (Riodinidae) – 1 species
