= Biogeographic regions of Europe =

Map of the biogeographic regions of Europe

The biogeographic regions of Europe are biogeographic regions defined by the European Environment Agency. They were initially limited to the European Union member states, but later extended to cover all of Europe west of the Urals, including all of Turkey. The map of biogeographic regions is deliberately simplified and ignores local anomalies. It is intended primarily as a framework for coordinating and reporting overall results of conservation efforts.

== Berne Convention and Habitats Directive ==
Council of Europe member states

The Habitats Directive of 21 May 1992 on the conservation of natural habitats and of wild fauna and flora is a key component of the European conservation policy. It established the European Union's Natura 2000 network of protected areas. Within the European Union, the Habitats Directive implements the 1 June 1982 Berne Convention on the Conservation of European Wildlife and Natural Habitats of the Council of Europe. The Habitats Directive has a smaller geographical scope than the Berne Convention but stronger enforcement mechanisms.

The challenges to habitats and species vary across Europe due to differences in climate, topography, soil conditions and so on, but the problems and solutions may be similar between neighboring countries, which may benefit from coordinating conservation efforts for sites within the same biogeographical region. Annex III of the Habitats Directive discusses a 2-stage approach to prioritizing conservation:

- In Stage 1 each member country assesses the relative importance of sites in their country for habitats and species based on criteria defined in the Habitats Directive.
- Stage 2 assesses the member country sites at a European Community level. It considers the national value of the site, its size and biodiversity, whether it is part of a continuous ecosystem on both sides of a frontier between member states, and its global ecological importance for its biogeographical region. All sites identified by the Member States that have priority natural habitats or species are considered Sites of Community Importance.

== History ==
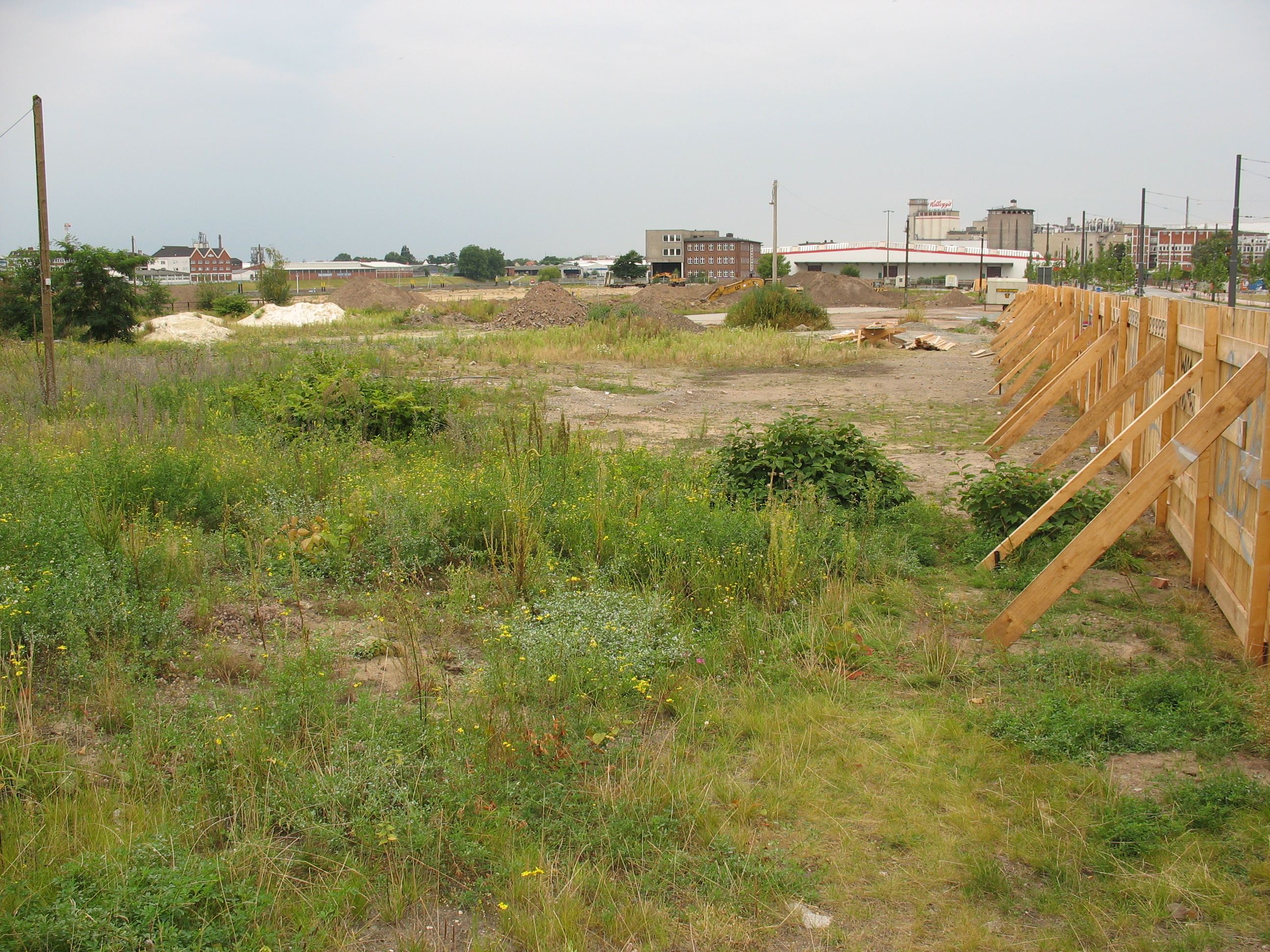
Fallow land in Bremen, Atlantic region, site of the Weser Tower

Alfred Russel Wallace made an early classification of the world's biogeographical regions and subregions in 1876. He placed Europe in the Palaearctic Region (today called the Palearctic realm), divided between the North Europe and Mediterranean subregions. The subregions roughly matched Augustin Pyramus de Candolle's botanical regions, and were basically an attempt to define areas of strongly related endemism.

The modern Biogeographical Regions Map of Europe was developed for use by the European Union member countries in applying the criteria of the Habitats Directive, Annex III, Stage 2: "... to assess the community importance and to select from the national lists the sites which will become Special Areas for Conservation." The proposed sites within each of the biogeographical regions are evaluated against the criteria given in Annex III.

The original Habitats Directive of 21 May 1992 identified five biogeographical regions: Alpine, Atlantic, Continental, Macaronesian and Mediterranean. These provide a geographical framework for creating a draft list of Sites of Community Importance from the lists provided by the member states. The Boreal region was added in 1995 when Austria, Finland and Sweden joined the European Union.

In 1996 the Standing Committee of the Berne Convention decided to set up the Emerald network of Areas of Special Conservation Interest (ASCI's). In 1998 the Standing Committee of the Berne Convention made it clear that for European Union member states the Emerald sites were the European Union's Natura 2000 network sites. The map of Biogeographical Regions therefore had to be expanded to cover all of Europe, not just the European Union. Five more biogeographical regions were added: Anatolian, Arctic, Black Sea, Pannonian and Steppic. The revised Biogeographical Regions map for the Pan-European area was approved by the Standing Committee of the Bern Convention in November 2001.

== Approach ==
The European Agency for Environmental Protection has taken a pragmatic approach to defining biogeographic regions in Europe. Basic principles included to limit the number of regions to those already identified in the Habitats Directive, with no "sub-classes", and to produce only a small scale map in which small islands of different regions or of no defined region would be included in the surrounding major region. For example, Turkey is divided into the Mediterranean, Black Sea and Anatolian biogeographic regions, but it could be argued that parts of that country belong to the Alpine region. For the sake of simplicity, national borders were sometimes taken as the borders between regions. Paper-based maps were used for some areas, so some of the boundaries are imprecise.

== Regions ==
The biogeographical regions and the main threats to their biodiversity as of 2003 are:

Region	Countries	% of EU	Main threats to biodiversity
Arctic	Iceland, Norway, Russia	0.0%	Global warming may change conditions for plant and animal communities; Ozone depletion
Atlantic	Belgium, Germany, Denmark, Spain, France, Ireland, Norway, Portugal, Netherlands, United Kingdom	18.4%	High degree of habitat fragmentation by transport and urban infrastructures; Intensive agriculture; Eutrophication with massive algal blooms; Invasive species
Boreal	Belarus, Estonia, Finland, Latvia, Lithuania, Norway, Russia, Sweden	18.8%	Intensive forestry practices; Exploitation for Hydroelectricity; Freshwater acidification
Continental	Austria, Belarus, Belgium, Bosnia-Herzegovina, Bulgaria, Croatia, Czech Republic, Germany, Denmark, France, Italy, Lithuania, Luxembourg, North Macedonia, Moldova, Poland, Romania, Russia, San Marino, Serbia, Slovenia, Sweden, Switzerland, Ukraine	29.3%	High degree of habitat fragmentation by transport and urban infrastructures, industry and mining; Air pollution; Intensive agriculture; Intensive use of rivers
Alpine	Albania, Andorra, Armenia, Austria, Bosnia-Herzegovina, Bulgaria, Croatia, Finland, France, Georgia, Germany, Italy, Liechtenstein, Montenegro, North Macedonia, Norway, Poland, Romania, Russia, Serbia, Slovenia, Slovakia, Spain, Sweden, Ukraine (Alps, Pyrenees, Carpathians, Dinaric Alps, Balkans, Rhodopes, Sondes, Urals, Caucasia)	8.6%	Climate change may change conditions for plant and animal communities; Transport infrastructures; Tourism; Dams
Pannonian	Croatia, Czech Republic, Hungary, Romania, Serbia, Slovakia, Ukraine	3.0%	Intensification of agriculture; Drainage of wetlands; Irrigation combined with evaporation leads to salinisation and alkalisation; Eutrophication of large lakes; Mining industry with heavy metals pollution of some rivers
Steppic	Kazakhstan, Moldova, Romania, Russia, Ukraine	0.9	Intensification of agriculture, e.g. abandonment of nomadic pastoral activities; Desertification; Large mining and industrial settlements, with pollution problems
Black Sea	Bulgaria, Georgia, Romania, Russia, Turkey	0.3%	Intensification of agriculture: irrigation, salinisation; Waterlogging; Tourism
Mediterranean	Albania, Bosnia-Herzegovina, Croatia, Cyprus, France, Greece, Italy, Malta, Monaco, Montenengro, Portugal, Spain, Turkey	20.6%	The world's most important tourism destination; High pressures from urbanisation in coastal areas; Intensification of agriculture in plains, land-abandonment in mid-mountains; Desertification in some areas; Invasive alien species
Macaronesian	Portugal, Spain (Azores, Madeira, Canaries islands)	0.2%	Invasive alien species; Tourism; Wildfires and uncontrolled tree-felling; Intensification of agriculture with large greenhouses
Anatolian	Turkey	0.0%	Intensification of agriculture : conversion of steppes into arable lands, irrigation, drainage of wetlands, overgrazing; Building of dams

The European country with the most biogeographical regions is Russia, with six, followed by Romania, with five. Croatia, France, Norway, and Spain each include four biogeographical regions.

== Sources ==
- Annex III Criteria For Selecting Sites Eligible For Identification As Sites Of Community Importance And Designation As Special Areas Of Conservation, European Union
- Efe, Recep (17 March 2014), Environment and Ecology in the Mediterranean Region II, Cambridge Scholars Publishing, ISBN 978-1-4438-5773-4
- Epstein, Yaffa (2014), "The Habitats Directive and Bern Convention: Synergy and Dysfunction in Public International and EU Law", Georgetown International Environmental Law Review, 26 (2), SSRN 2254785
- Europe's environment: the third assessment. Environmental assessment report No 10., Luxembourg: European Environment Agency, 2003, ISBN 92-9167-574-1
- Huggett, Richard J. (2004), Fundamentals of Biogeography, Psychology Press, ISBN 978-0-415-32347-5
- Roekaerts, Marc (March 2002), The Biogeographical Regions Map of Europe: Basic principles of its creation and overview of its development, European Environment Agency
- Sundseth, Kerstin; Barova, Sylvia (2009), Natura 2000 in the Black Sea Region (PDF), European Commission Environment Directorate General, doi:10.2779/7908, ISBN 978-92-79-11585-1
- The Habitats Directive, European Commission
- The Natura 2000 Biogeographical Regions, European Commission DG Environment
