= Environmental issues in Turkey =

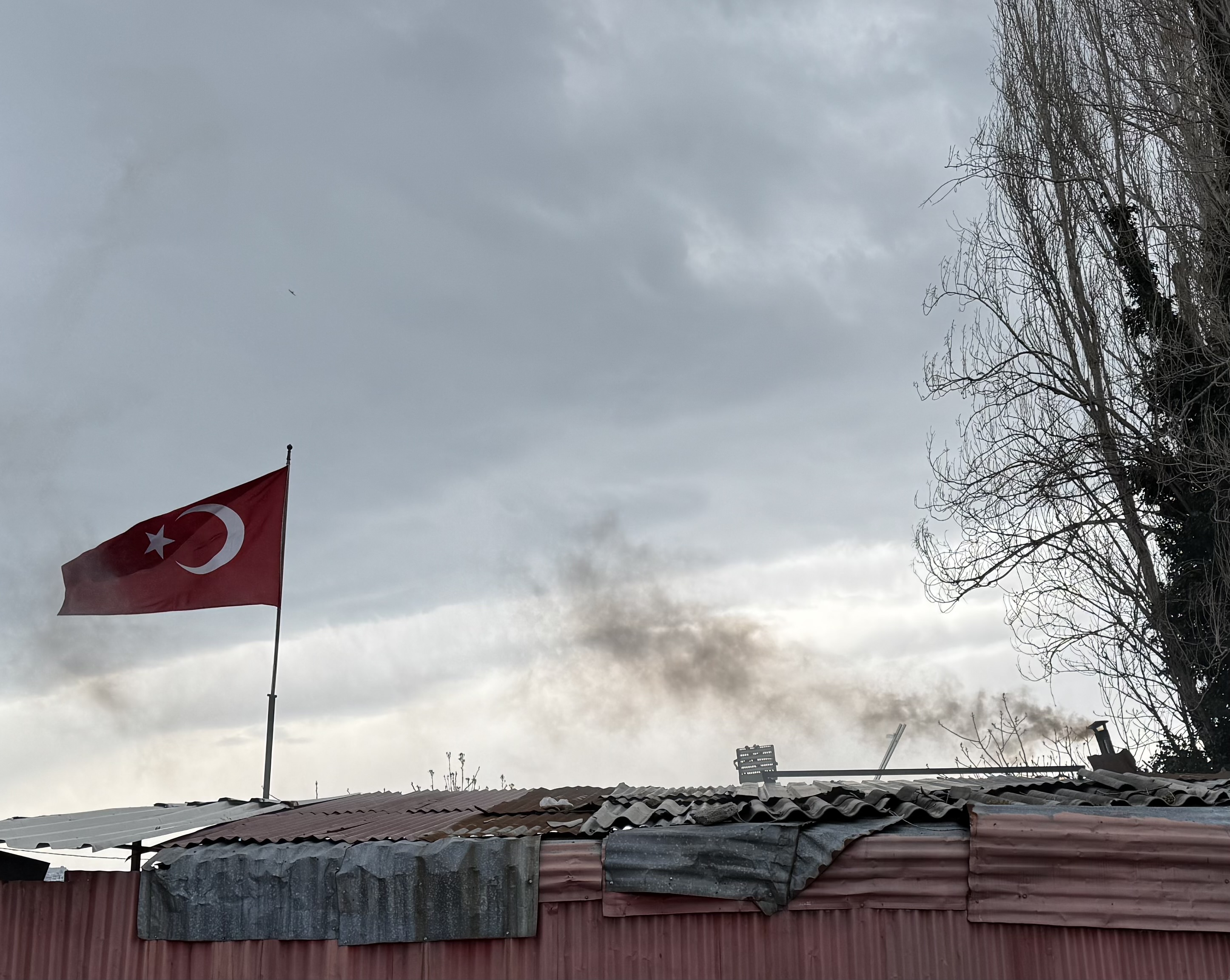
Air pollution in Samsun in Turkey

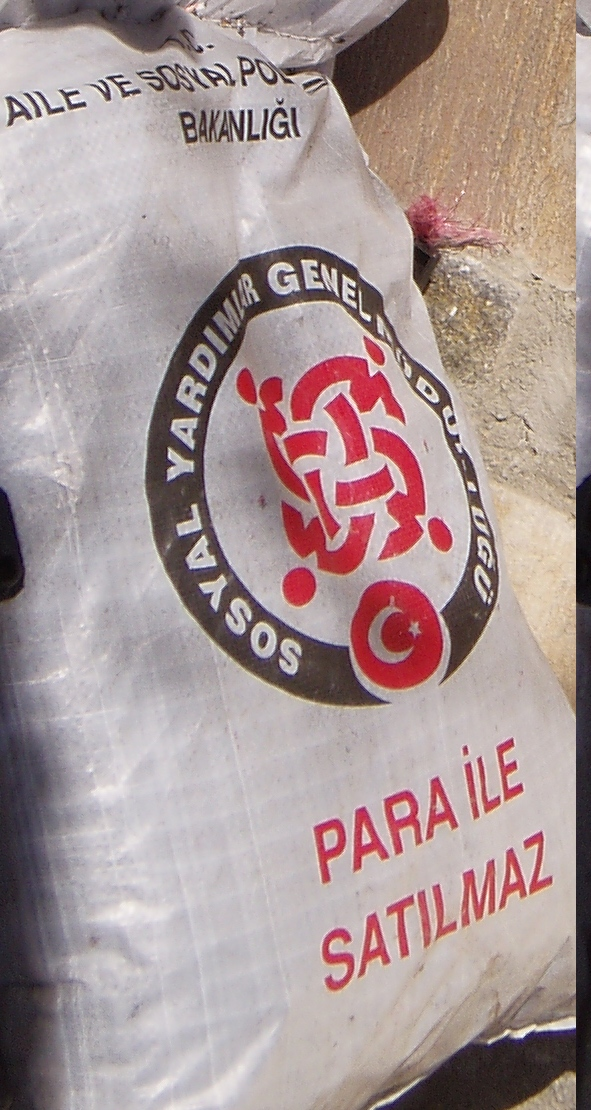
Free coal is distributed to the poor by the Ministry of Family and Social Policy.

Turkey hosts more than three thousand endemic plant species, has high diversity of other taxa, and is mostly covered by three of the world's thirty-five biodiversity hotspots. Although some environmental pressures have been decoupled from economic growth, the environment still faces many threats, such as coal and diesel fuel emitting greenhouse gases and deadly fine particulate air pollution. There is no fine particulate limit and coal in Turkey is subsidized. Some say the country is a pollution haven.

== Issues ==
=== Conservation of biodiversity ===
The wildlife of Turkey is diverse, due to its wide variety of habitats and unique position between three continents and three seas. "Ill-considered development projects are threatening biodiversity, but a new wildlife corridor offers hope for further conservation progress." Turkish montane forests face major threats to their genetic diversity associated with over-exploitation, forest fragmentation, air pollution, and global climatic change. The European Environment Agency has identified three biogeographic regions in Turkey, the Black Sea, Mediterranean and Anatolian regions, which should be protected under the Berne Convention on the Conservation of European Wildlife and Natural Habitats, to which Turkey is signatory.

Forest in Turkey had a 2018 Forest Landscape Integrity Index mean score of 6.39/10, ranking it 75th globally out of 172 countries.

=== Air pollution ===
Air pollution is particularly significant in urban areas; the problem is especially acute in Istanbul, Ankara, Erzurum, and Bursa, where the combustion of heating fuels increases particulate density in winter. Almost all the urban population is exposed to particulate matter emissions higher than the EU and World Health Organization limits. Especially in Istanbul, increased car ownership causes frequent urban smog conditions. "Air pollution in urban centers, often caused by transport, and the use of small-scale burning of wood or coal, is linked to a range of health problems." "PM10 levels are 36.7 micrograms per cubic meter, much higher than the OECD average of 20.9 micrograms per cubic meter, and the annual guideline limit of 20 micrograms per cubic meter set by the World Health Organization." Although there is some monitoring of air pollution compared with other European countries, many air pollution indicators are not available. Regulations in Turkey do not contain any restrictions on the pollutant PM 2.5, which causes lung diseases. Greenpeace Mediterranean claim that the Afşin-Elbistan coal-fired plant is the power plant with the highest health risk in Europe, followed by the Soma coal-fired power plant, also in Turkey.

=== Waste disposal ===
As of 2016 many municipalities use substandard dumps to dispose of waste.

=== Noise ===
Environmental noise data is not reported.

=== Climate change ===
Summer temperatures have increased and are expected to continue to increase due to climate change. Coal in Turkey emits a third of the country's greenhouse gas.

=== Water ===
==== Pollution ====
Untreated waste water is a cause of marine mucilage in the Marmara Sea. Organic pollution of streams is a problem. There is a potential for spills from the 5,000 oil- and gas-carrying ships that pass through the Bosporus annually.

==== Drought ====
Turkey is at risk of water shortages. Almost three quarters of water that is consumed is used for irrigation in agriculture.

=== Land degradation ===
Land degradation is a critical agricultural problem, caused by inappropriate use of agricultural land, overgrazing, or over-fertilization. Serious soil erosion has occurred in 69% of Turkey's land surface. A national soil information system is being developed as presently 'it is difficult to assess the levels of land degradation, desertification or soil contamination'.

=== Green space in cities ===
Former military land in cities may be rezoned for housing.

== Laws and regulations ==
The Ministry of Environment, Urbanisation and Climate Change is responsible. The first Integrated Pollution Prevention and Control permits are expected to be issued in 2024, to use best available techniques but to use the least stringent emission levels (of those specified in EU 2017–1442). In 2021 ships were banned from using open-loop scrubbers in national waters.

The European Pollutant Release and Transfer Register (E-PRTR) legislation was adopted in 2021 to be phased in. There is a pollutant release and transfer register website but as of September 2024 no years are publicly searchable, because it is not yet technically complete (see FAQ). In 2024 a draft similar to the EU green taxonomy was published.

== Politics ==
Environmental issues are becoming more politically sensitive. Changes in the law on environmental impact assessments are being considered which will permit mining investments without waiting for environmental impact assessments. The EU has asked for "a stronger political commitment". In 2019 Turkey was one of five countries which voted against the proposed UN Global Pact for the Environment.

A green deal action plan was written mainly by the Trade Ministry and published in 2021, but according to the Health and Environment Alliance it does not set any tangible targets or deadlines.

== Economics ==
Ecotaxes on gasoline, diesel fuel and vehicles cover the social cost of carbon from the road transport sector, however being nationwide they are not designed to cover the negative externality of health costs due to local air pollution in cities. As of 2025 import taxes on gasoline cars are lower than on electric cars.

=== Subsidies ===
Turkey continues to provide substantial environmentally harmful subsidies, such as subsidies for poor families to use coal for heating.

== Restrictions on public access to information ==
Turkey is not a party to the Aarhus Convention, and the EU and OECD say the government should remove restrictions on access to environmental information: researchers say the government is punishing them for publishing information about pollution.

== See also ==
- Polluting Paradise, a 2012 documentary film about the village of Çamburnu, which has been turned into a rubbish dump by the government
- 2013 protests in Turkey, which were sparked by environmental issues
- TEMA Foundation, an environmental organisation
- 2025 Turkey water crisis

== Sources ==
- "OECD Environmental Performance Reviews: Turkey 2019". OECD. February 2019. doi:10.1787/9789264309753-en. ISBN 9789264309746. S2CID 242969625.
- "Turkey 2019 Report" (PDF). European Commission. May 2019.
- The European environment — state and outlook 2020 (Report). European Environment Agency (EEA). 2019.
