= List of ecoregions in Turkey =

The following is a list of ecoregions in Turkey as maintained by One Earth. Alternatively part of Turkey is included by the European Environment Agency: Black Sea Biogeographic Region, Anatolian Biogeographic Region and Mediterranean Biogeographic Region.

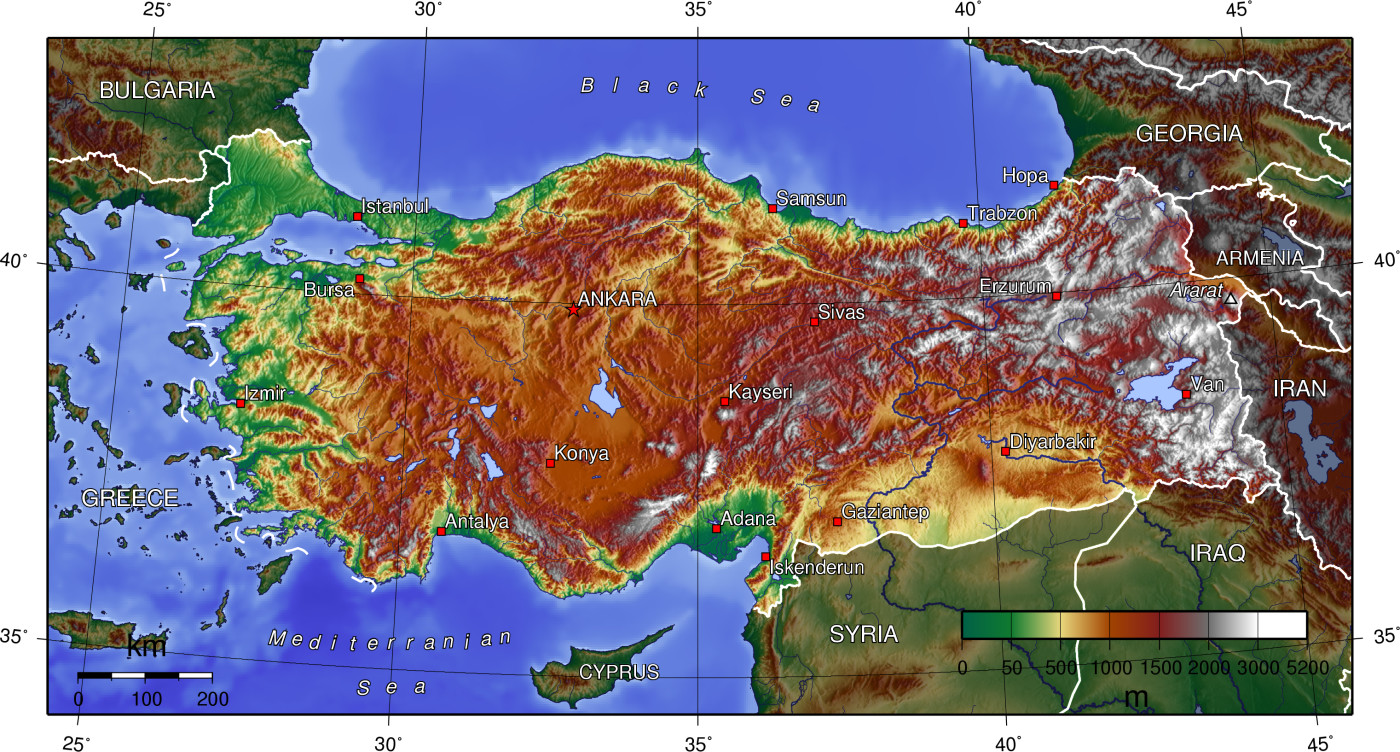
Topographic map of Turkey with the Aegean Sea to the west, the Black Sea to the north and the Mediterranean to the south

The geography of Turkey is roughly rectangular, being more than 1,600 km (990 mi) east-west and 800 km (500 mi) north-south. Turkey's 783,562 km^{2} (302,535 sq mi) of land is divided into two parts by the Bosphorus, the Sea of Marmara and the Dardanelles; European Turkey makes up only 3% of the country, with the rest being in Asia and often known as Anatolia.

The country has varied topography with fertile coastal plains contrasting with mountainous regions in the centre and eastern part of the country. The climate of Turkey also varies, with the weather systems found near the coasts contrasting with those prevailing in the interior. The Aegean and Mediterranean coasts have hot, dry summers and cool, rainy winters. The interior of the country has a continental climate with severe weather on the Anatolian plateau in winter and hot, dry summers. These large differences in climate are reflected in an extremely diverse wildlife.

Because it is mountainous the country has a lot of biomes. The ecoregions of Turkey include the important terrestrial Eastern Anatolian deciduous forests and Southern Anatolian montane conifer and deciduous forests. There are also small areas of bottomland forest. Turkey includes portions of three biodiversity hotspots: the Mediterranean Basin, the Caucasus, and the Irano-Anatolian.

== Terrestrial ==
Turkey is in the Palearctic realm. Ecoregions are sorted by biome (bioregion).

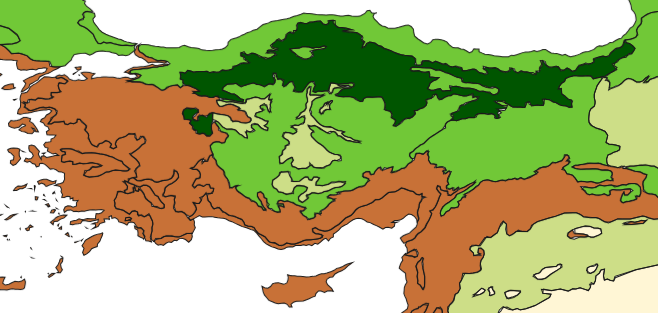
Biomes of TurkeyZagros Mountain Forests & East Anatolian Steppe Bioregion Black Sea, Caucasus-Anatolian Mixed Forests & Steppe Bioregion Aegean Sea & East Mediterranean Mixed Forests Bioregion Balkan Mixed Forests Ecoregion

=== Dinaric Mountains & Balkan Mixed Forests Bioregion ===
- Balkan mixed forests (Bulgaria, Greece, North Macedonia, Romania, Serbia, Turkey)

=== Black Sea, Caucasus-Anatolian Mixed Forests & Steppe Bioregion ===
- Central Anatolian steppe (Turkey)
- Northern Anatolian conifer and deciduous forests (Turkey)
- Euxine-Colchic deciduous forests (Georgia, Turkey, Bulgaria)
- Eastern Anatolian deciduous forests (Turkey)
- Central Anatolian deciduous forests (Turkey)
- Caucasus mixed forests (Armenia, Azerbaijan, Georgia, Russia, Turkey)

=== Aegean Sea & East Mediterranean Mixed Forests Bioregion ===
- Aegean and Western Turkey sclerophyllous and mixed forests (Greece, North Macedonia, Turkey)
- Anatolian conifer and deciduous mixed forests (Turkey)
- Eastern Mediterranean conifer-broadleaf forests (Israel, Jordan, Lebanon, Palestine, Syria, Turkey)
- Southern Anatolian montane conifer and deciduous forests (Israel, Jordan, Lebanon, Syria, Turkey)

=== Zagros Mountain Forests & East Anatolian Steppe Bioregion ===
- Eastern Anatolian montane steppe (Turkey, Iran, Armenia, Georgia, Azerbaijan)
- Zagros Mountains forest steppe (Iran, Iraq, Turkey)

== Freshwater ==
- Central Anatolia
- Kura-South Caspian drainages
- Lake Van
- Northern Anatolia
- Orontes
- Southern Anatolia
- Thrace (freshwater)
- Upper Tigris and Euphrates
- Western Anatolia
- Western Transcaucasia
- Dniester - Lower Danube

== Marine ==
- Aegean Sea
- Black Sea
- Levantine Sea
