= List of ecoregions in Bulgaria =

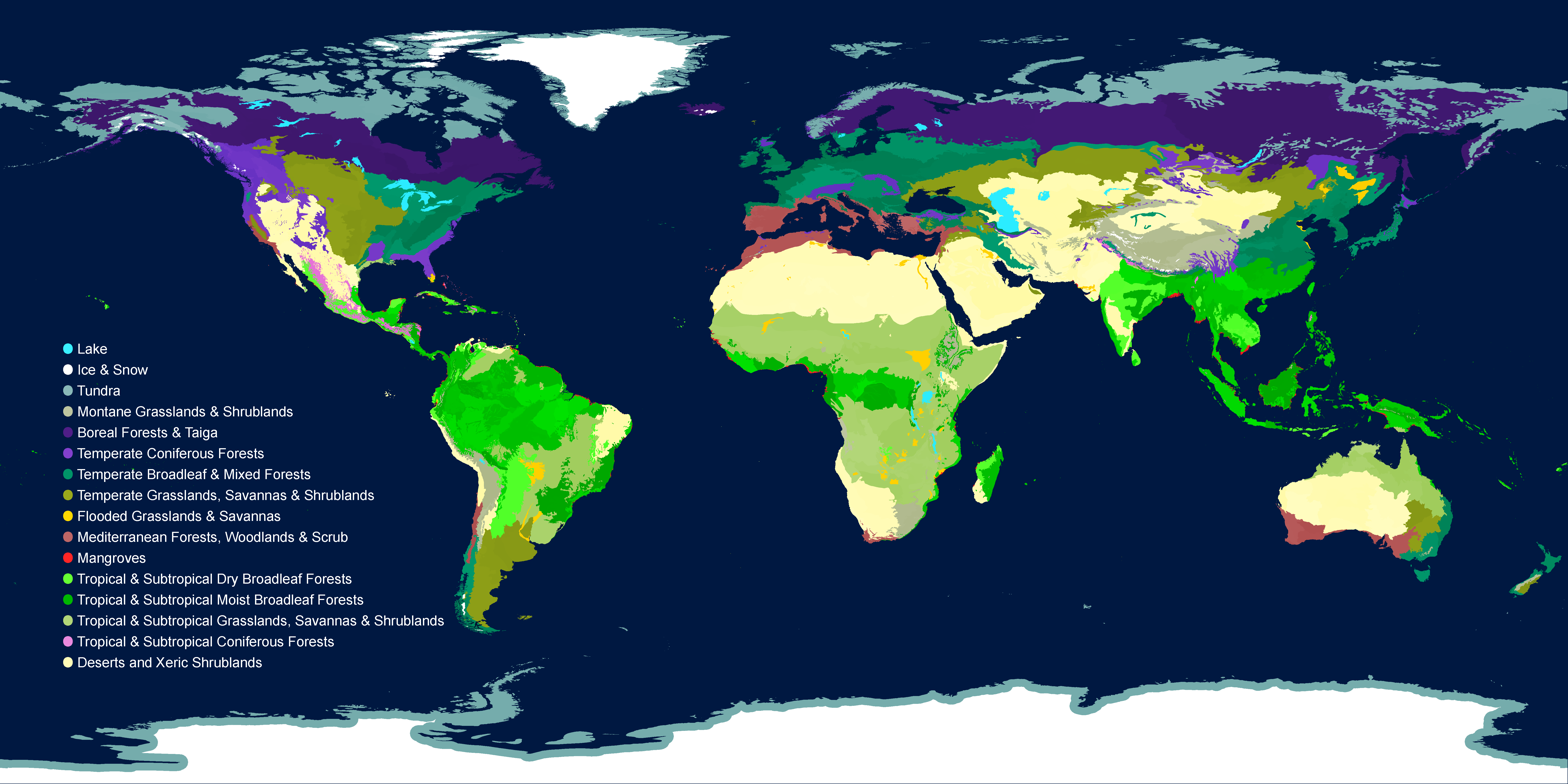
WWF Global 200 ecoregions

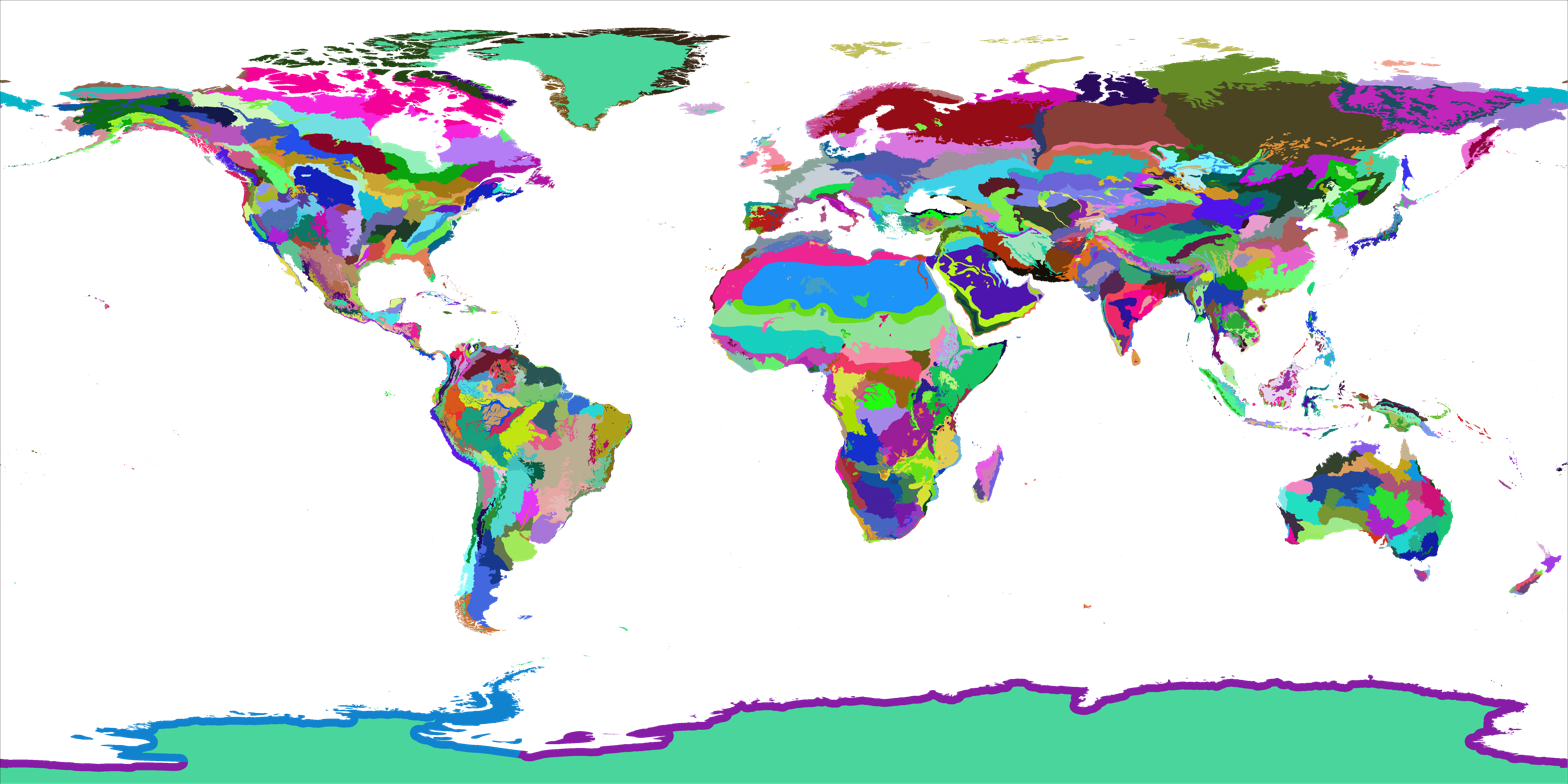
WWF terrestrial ecoregions

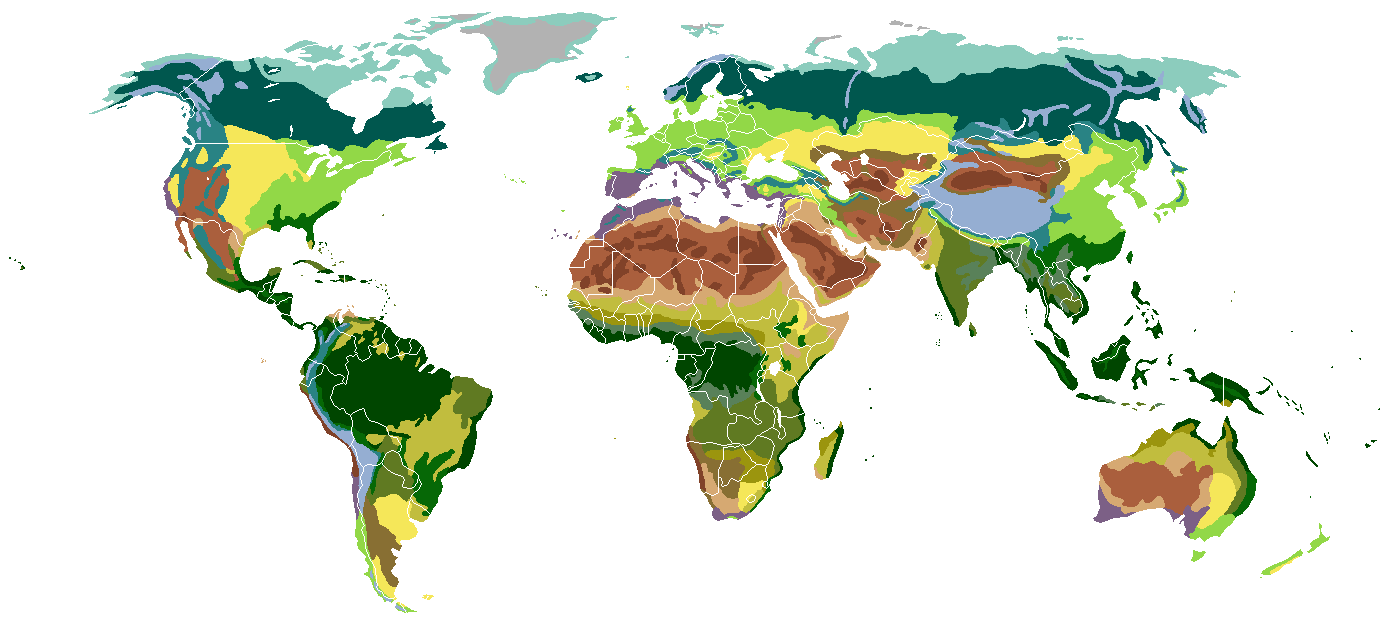
Terrestrial biomes classified by vegetation

Map of drainage systems and drainage divide in Bulgaria

This is a list of the ecoregions in Bulgaria - terrestrial ecoregions and freshwater ecoregions as defined by the World Wildlife Fund and the Marine Ecoregions of the World—MEOW global classification system.

== Biogeography ==
Broadly, Bulgarian nature belongs to the Palearctic realm. The freshwater ecoregions in Bulgaria are examples for temperate coastal rivers habitat (one of the twelve major types of freshwater ecoregions) and form part of the Eurafrican Mediterranean Sea Freshwater biogeographic realm. The European Environment Agency classifies different parts of Bulgaria as belonging to the Continental, Alpine and Black Sea biogeographic regions. The Black Sea marine ecoregion is classified as part of the Mediterranean–Atlantic region marine biogeographic realm according to Briggs (1995) or, alternatively, to the Temperate Northern Atlantic marine realm according to the WWF scheme (Spalding, 2007).

== Biomes ==
Apart from the 4 Marine world biomes, the terrestrial biomes that can be found in Bulgaria are: temperate deciduous forest, temperate coniferous forest (Taiga in the mountains), Woodland, Tundra (Alpine tundra in the highest mountains, being Snezhnika glacier (41°46′09″) in Pirin massif the southernmost glacial mass in Europe,) Chaparral or Shrubland in the south-western corner of Bulgaria., and Grassland in Dobruja, which is 6 out of the 9 world terrestrial biomes (according to the classification of the terrestrial biomes proposed by Kendeigh (1961). With a relatively limited territory of 110 993 km^{2}., Bulgaria presents diverse nature with great variety of biomes, habitats and ecoregions, thanks to its peninsular location, varied topography and climate, coasts and rivers. The interaction of complex climatic, hydrological, geological and topographical conditions make Bulgaria one of the most biologically diverse countries of Europe.

This list may not reflect all the relevant information.

== Terrestrial ecoregions ==
- Aegean and Western Turkey sclerophyllous and mixed forests
- Balkan mixed forests (main ecoregion)
- East European forest steppe
- Euxine-Colchic deciduous forests
- Pontic (Black Sea) steppe
- Rodope montane mixed forests (main ecoregion in the mountains)

== Freshwater ecoregions ==
Temperate coastal rivers

- 423 Thrace

Temperate floodplain rivers and wetlands

- 418 Dniester - Lower Danube

== Marine ecoregions ==
- Black Sea marine ecoregion

== Gallery ==
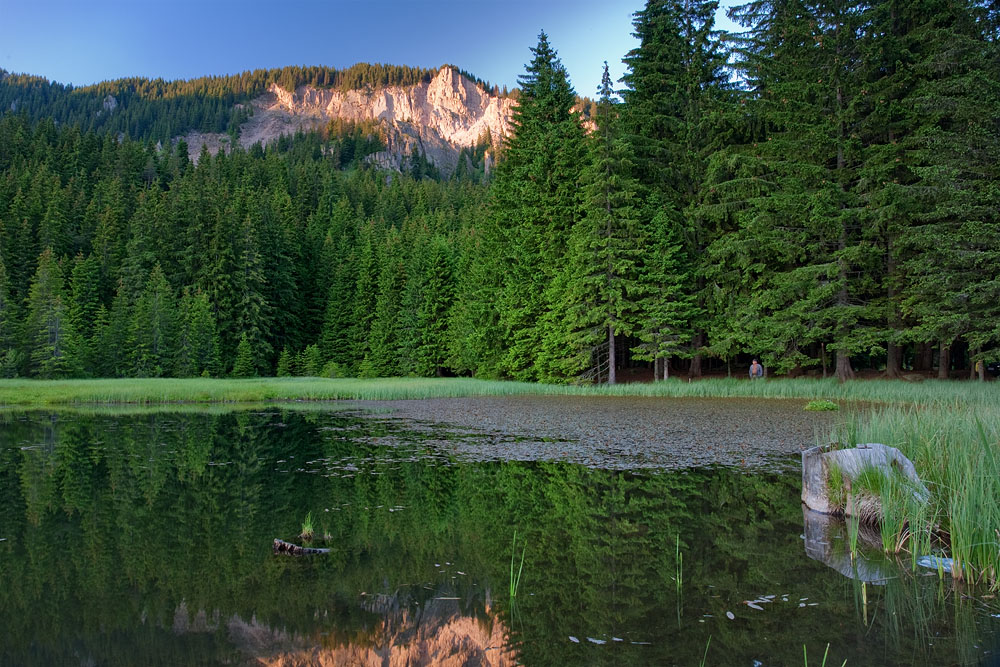
Forests near Smolyan in the Rhodope Mountains

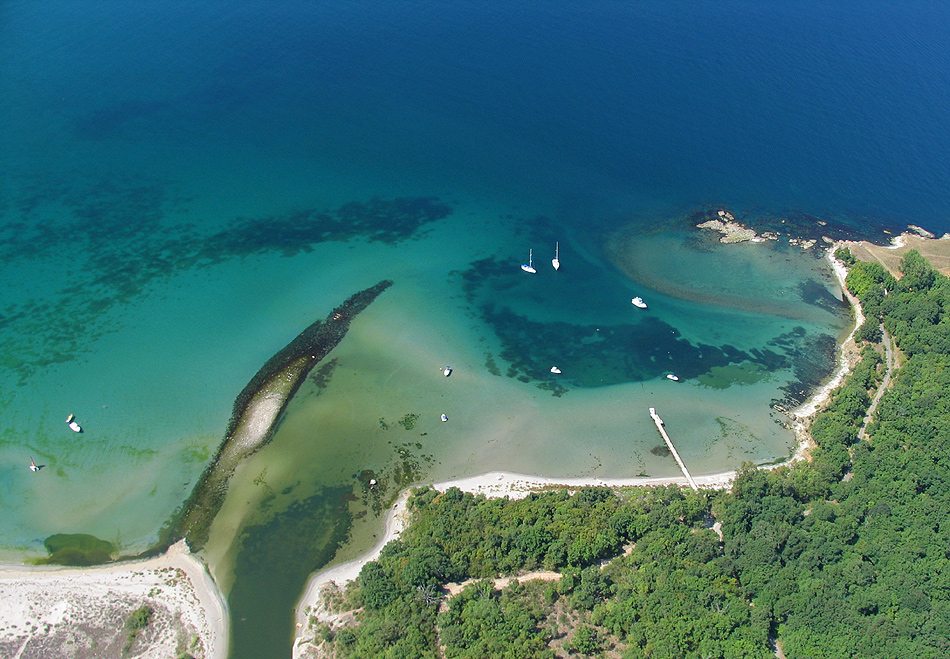
The coastline at the river Ropotamo

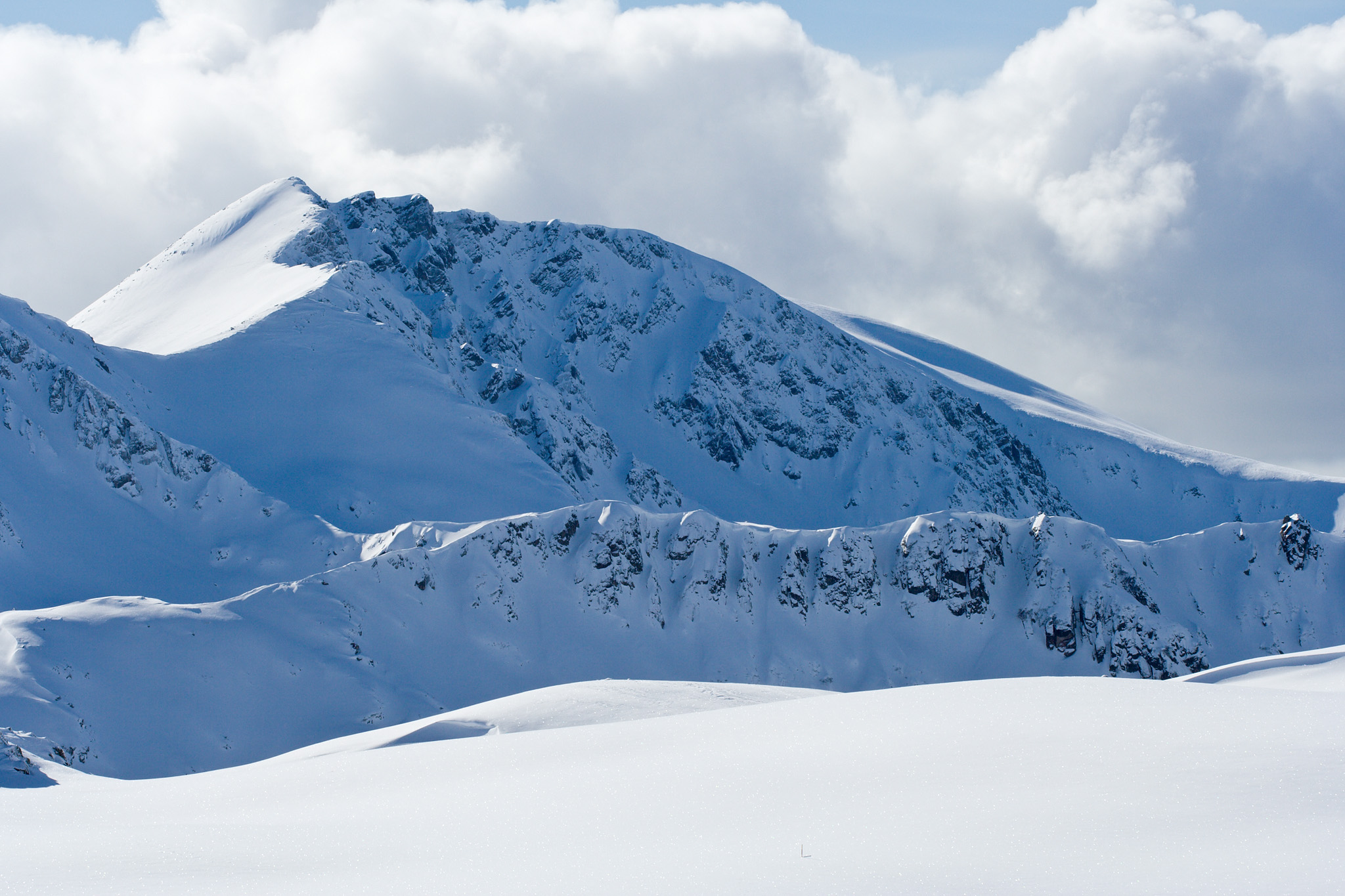
The snow cover in Pirin mountain lasts for nearly 8 months

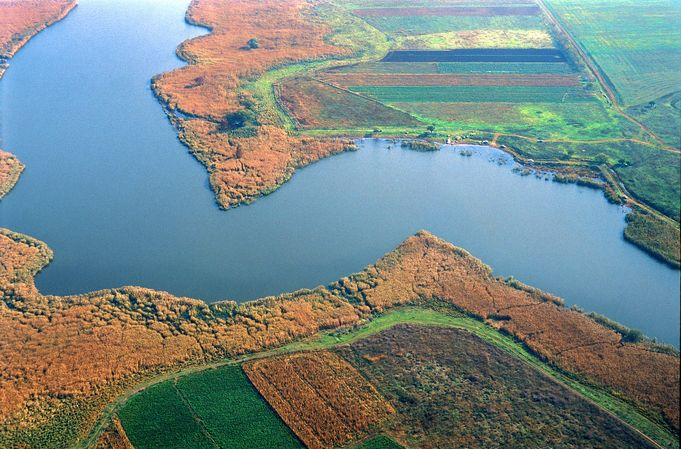
Lake Shabla

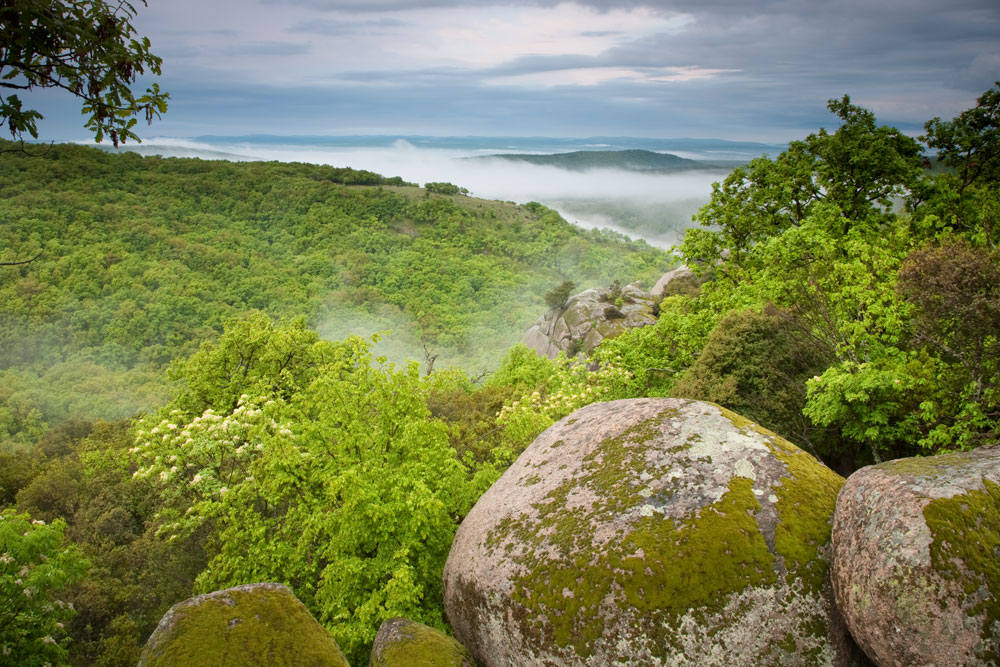
A forest habitat near Strandzha Nature Park, southeastern Bulgaria

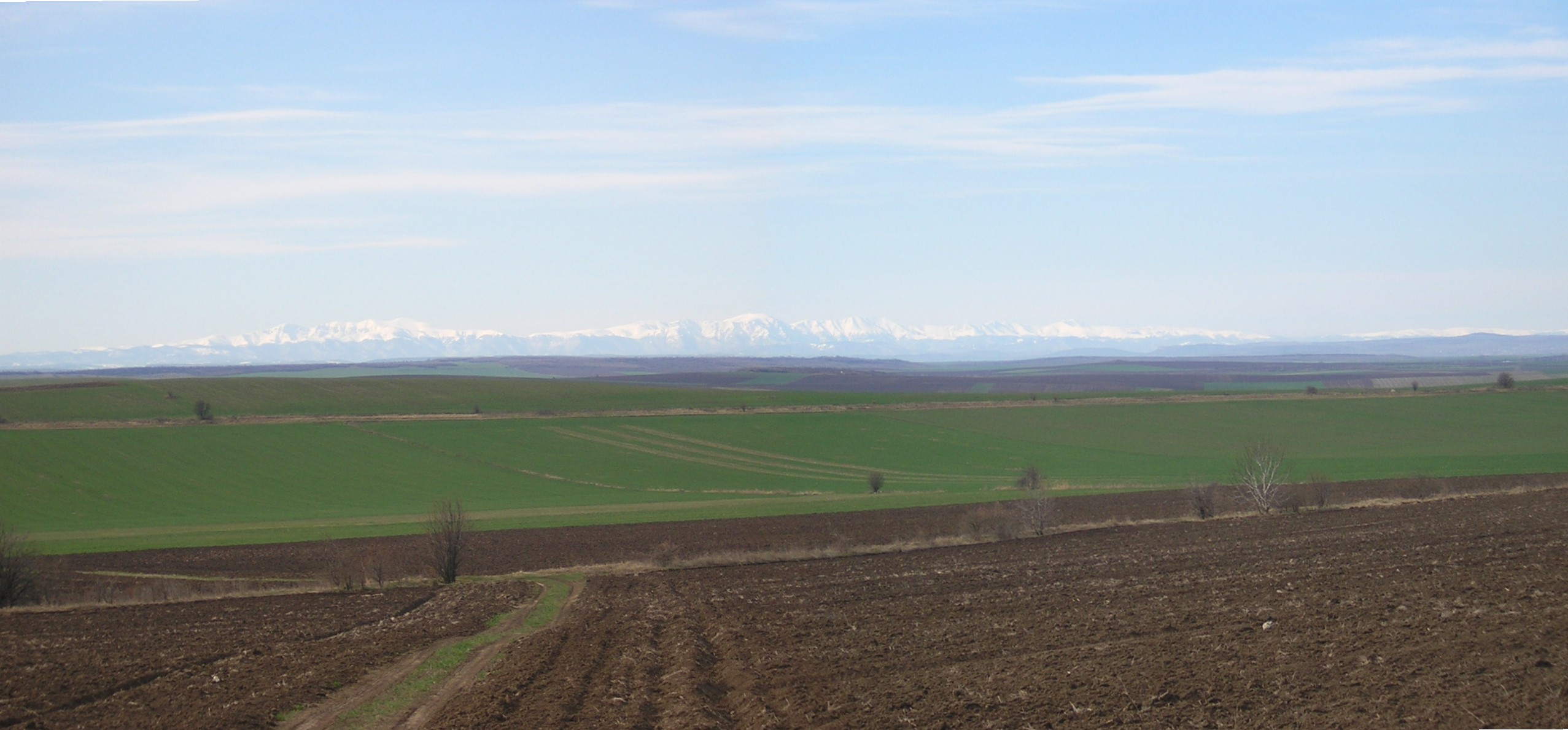
View across the Danubian Plain (Bulgaria) towards the central Balkan Mountains 90 km away

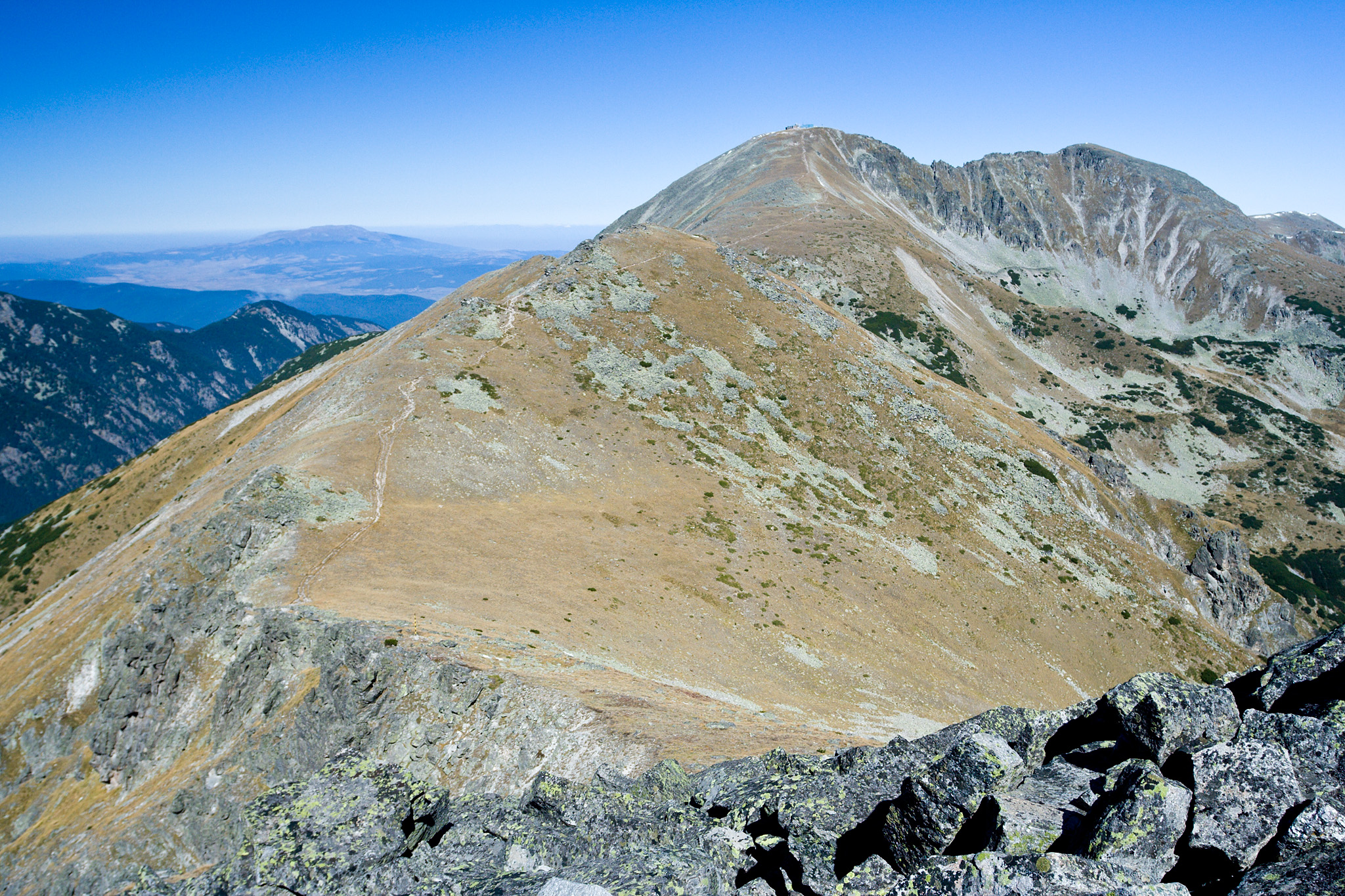
Peak Musala

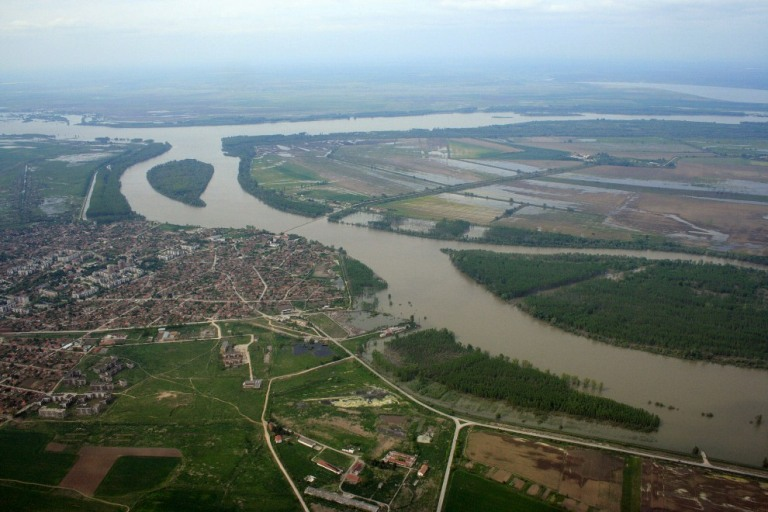
Belene Island, Danube River

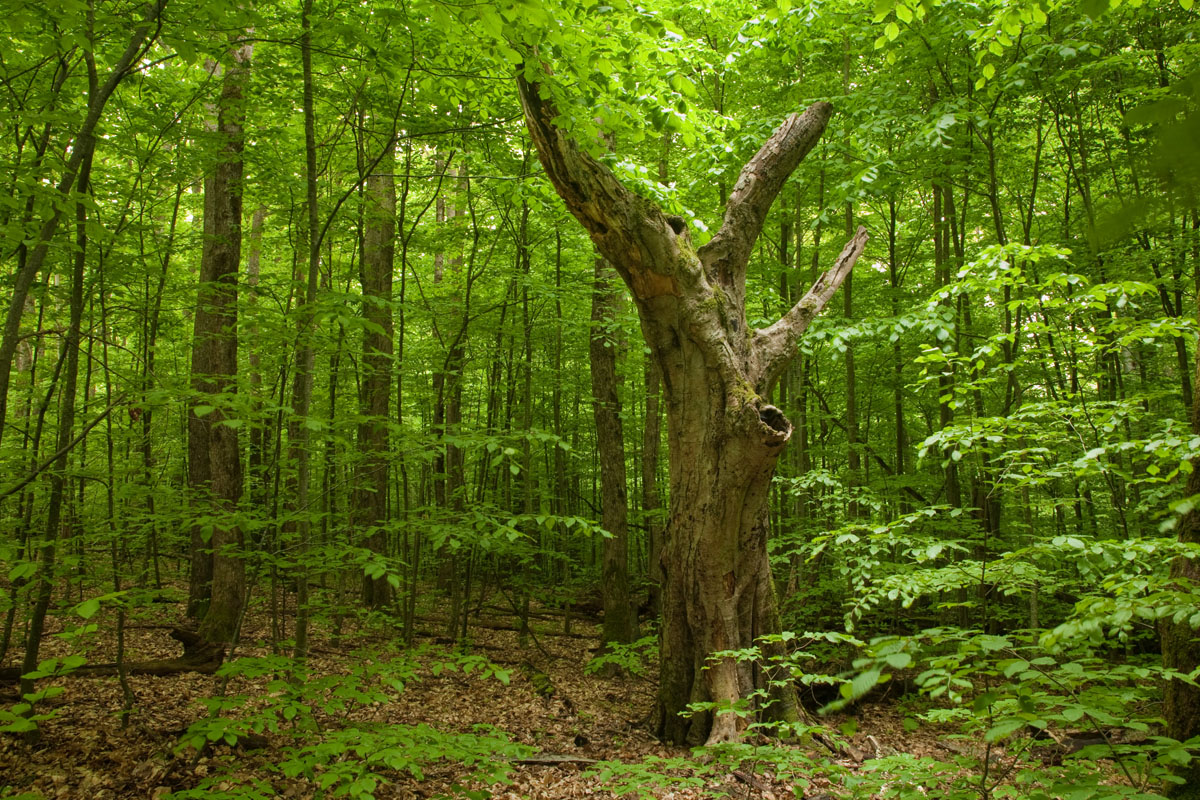
A Euxine forest in Strandzha Nature Park

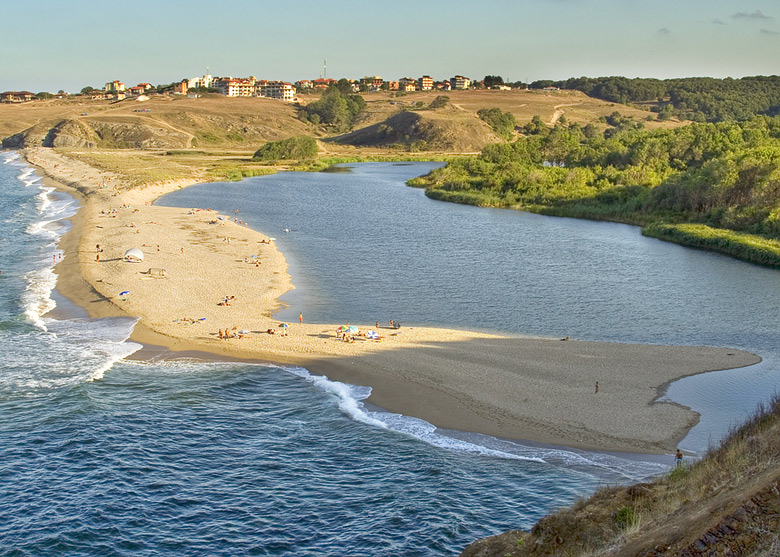
The Veleka River mouth at Sinemorets

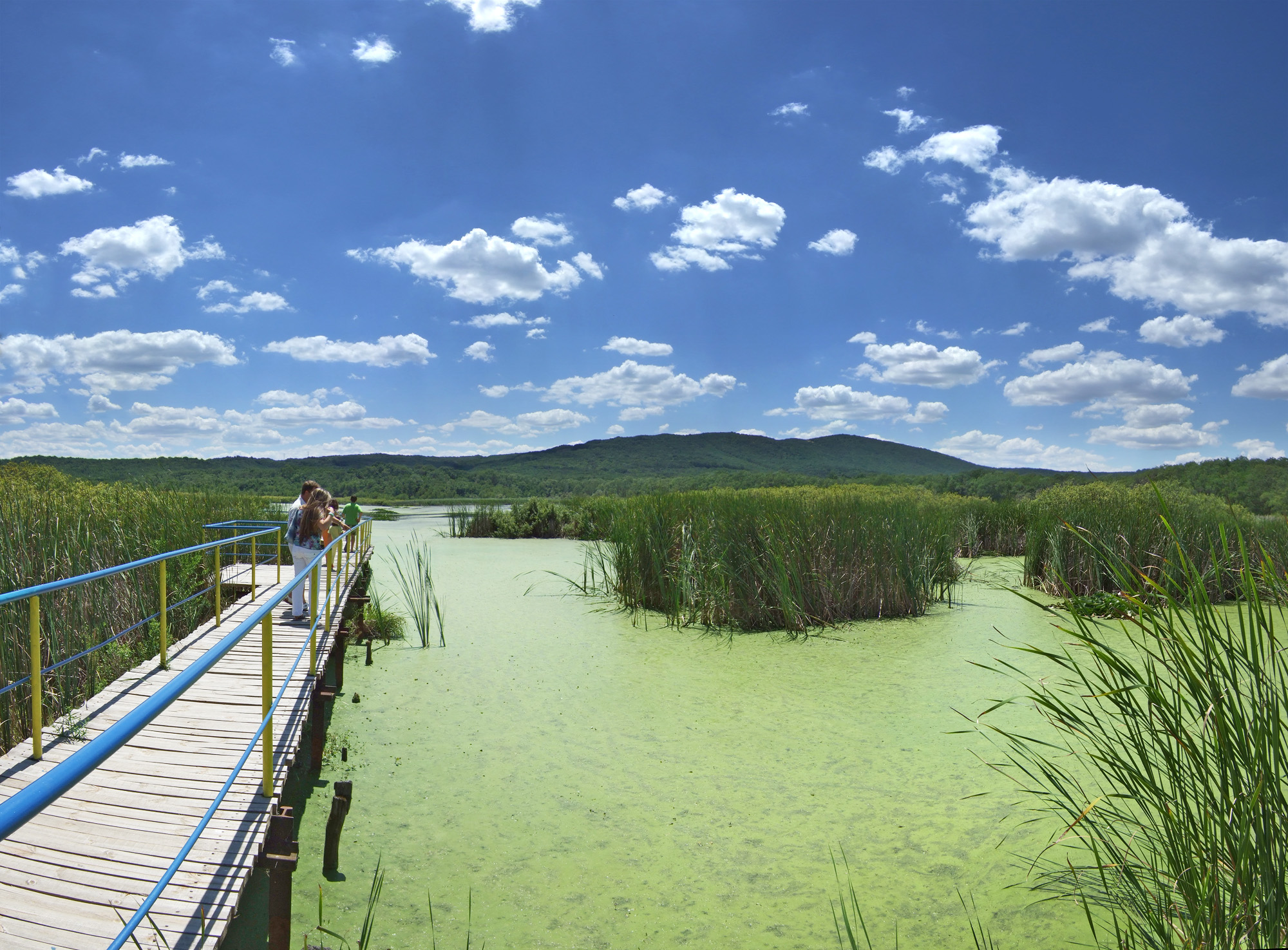
Arkutino

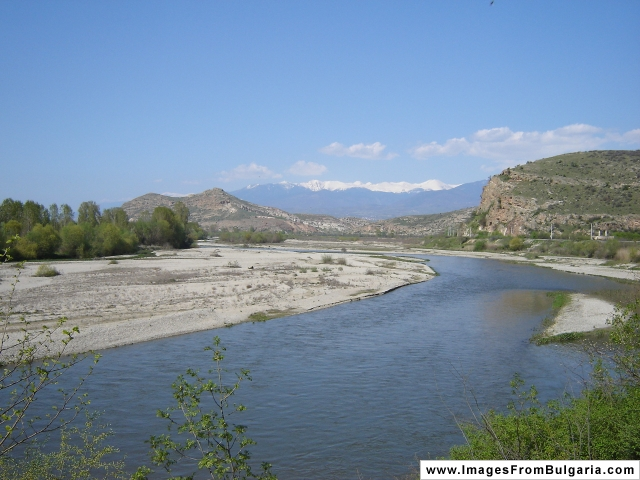
Struma (river) valley

== See also ==
- Geography of Bulgaria
- List of protected areas of Bulgaria
