= Fennoscandia =

Geographical peninsula in Europe

Fennoskandien (Swedish); Fennoskandia (Finnish, Norwegian, Karelian, Veps); Feennaskandii (Northern Sami, Lule Sami, Southern Sami); Fennoskandiija (Inari Sami); Fääʹnnoskandd (Skolt Sami); Фенноскандия (Russian)
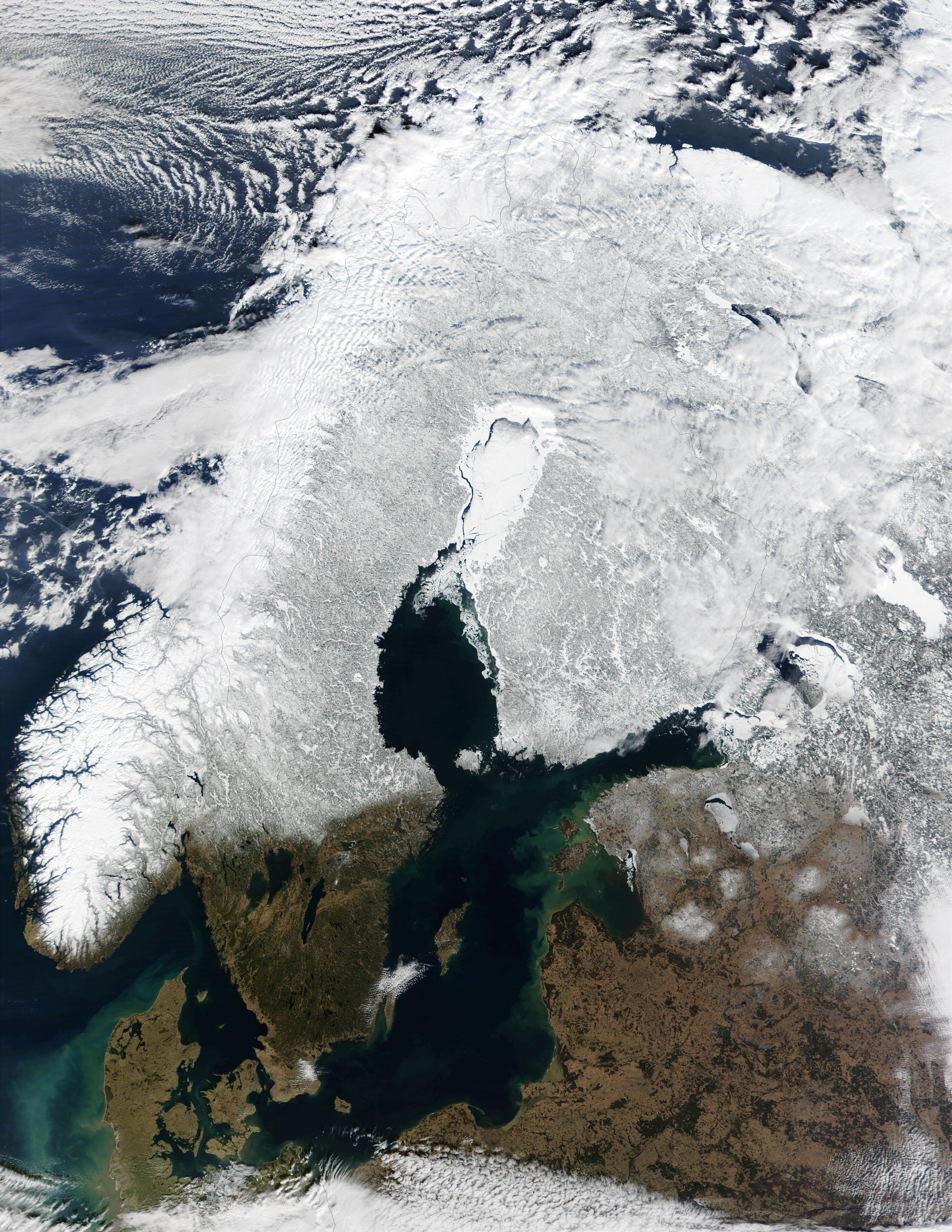
- Fennoscandia in March 2002

Geography
- Location: Northern Europe
- Coordinates: 63°N 17°E
- Adjacent to: Arctic Sea, Atlantic Ocean
- Highest elevation: 2,469 m (8100 ft)
- Highest point: Galdhøpiggen

Administration
- Norway
- Sweden
- Finland
- Autonomous regions: Åland
- Russia
- Republics of Russia: Murmansk Oblast, Republic of Karelia, and parts of Leningrad Oblast

Demographics
- Languages: Norwegian; Swedish; Finnish; Sámi; Russian; Kven; Meänkieli; Karelian; Veps; Northern Sámi; Lule Sámi; Southern Sámi; Inari Sámi; Skolt Sámi; Romani; Scandoromani

Fennoscandia (Finnish, Swedish and Norwegian: Fennoskandia; Russian: Фенноскандия, romanized: Fennoskandiya), Fenno-Scandinavia, or the Fennoscandian Peninsula, is a peninsula in Europe which includes the Scandinavian and Kola peninsulas, mainland Finland, and Karelia. Administratively, this roughly encompasses the mainlands of Finland, Norway and Sweden, as well as Murmansk Oblast, the Republic of Karelia, and parts of northern Leningrad Oblast in Russia.

== Usage history ==
Its name comes from the Latin words Fennia (Finland) and Scandia (Scandinavia). The term was first used by the Finnish geologist Wilhelm Ramsay in 1898. Geologically, the area is distinct because its bedrock is Archean granite and gneiss with very little limestone, in contrast to adjacent areas in Europe.

=== Biology ===
In biology, the term is often limited to Norway, Sweden and Finland. Fennoscandia is not a distinct biogeographical region.

=== Politics and culture ===
The term is sometimes used to refer to a cultural or political grouping of Finland with the Scandinavian countries of Sweden, Norway and Denmark. The broader term Nordic region also encompasses Iceland, as well as the autonomous territories of Åland, the Faroe Islands and Greenland.

== See also ==
- Baltoscandia – Geopolitical concept
- Cap of the North – Region in Northern Europe
- Scandinavia – Subregion of northern Europe
- Sápmi – Sámi cultural region of Fennoscandia
