= Macaronesian Biogeographic Region =

Biogeographic region

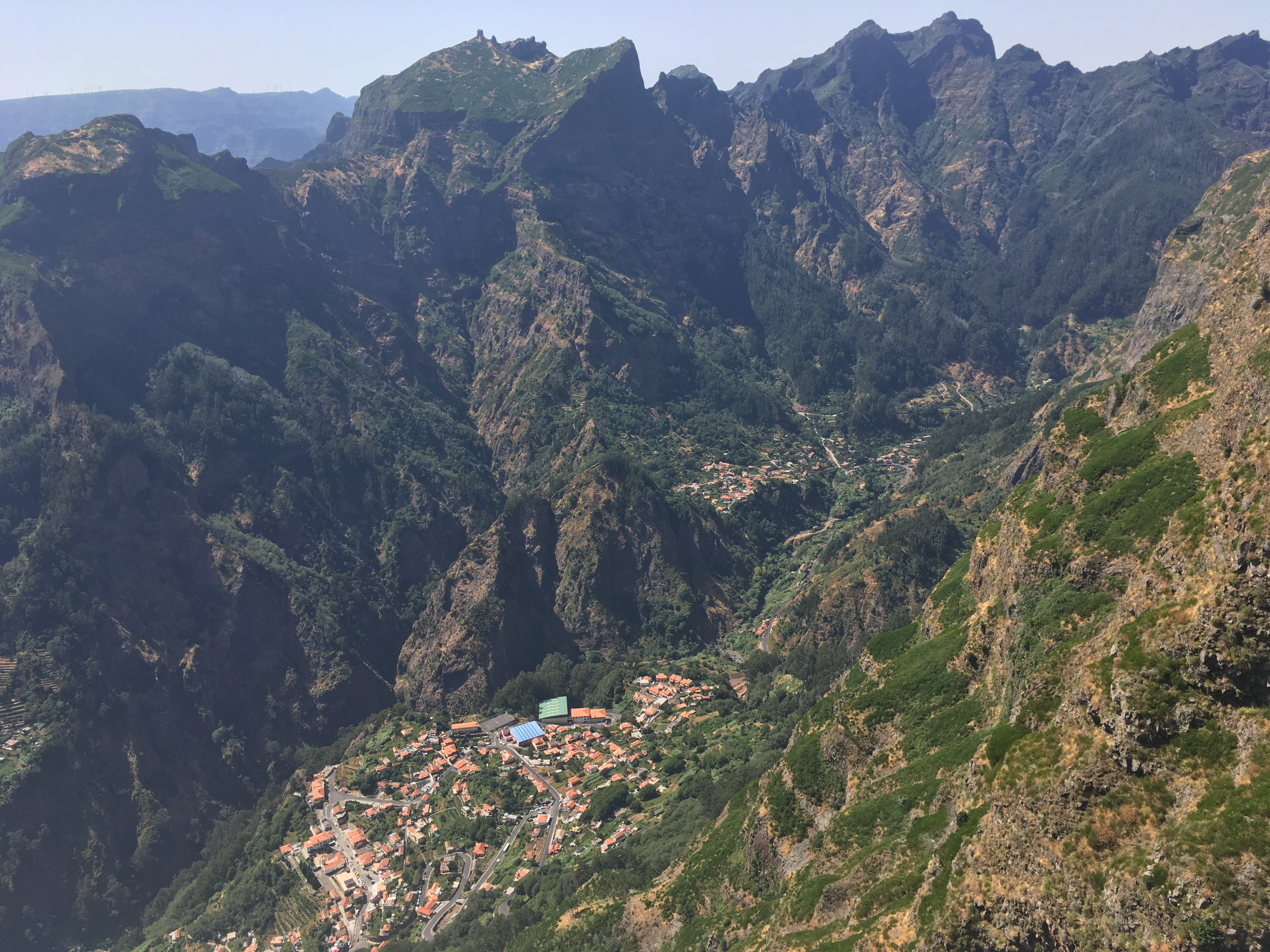
- Curral das Freiras, Madeira

- Biogeographic regions of Europe, as defined by the European Environment Agency; Macaronesian (inset)

Ecology
- Realm: Palearctic

Geography
- Countries: Portugal · Azores · Madeira; Spain · Canary Islands
- Oceans or seas: Atlantic Ocean

The Macaronesian Biogeographic Region is a biogeographic region, as defined by the European Environment Agency, that covers the Azores, the Canary Islands, and Madeira. The name comes from the group of four archipelagos collectively known as Macaronesia that also include Cape Verde, which is not included in the European region.

== Extent ==
The Macaronesian Biogeographic Region includes the Portuguese archipelagos of the Azores and Madeira, and the Spanish Canary Islands.

The Natura 2000 list of sites of Community importance for the region was the first such list to be adopted, in December 2001. It contained 208 sites covering over 5,000 square kilometres (1,900 sq mi) of land and sea. The list is updated every year. As of 14 December 2018 it contained 224 entries ranging from ES0000041 Ojeda, Inagua y Pajonales, 3,527.6 hectares (8,717 acres) at 27.9438°N 15.6985°W to PTTER0018 Costa das Quatro Ribeiras — Ilha da Terceira, 267.63 hectares (661.3 acres) at 38.80°N 27.21°W.

== Environment ==
The archipelagos all have a volcanic origin, complex landscape and gentle climate, and have rich biodiversity.

== Sources ==
- "C(2018) 8532 Commission Implementing Decision (EU) 2019/20 of 14 December 2018 adopting the seventh update of the list of sites of Community importance for the Macaronesian biogeographical region", Official Journal of the European Union
- The Macaronesian Region, European Commission
