= Pannonian Biogeographic Region =

Lowland region centred on Hungary

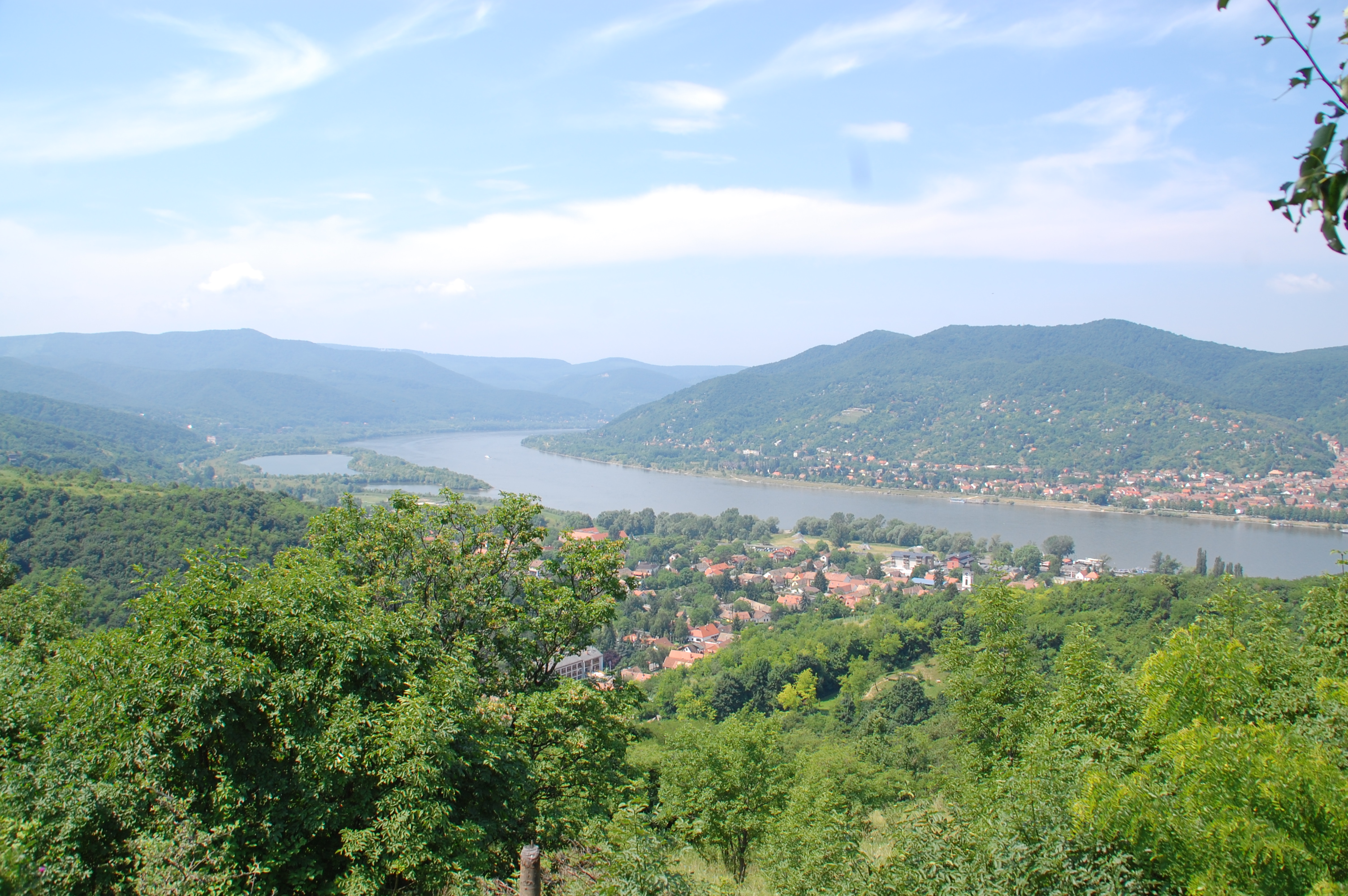
- Danube to the north of Budapest

- Biogeographic regions of Europe, as defined by the European Environment Agency; Pannonian

Ecology
- Realm: Palearctic

Geography
- Countries: Hungary, Slovakia, the Czech Republic, Romania, Serbia, Croatia, Ukraine
- Rivers: Danube, Tisza

The Pannonian Biogeographic Region is a biogeographic region, as defined by the European Environment Agency. It covers the lowlands of the Pannonian Basin centered on Hungary.

== Extent ==
The Pannonian Region is a large alluvial basin surrounded by the Carpathian Mountains to the north and east, the Alps to the west and the Dinaric Alps to the south. The basin was once the bed of an inland sea. It is flat, and is crossed from north to south by the Danube and Tisza rivers. The region contains all of Hungary, and around the periphery contains parts of Slovakia, the Czech Republic, Romania, Serbia, Croatia, Bosnia and Herzegovina and Ukraine.

== Environment ==
The region is sheltered by the mountains, but has complex weather caused by the interaction of wet winds from the west, drier winds from the south and cooler winds from the Carpathians and Alps, which sometimes results in severe storms. The basin was once largely forested, with many marshes and shallow lakes, but has long been cleared and drained to make way for grasslands and cultivation. It contains inland sand dunes, sand steppes, loess grasslands and maple-oak loess forests., and significantly overlaps with the Pannonian mixed forests ecoregion.

== Sources ==
- Pannonian Biogeographical Region, European Commission
- Sundseth, Kerstin (2009), Natura 2000 in the Pannonian Region (PDF), European Commission Environment Directorate General, doi:10.2779/79432, ISBN 978-92-79-11586-8
