= Black Sea Biogeographic Region =

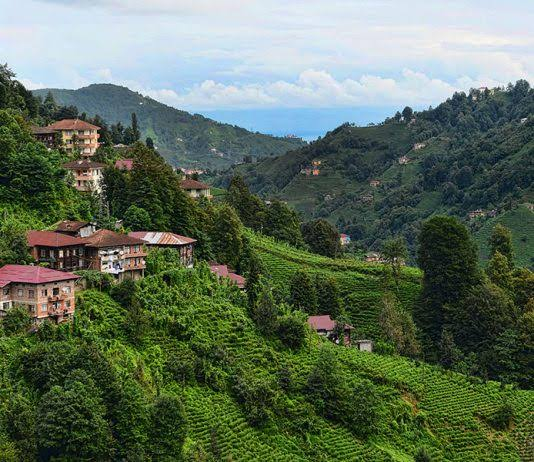
- Rize, Northern Turkey

- Biogeographic regions of Europe, as defined by the European Environment Agency; Black Sea

Ecology
- Realm: Palearctic

Geography
- Country: Mostly Turkey, Romania, Bulgaria, and Georgia
- Rivers: Kizilirmak, Sakarya

The Black Sea Biogeographic Region is a biogeographic region of land bordering the west and south of the Black Sea, as defined by the European Environment Agency .

== Extent ==
The Black Sea Region is a coastal strip of land 20–60 kilometres (12–37 mi) wide that runs along the coasts of Romania, Bulgaria, and a broader coastal strip in northern Turkey and Georgia. The coastline has rocky bays and sea cliffs, but is dominated by long stretches of low sand dunes and beaches sloping into the Black Sea.

== Environment ==
The sea has a moderating effect on the climate, so temperatures do not fall much below 0 °C (32 °F) in winter, and are not as high in the summer as in area further inland. The Kaliakra cliffs in the north of Bulgaria are rich in flora, including many species in common with the neighboring Steppic and Mediterranean Regions. The western Black Sea Region is the Via Pontica, Europe's second largest bird migration route. The migrating birds use the coastal lakes, marshes and lagoons behind the shoreline, and some spend the winter in these wetlands. The Danube Delta is the best known of the wetlands.

In Bulgaria and Romania the region is threatened by development of agriculture, industry, urbanization and tourism. The Black Sea itself, a very deep inland sea, is poor in oxygen and supports very little marine life in the deeper regions. However, it had a productive fishery until the 1960s, when stocks crashed in part because of over-fishing and in part from pollution and invasion by exotic species.

== Conservation ==
The first list of Natura 2000 sites in the region was adopted in December 2008. This included 40 Sites of Community Importance under the Habitats Directive and 27 Special Protection Areas under the Birds Directive for the part of the Black Sea biogeographical region in the European Union. Some sites meet both criteria, so the total was less than 67. About half the land area was covered by the sites. As of 12 December 2017 there were 45 Sites of Community Importance. These were:

- Plazh Shkorpilovtsi
- Dolinata na reka Batova
- Galata
- Kamchia
- Zlatni pyasatsi
- Trite bratya
- Kraymorska Dobrudzha
- Pobitite kamani
- Kamchiyska i Emenska planina
- Reka Kamchia
- Karaagach
- Plazh Gradina - Zlatna ribka
- Aytoska planina
- Ezero Durankulak
- Sredetska reka
- Bosna
- Derventski vazvishenia
- Fakiyska reka
- Zaliv Chengene skele
- Atanasovsko ezero
- Mandra - Poda
- Burgasko ezero
- Kompleks Kaliakra
- Aheloy - Ravda - Nesebar
- Pomorie
- Ezero Shabla - Ezerets
- Ropotamo
- Emine - Irakli
- Strandzha
- Aladzha banka
- Emona
- Otmanli
- Delta Dunării
- Delta Dunării - zona marină
- Dunele marine de la Agigea
- Izvoarele sulfuroase submarine de la Mangalia
- Mlaștina Hergheliei - Obanul Mare și Peștera Movilei
- Pădurea Hagieni - Cotul Văii
- Plaja submersă Eforie Nord - Eforie Sud
- Vama Veche
- Zona marină de la Capul Tuzla
- Cap Aurora
- Costinesti
- Canionul Viteaz
- Lobul sudic al Câmpului de Phyllophora al lui Zernov

== Sources ==
- Black Sea Biogeographical Region, European Commission
- Fifth update of the list of sites of Community importance for the Black Sea biogeographical region, European Union, 12 December 2017
- Sundseth, Kerstin; Barova, Sylvia (2009), Natura 2000 in the Black Sea Region (PDF), European Commission Environment Directorate General, doi:10.2779/7908, ISBN 978-92-79-11585-1
