= Steppic Biogeographic Region =

Biogeographic region of Europe

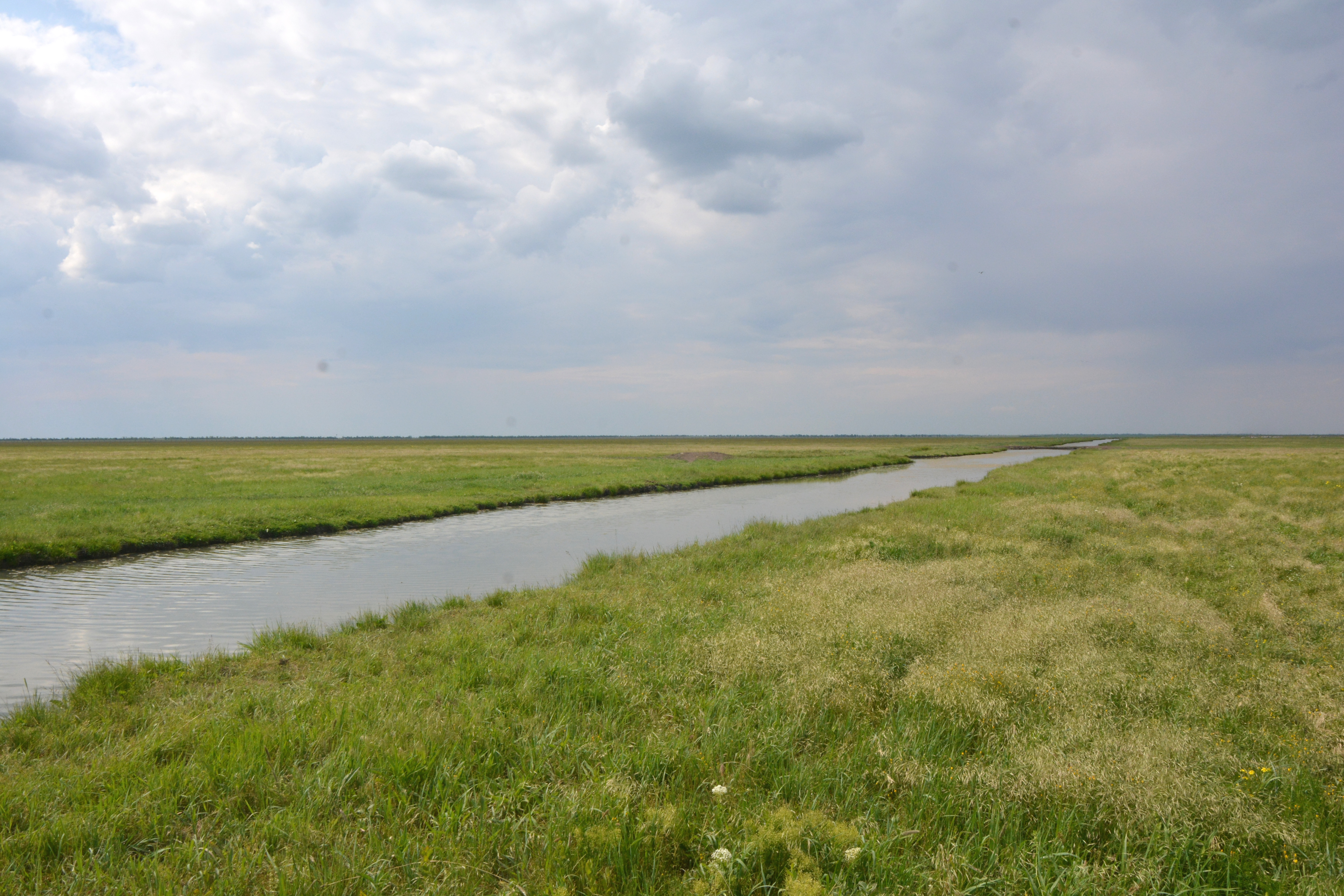
- Askania-Nova, Ukraine

- Biogeographic regions of Europe, as defined by the European Environment Agency; Steppic

Ecology
- Realm: Palearctic

Geography
- Countries: Romania, Moldova, Ukraine, Russia, Kazakhstan
- Oceans or seas: Black Sea, Caspian Sea

The Steppic Biogeographic Region is a biogeographic region of Europe, as defined by the European Environment Agency .

== Extent ==
The Steppic region encompasses parts of Romania, Moldova, Ukraine, Russia, and western Kazakhstan. Additionally, it extends further west into Asia. This vast region is characterized by low-lying plains, as well as rolling hills or plateaus. On average, the elevation in this area ranges from 200–300 metres (660–980 ft)

== Environment ==
The natural vegetation is mostly grasses such as Elymus repens (couch grass), Stipa (feather grass) and Festuca (fescue), among which are scattered herbaceous plants such as Potentilla (cinquefoil), Verbascum (mullein) and Artemisia (wormwood). The humus-rich soils are very fertile, and much of the region has been converted to cultivated land, with few remaining pockets of the original vegetation.

== Conservation ==
Romania has the only part of the Steppic Region in the European Union. This is a small intensively farmed area. The list of Natura 2000 sites in the region was adopted in December 2008, with 34 Sites of Community Importance under the Habitats Directive and 40 Special Protection Areas under the Birds Directive. Some sites are in both categories. Together they cover about 20% of the land in the Romanian part of the region.

== Sources ==
- Steppic Biogeographical Region, European Commission
- Sundseth, Kerstin (2009), Natura 2000 in the Steppic Region (PDF), European Commission Environment Directorate General, doi:10.2779/7833, ISBN 978-92-79-11584-4
