= Atlantic Biogeographic Region =

European region by the Atlantic

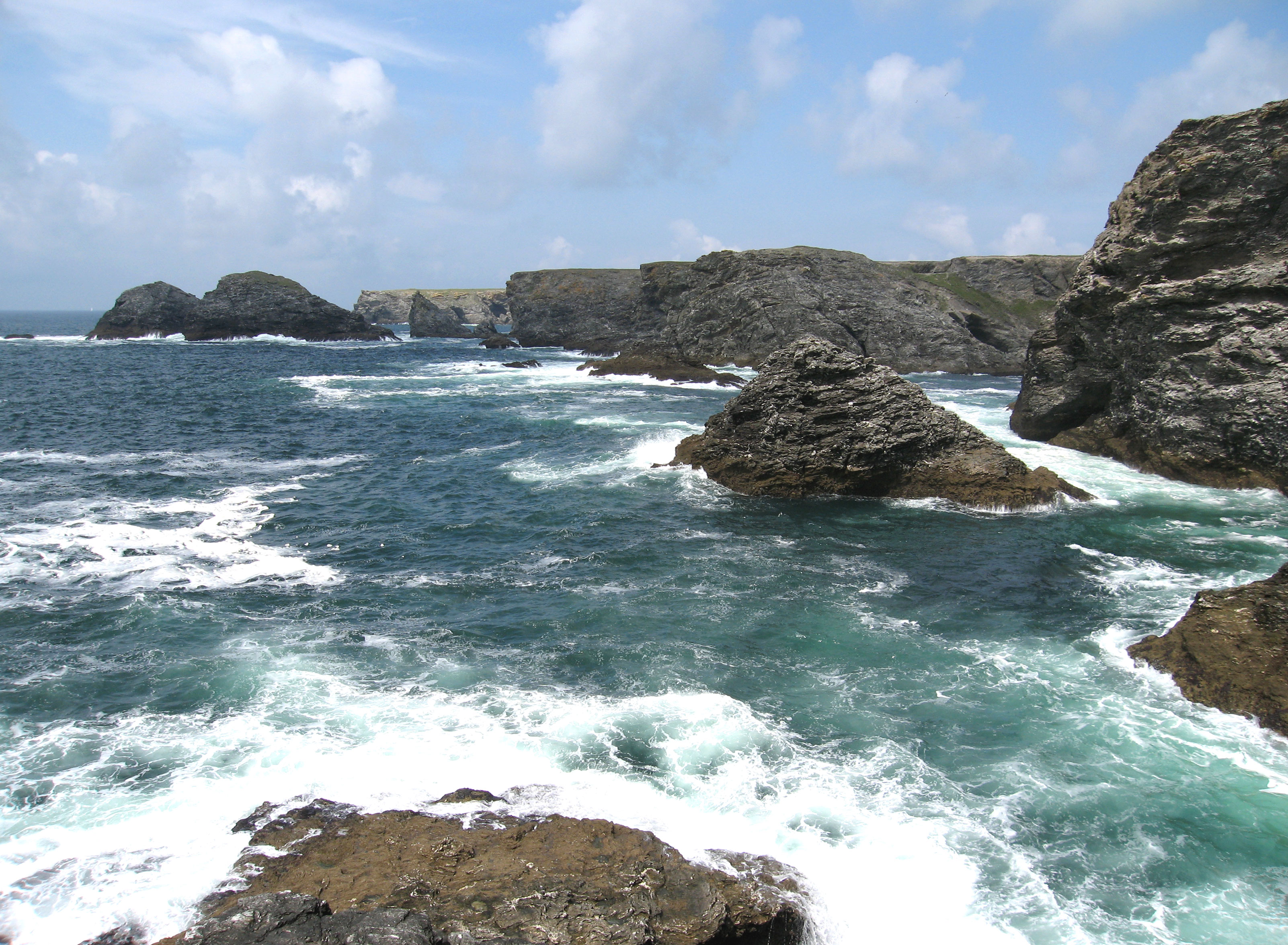
- Coast of Belle Ile, Bretagne, France

- Biogeographic regions of Europe, as defined by the European Environment Agency; Atlantic

Ecology
- Realm: Palearctic

Geography
- Oceans or seas: Atlantic Ocean, North Sea
- Rivers: Gironde, Loire, Rhine, Thames, Seine, Scheldt, Minho, Trent

The Atlantic Biogeographic Region is the biogeographic region of Europe bordering the Atlantic Ocean and the North Sea.

== Extent ==
The Atlantic Region borders the North Sea and the North-east Atlantic Ocean. It includes the United Kingdom, Ireland and the Netherlands, parts of Germany, Denmark, Belgium and France, and the northern shores of Spain and Portugal. The land is generally low elevation flat, and never more than 300 kilometres (190 mi) from the sea, with winds blowing from the west. As a result, it has an oceanic climate with mild winters and cool summers. There is moderate rainfall year-round.

== Environment ==
The long, indented coastline includes many habitats. Some areas have cliffs and rocky headlands with narrow tidal inlets, while others have sheltered bays with intertidal mudflats and sandy beaches. The land was ice-covered until 10,000 years ago, and species diversity is still lower than in other European biogeographic regions. Still, wildlife is abundant, including large flocks of migratory birds and many marine organisms fed by nutrients carried by the Gulf Stream from the Caribbean. Humans have drastically modified the land, with forests cleared for farming and large urbanized areas. Pollution is a problem on both land and sea, and over-fishing is also a threat.

== Sources ==
- Atlantic Biogeographical Region, European Commission
- Sundseth, Kerstin (2009), Natura 2000 in the Atlantic Region (PDF), European CommissionEnvironment Directorate General, doi:10.2779/82343, ISBN 978-92-79-11728-2
