= Arctic Biogeographic Region =

Biogeographic region of Europe

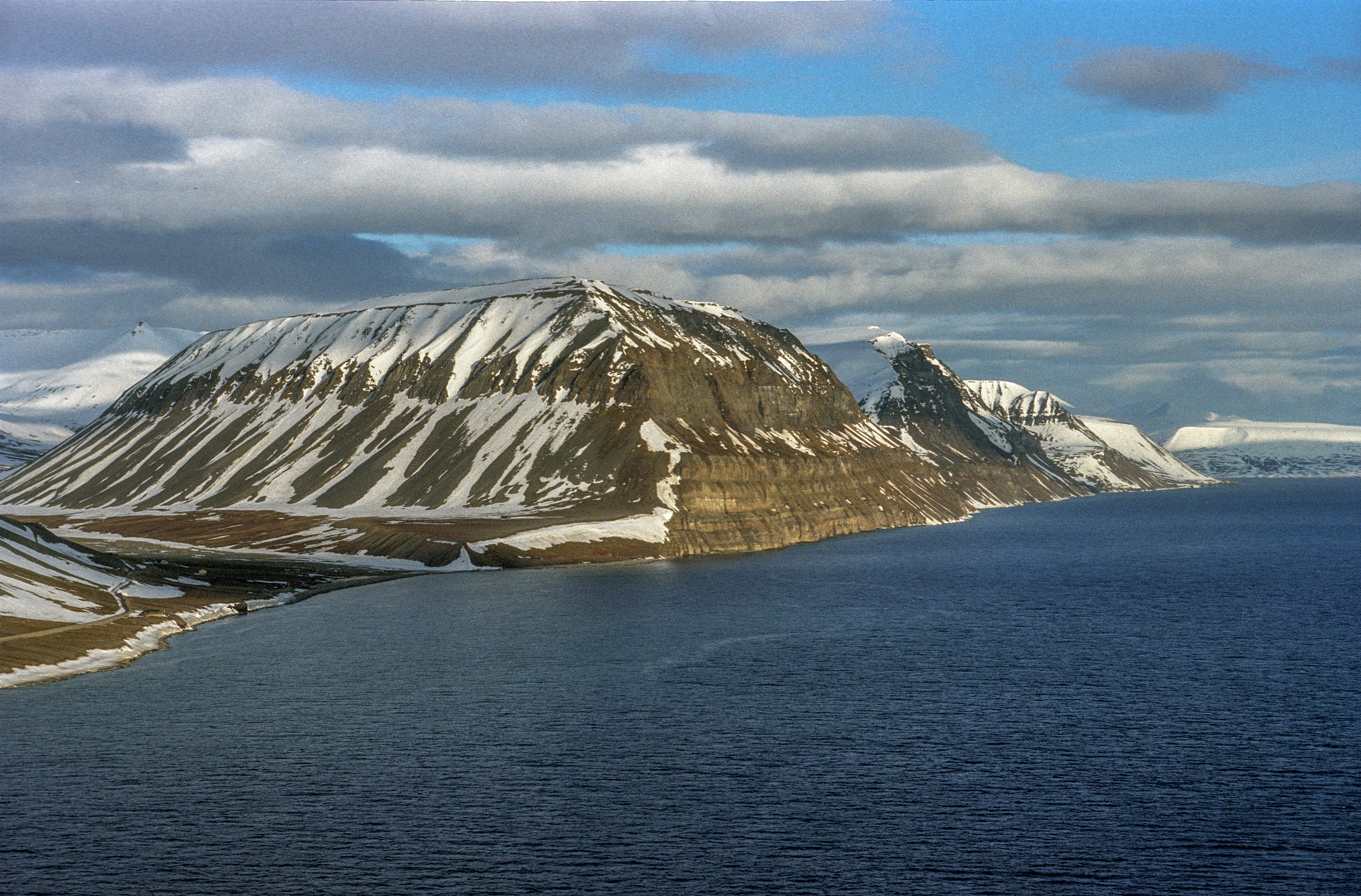
- Spitsbergen,

- Biogeographic regions of Europe, as defined by the European Environment Agency; Arctic

Ecology
- Realm: Palearctic

Geography
- Oceans or seas: Arctic Ocean

The European Arctic Biogeographic Region is the biogeographic region of Europe around and in the Arctic Ocean.

== Extent ==
The European Commission and the Council of Europe have defined the European Arctic biogeographical region for the purpose of reporting on conservation efforts and results. The region includes Iceland and parts of Norway and Russia, including Svalbard (Spitsbergen), Franz Josef Land and Novaya Zemlya. It has a land area of 670,000 square kilometres (260,000 sq mi), of which 63% is in Russia, 22% in Norway and 15% in Iceland. About 60% of the land is covered by grassland and tundra.

== Environment ==
The region has a wide variety of landscapes, and includes some of the last remaining large wilderness areas in Europe. Many of the land areas are coastal, strongly affected by exchange with the sea. Large areas are ice-covered, and many areas have permafrost, creating demanding conditions for plants and animals. Most species are dormant in winter, but large number of plants and animals are active in the warmer months. There are many species of migrating birds and fish, common to all the polar regions.

The environment is affected by air pollution from distant sources. Some areas have been affected by overgrazing, and are now being affected by tourism. Global warming will force species to move northward or to higher elevations, and may cause some extinctions.

== Sources ==
- Condé, Sophie; Richard, Dominique; Merzliakova, Irina; Ottósson, Jón Gunnar (19 December 2008), The Arctic biogeographical, European Environment Agency
