= Site of Community Importance =

Type of protected area of Europe

A Site of Community Importance (SCI) is defined in the European Commission Habitats Directive (92/43/EEC) as a site which, in the biogeographical region or regions to which it belongs, contributes significantly to the maintenance or restoration at a favourable conservation status of a natural habitat type or of a species and may also contribute significantly to the coherence of Natura 2000, and/or contributes significantly to the maintenance of biological diversity within the biogeographic region or regions concerned.

They are proposed to the Commission by the State Members and once approved, they can be designated as SACs by the State Member.

== Definition ==
In the environment field, the term is used to define an area:

- which contributes significantly to maintaining or restoring one of the 233 European natural habitat types defined in Annex I of the Habitats Directive or to maintaining in a favourable state of conservation one of the approximately 900 species defined in Annex II;
- which can contribute to the coherence of the Natura 2000 network of protected areas in the European Union;
- and/or which contributes significantly to maintaining the biodiversity of the region in which it is located.

=== Examples of the habitat types defined in Annex I ===
- Open sea and tidal areas
- Sea dunes of the Atlantic, North Sea and Baltic coasts
- Phrygana
- Natural grasslands
- Mediterranean sclerophyllous forests

=== Examples of the species defined in Annex II ===
- Eurasian lynx (Lynx lynx)
- Lilford's wall lizard (Podarcis lilfordi)
- Apteromantis aptera
- Centaurea alba
- Lemon-scented jasmine (Jasminum azoricum)

== See also ==
- Area of Outstanding Natural Beauty (AONB)
- Conservation designations
- Environmentally sensitive area (ESA)
- List of conservation topics
- Protected areas
- Site of Special Scientific Interest (SSSI)
- List of Sites of Community Importance by country
- Zone naturelle d'intérêt écologique, faunistique et floristique (English)
