= Continental Biogeographic Region =

Biogeographic region of Europe

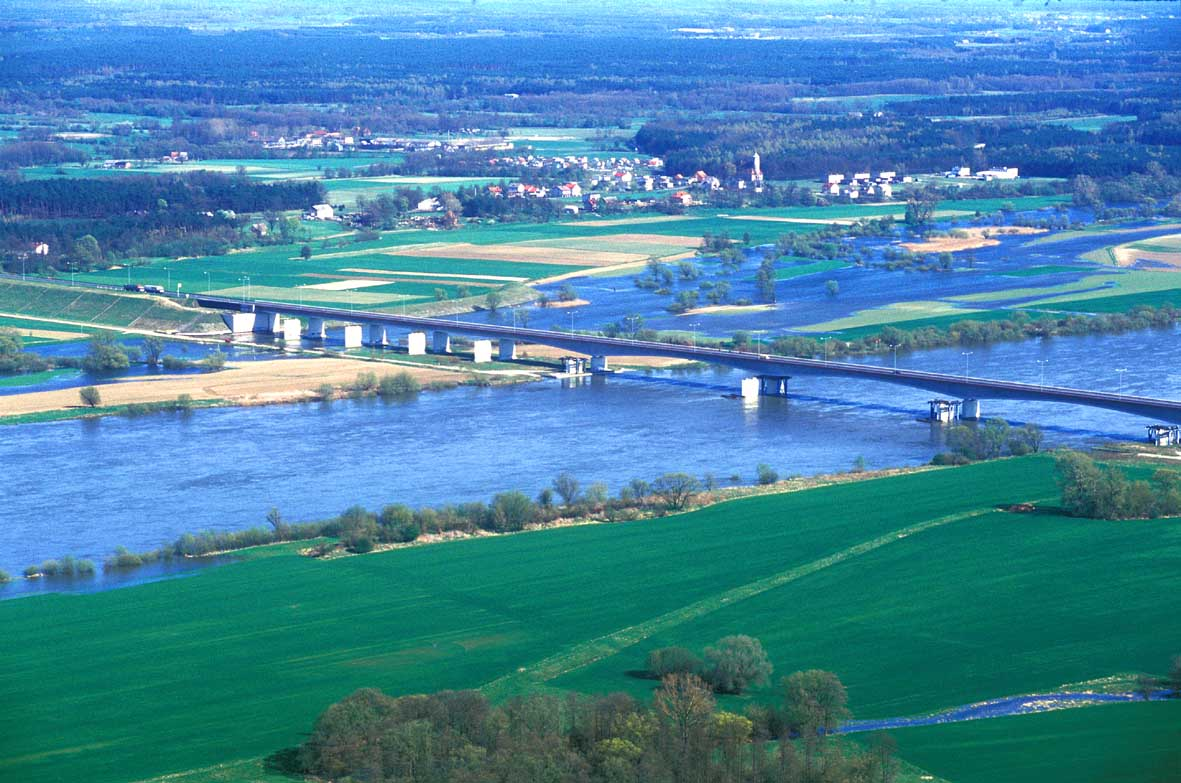
- Torun, Poland, bridge over Vistula 1996

- Biogeographic regions of Europe, as defined by the European Environment Agency; Continental

Ecology
- Realm: Palearctic

Geography
- Countries: Austria, Belgium, Belarus, Bosnia and Herzegovina, Bulgaria, Croatia, Czech Republic, Germany, Denmark, France, Italy, Lithuania, Luxembourg, Moldova, North Macedonia, Poland, Romania, Russia, Serbia, Slovenia, Sweden, Switzerland, Ukraine
- Oceans or seas: Adriatic, Baltic
- Rivers: Danube, Loire, Rhine, Po, Elbe, Oder, Vistula

The Continental Biogeographic Region is a biogeographic region of Europe that extends in a broad band from east to west through the center of the continent.

== Extent ==
The Continental Region extends from central France to the Ural Mountains. The southern part of this region is almost completely separated from the larger northern part by the Alps and Carpathians of the Alpine region and the plains of the Pannonian region. More than 25% of the European Union is in the Continental region. Luxembourg is completely within the region. Large parts of France, Germany, Italy, Poland, Czech Republic and Bulgaria are in the region, as are significant parts of Denmark, Belgium, Austria, Slovenia and Romania. Just 3% of Sweden is in the region.

== Environment ==
The climate is generally hot in summer and cold in winter, with less variation of temperature in the west, where the Atlantic has a moderating influence. The lands is generally flat in the north and hillier further south, apart from the wide floodplains of the Danube and Po rivers.

The region was covered by wetlands and deciduous beech forests after the glaciers of the last ice age retreated. The forests have mostly been cleared to make way for farming and the rivers have been canalized, greatly reducing wetland habitats. Pomerania in Poland and eastern Germany is still thinly populated and holds many lakes, fens and mires. The southern part of the Continental Region has much vegetation in common with the lower levels of the Alpine region, and with the Mediterranean region.

== Sources ==
- Sundseth, Kerstin (2009), Natura 2000 in the Continental Region (PDF), Belgium: European Commission Environment Directorate General, doi:10.2779/83178, ISBN 978-92-79-11727-5
