= Alpine Biogeographic Region =

Mountainous environment in Europe

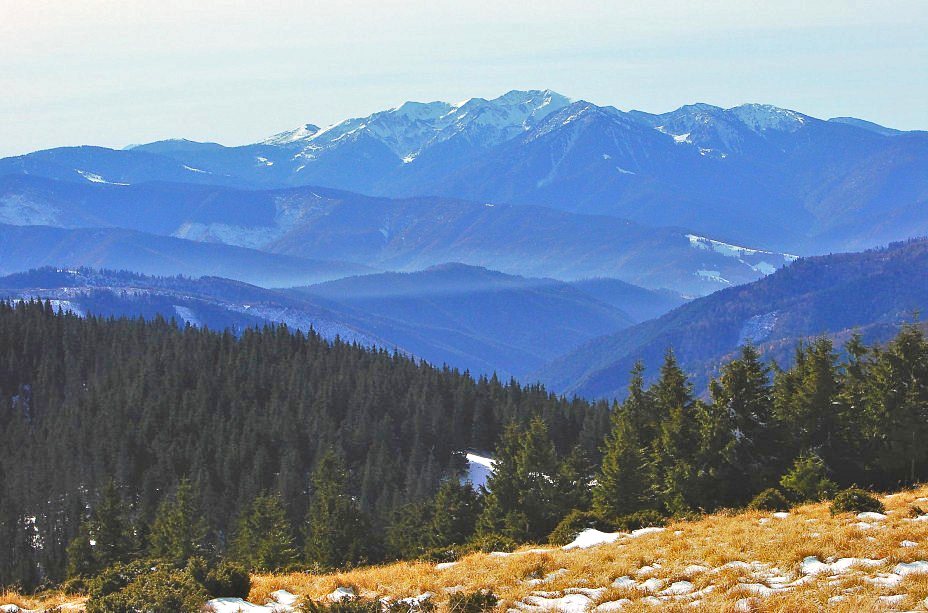
- Marmara mountain range, Ukrainian Carpathians

- Biogeographic regions of Europe, as defined by the European Environment Agency; Alpine

Ecology
- Realm: Palearctic

Geography
- Countries: List: Albania; Armenia; Austria; Bosnia and Herzegovina; Bulgaria; Croatia; Finland; France; Georgia; Germany; Greece; Italy; Kosovo; Monaco; Montenegro; North Macedonia; Norway; Poland; Romania; Serbia; Slovakia; Slovenia; Spain; Sweden; Switzerland; Ukraine
- Oceans or seas: Atlantic Ocean

The Alpine Biogeographic Region is a biogeographic region, as defined by the European Environment Agency, that covers the mountainous regions of Europe.

== Extent ==
The Alpine biogeographic region of Europe includes the Alps in France, Italy, Germany, Austria, Slovenia, Switzerland and Monaco, the Apennines in Italy, the Pyrenees between Spain and France, the Scandes in Sweden, Finland and Norway and the Carpathians in Slovakia, Poland, Romania and Ukraine. The region also includes the Dinaric Alps, Balkans, Rhodopes, Urals and Caucasia.

== Environment ==
All the ranges in the Alpine region have high altitude, rugged terrain and a relatively cold and harsh climate. The mountains all have the same zones of vegetation, but further north the low temperature zones are found lower down. On the lower slopes there are forests and grasslands. Higher up the montane grasslands give way to scrub heath and then to a few very hardy plants adapted to the rocks and snow of the highest altitudes. The complex topography creates many different microclimates. The Alpine region has about two thirds of the plants found in Europe, including endemic plants at the higher levels with very limited distribution.

== Sources ==
- Europe's environment: the third assessment. Environmental assessment report No 10., Luxembourg: European Environment Agency, 2003, ISBN 92-9167-574-1
- Sundseth, K (2006), Natura 2000 in the Alpine Region (PDF), Luxembourg: European Commission Environment Directorate General, ISBN 92-894-9984-2
