= Anatolian Biogeographic Region =

Biogeographic region of Turkey

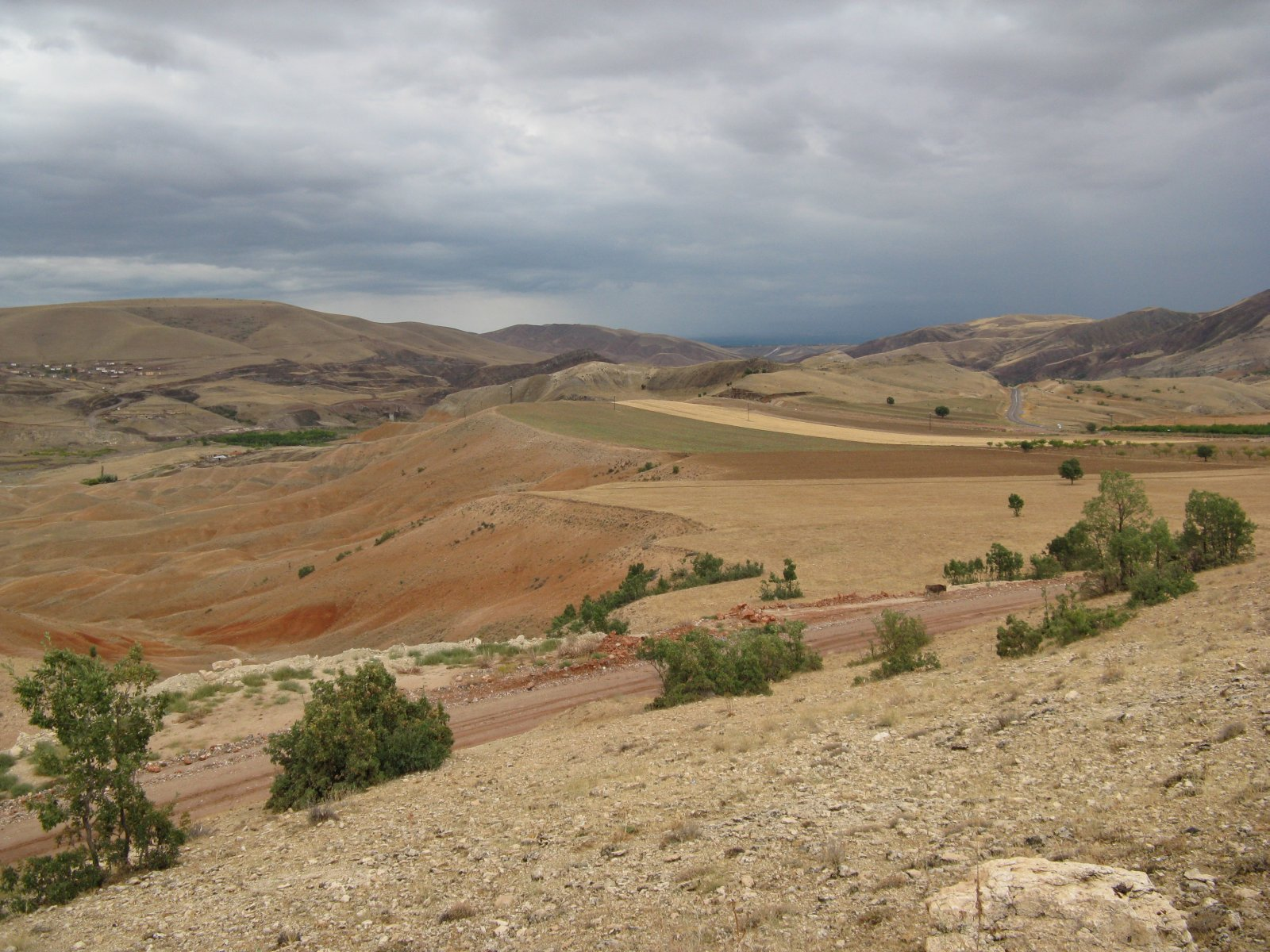
- Anatolian Plateau near Malatya

- Biogeographic regions of Europe, as defined by the European Environment Agency; Anatolian

Ecology
- Realm: Palearctic

Geography
- Country: Turkey
- Rivers: Euphrates, Tigris, Kizilirmak, Sakarya

The Anatolian Biogeographic Region is a biogeographic region of Turkey, as defined by the European Environment Agency .

== Extent ==
The Anatolian Biogeographic Region covers the interior and east of Anatolia, and excludes the coastal areas along the Black Sea and Mediterranean. It includes the central Anatolian Plateau, the Pontic and Taurus mountains and northern Mesopotamia. It is an area of recently folded mountains formed from sedimentary rocks from the Paleozoic to Quaternary (539 million years ago to the present).

There are many intrusions and broad areas of recent volcanic material including Mount Ararat at 5,137 metres (16,854 ft), but no volcanic activity at present. The area is geologically unstable and very prone to earthquakes. It averages about 900 metres (3,000 ft) above sea level, with rugged terrain surrounding areas of gently sloping or flat land. The main rivers are the Euphrates, Tigris, Kizilirmak and Sakarya.

== Environment ==
Most of the area receives low levels of precipitation. There are large differences in temperature between summer and winter. The region provides a biogeographical transition between Europe and Asia, and is home to several mammals originating in North Africa or Asia. There are many endemic species of flora adapted to xerophytic and salt steppe conditions. Threats to biodiversity include agriculture, over-grazing, exotic species, dams and drainage projects.

== Sources ==
- Condé, Sophie; Richard, Dominique (19 December 2008), The Anatolian region (PDF), European Environment Agency
