= Mediterranean Biogeographic Region =

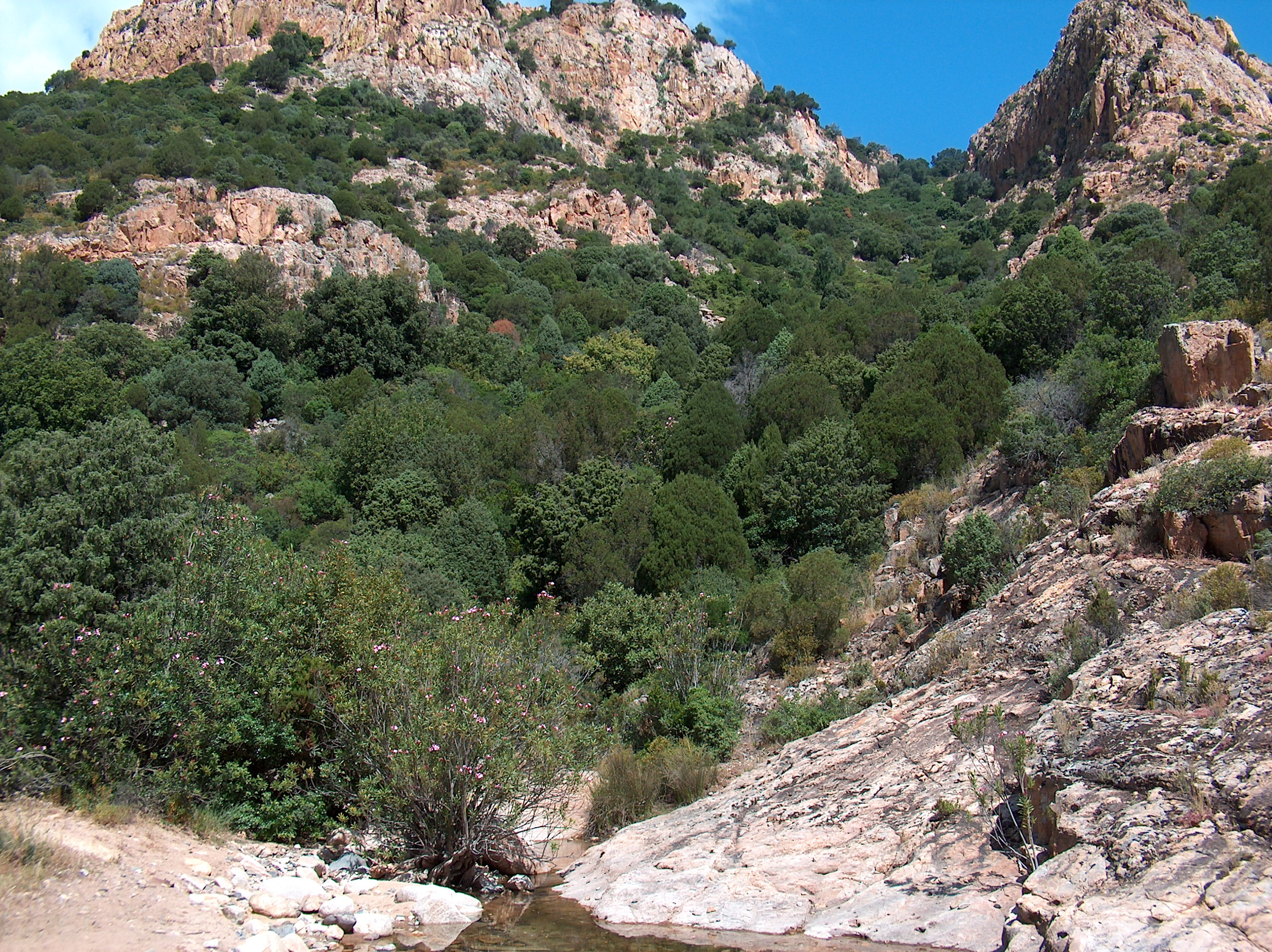
- Hillside Riparian forest and mediterranean shrubland vegetation on Monte Arcosu, Sardinia

- Biogeographic regions of Europe, as defined by the European Environment Agency; Mediterranean

Ecology
- Realm: Palearctic

Geography
- Oceans or seas: Mediterranean Sea
- Climate type: Csa / Csb

The Mediterranean Biogeographic Region is the biogeographic region around and including the Mediterranean Sea. The term is defined by the European Environment Agency as applying to the land areas of Europe that border on the Mediterranean Sea, and the corresponding territorial waters. The region is rich in biodiversity and has many endemic species. The term may also be used in the broader sense of all the lands of the Mediterranean Basin, or in the narrow sense of just the Mediterranean Sea.

== Extent ==
The European Commission defines the Mediterranean Biogeographic Region as consisting of the Mediterranean Sea, Greece, Malta, Cyprus, large parts of Portugal, Spain and Italy, and a smaller part of France. The region includes 20.6% of European Union territory.

== Climate ==
The region has cool humid winters and hot dry summers. Wladimir Köppen divided his "Cs" mediterranean climate classification into "Csa" with a highest mean monthly temperature over 22 °C (72 °F) and "Csb" where the mean monthly temperature was always lower than 22 °C (72 °F). The region may also be subdivided into dry zones such as Alicante in Spain, and humid zones such as Cinque Terre in Italy.

== Terrain ==
The region has generally hilly terrain and includes islands, high mountains, semi-arid steppes and thick Mediterranean forests, woodlands, and scrub with many aromatic plants. There are rocky shorelines and sandy beaches. The region has been greatly affected by human activity such as livestock grazing, cultivation, forest clearance and forest fires. In recent years tourism has put greater pressure on the shoreline environment.

== Biodiversity ==
The Mediterranean Biogeographic Region is rich in biodiversity and has many endemic species. The region has more plants species than all the other biogeographical regions of Europe combined. The wildlife and vegetation are adapted to the unpredictable weather, with sudden downpours or strong winds. Coastal wetlands are home to endemic species of insects, amphibians and fish, which provide food for large flocks of waders and dabbling ducks. The sea is also rich in marine life, including many endemic species. The shallow coastal waters hold huge Posidonia beds, underwater meadows that harbor rare crustaceans, sponges and Ascidiacea (sea squirts). As of 2009 the region was not sufficiently covered in the EuMon database. Recruiting volunteers to monitor species may help address the issue.

The Iberian Peninsula is particularly rich in species, including rare and endemic species, due to its complex climate and terrain, and because it provided refugia during the glacial period of the Pleistocene. A 2011 study of spiders in the coastal dunes of Portugal showed that the primary factor in beta diversity was a broad-scale gradient of mediterraneity. Diversity was lower in the northern dunes, which are in the Eurosiberian biogeographic region, and higher in the center and south in the Mediterranean biogeographic region (Note: The Eurosiberian and Mediterranean regions of the north of the peninsula are roughly separated by the divide between the Cantabrian and Mediterranean water basins, although there are patches of Mediterranean vegetation on the Atlantic side, and of Eurosiberian vegetation on the Mediterranean side.)

== Related concepts ==
=== Mediterranean Basin ===
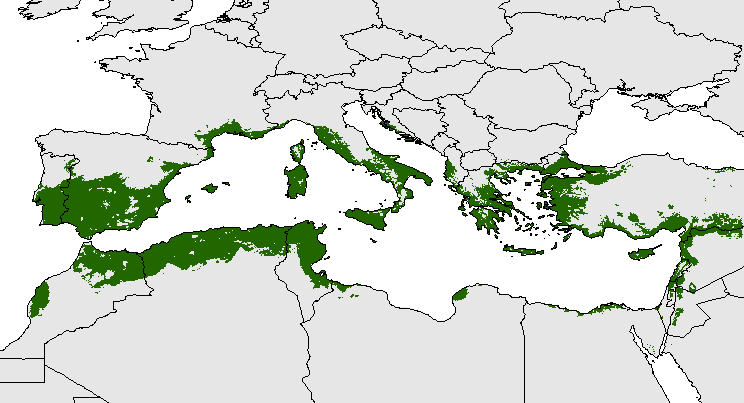
Potential distribution of olives, strongly correlated with the Mediterranean basin biogeographic region

Arco Aguilar and Rodríguez Delgado state that three large floristic regions originated in the Mesogean region after the Pleistocene glaciation, the Mediterranean, Saharo-North-Arabian and Iranian-Turanian. (Note: Various plants in the Canary Islands came from the Mediterranean region via the Northwest African corridor, while others came from the Saharo-North-Arabian or were introduced by man.) Academics such as Ana Isabel Queiroz and Simon Pooley consider that the Mediterranean biogeographic region includes all of the Mediterranean Sea and all the lands surrounding it that have a Mediterranean-type climate (MTC).

The Mediterranean Basin is about 3,800 kilometres (2,400 mi) long, from Lebanon in the east to Portugal in the west, and about 1,000 kilometres (620 mi) wide, from Morocco and Libya in the south to Italy in the north. The region contains about 1.6% of the world's dry land but has about 10% of the known vascular plant species, with over 25,000 identified to date. More than half of them are endemic.

The biogeographic origins of the non-indigenous plants of the region include northern and central Eurasia, southwest and central Asia, North Africa, Arabia and the tropics of Africa. For example, the Mediterranean species of the Androcymbium genus migrated northward from tropical Africa via the Eastern African mountain ranges to reach the Mediterranean in the Middle Miocene, at a time when the climate was quite different from today. Molecular phylogeography is starting to give new insights into the origins and evolution of Mediterranean species.

=== Mediterranean Sea ===
An analysis of literature has found about 17,000 marine species recorded as occurring in the Mediterranean Sea. This estimate is probably low, with microbes significantly under-reported, and with large gaps in knowledge of the deep sea areas and the southern and eastern part of the sea. Biodiversity is generally greater in the coastal and shallow regions, lower in deeper areas. The ecology is threatened by habitat loss or degradation from fishing, pollution, climate change, eutrophication and alien species.

== Sources ==
- Arco Aguilar, Marcelino J.; Rodríguez Delgado, Octavio (1 January 2018), Vegetation of the Canary Islands, Springer, ISBN 978-3-319-77255-4
- Arroyo, Mary T. Kalin; Zedler, Paul H.; Fox, Marlyn D. (6 December 2012), Ecology and Biogeography of Mediterranean Ecosystems in Chile, California, and Australia, Springer Science & Business Media, ISBN 978-1-4612-2490-7
- Carvalho, José C.; Cardoso, Pedro; Crespo, Luís C.; Henriques, Sérgio; Carvalho, Rui; Gomes, Pedro (March 2011), "Determinants of beta diversity of spiders in coastal dunes along a gradient of mediterraneity", Diversity and Distributions, 17 (2), Wiley: 225–234, doi:10.1111/j.1472-4642.2010.00731.x, JSTOR 41058172
- Cristina Penalba, M. (December 1994), "The History of the Holocene Vegetation in Northern Spain from Pollen Analysis", Journal of Ecology, 82 (4), British Ecological Society: 815–832, doi:10.2307/2261446, JSTOR 2261446
- Coll, Marta; Piroddi, Chiara; Steenbeek, Jeroen; Kaschner, Kristin; Lasram, Frida; et al. (2010), "The Biodiversity of the Mediterranean Sea: Estimates, Patterns, and Threats", PLOS ONE, 5 (8) e11842, Bibcode:2010PLoSO...511842C, doi:10.1371/journal.pone.0011842, PMC 2914016
- Hans Peter Comes (October 2004), "The Mediterranean Region: A Hotspot for Plant Biogeographic Research", The New Phytologist, 164 (1), Wiley on behalf of the New Phytologist Trust: 11–14, doi:10.1111/j.1469-8137.2004.01194.x, JSTOR 1514398
- Imeson, Anton (24 January 2012), Desertification, Land Degradation and Sustainability, John Wiley & Sons, ISBN 978-1-119-97848-0
- Kerstin Sundseth (2009), Natura 2000 in the Mediterranean Region (PDF), European Commission Environment Directorate General, doi:10.2779/77695, ISBN 978-92-79-11587-5
- Queiroz, Ana Isabel; Pooley, Simon (15 May 2018), Histories of Bioinvasions in the Mediterranean, Springer, ISBN 978-3-319-74986-0
- Schmeller, Dirk S.; Henry, Pierre-Yves; Julliard, Romain; Gruber, Bernd; Clobert, Jean; et al. (April 2009), "Advantages of Volunteer-Based Biodiversity Monitoring in Europe", Conservation Biology, 23 (2), Wiley for Society for Conservation Biology: 307–316, doi:10.1111/j.1523-1739.2008.01125.x, JSTOR 29738730, PMID 19183201
- "The Mediterranean Region", ec.europa.eu/environment, European Commission's DG Environment
